= George Clyde Hale =

American explosives researcher

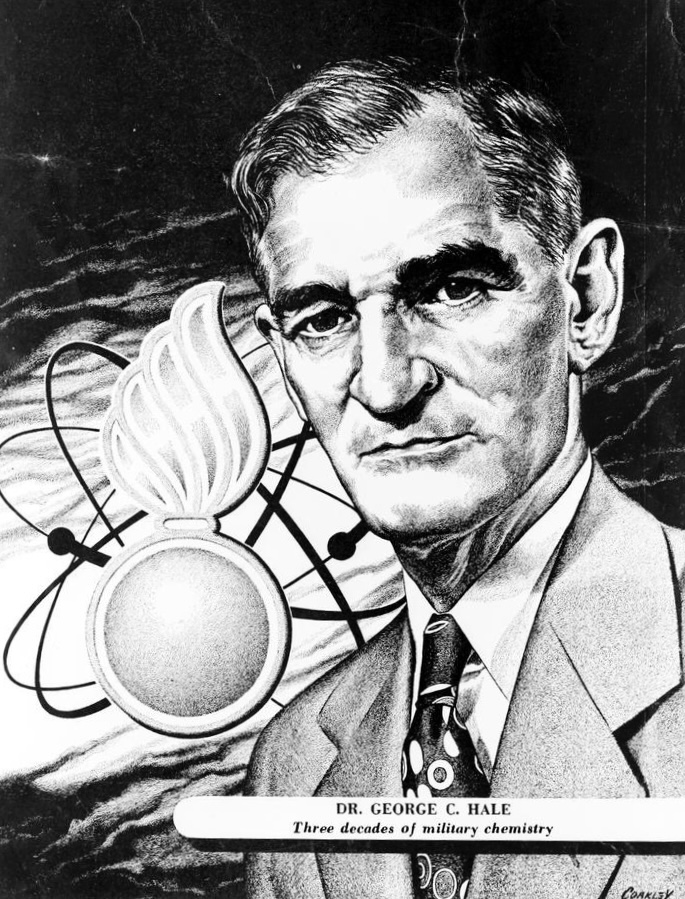

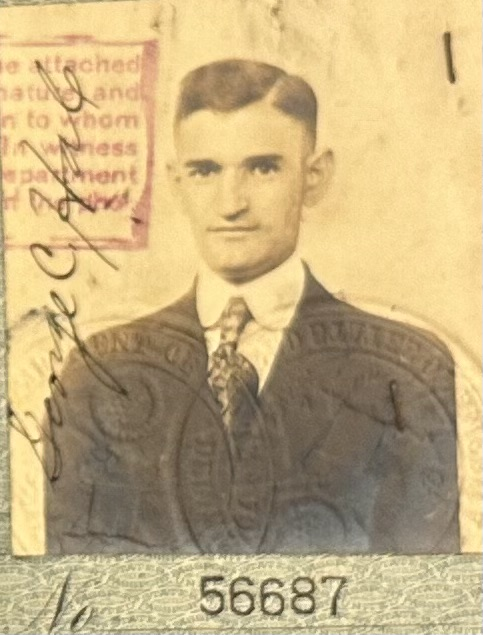
George C. Hale passport photo and signature

George Clyde Hale (September 29, 1881 – November 3, 1948) received a patent in 1935 for the explosive ethylenedinitramine (EDNA) which was named Haleite in his honor. George Clyde Hale was issued 29 patents related to explosives, propellant powders, fuse powders, priming compositions, and pyrotechnics during his career at Picatinny Arsenal. The Hale Building at the Picatinny Arsenal is a research facility that honors his contributions to military exposives.

== Biography ==
=== Early life ===
Hale was born in Cass, Sullivan County, Indiana. His parents were Charles Hale (b. July 16, 1862), a coal miner who also ran a grocery store, and Rosette Bledsoe Hale. Hale graduated from Sullivan High School in 1910 and taught school for a year before enrolling in college. He was married to Mary Allen Raines Hale and had 2 sons, George Hale Jr and Allen C. Hale, Ph.D.

=== Indiana University ===
Hale was admitted to Indiana University in Bloomington in 1911 and by 1915 had achieved both and AB and AM in chemistry. After graduation with his master's degree he was appointed as an instructor of chemistry. In 1917 he was granted a leave of absence to join the war effort at the Picatinny Arsenal. He would eventually receive his Ph.D. in chemistry in 1925 with his thesis titled, "Nitration of Hexamethylenetetramine" which was also published in the Journal of the American Chemical Society. This thesis outlines the production of the brisant explosive cyclotrimethylene trinitramine which was also known as hexagon, cylconite and RDX. His Ph.D. was only the 6th one conferred by the Chemistry Department at Indiana University.

=== Death and legacy ===
Dr. Hale suffered an acute coronary syndrome in 1946 and never fully recovered. He died 2 years later and is buried in the Duggar Cemetery in Duggar, Indiana.

The George C. Hale Building at Picatinny was dedicated April 27, 1962. A bronze plaque on the structure bears the inscription: "George C. Hale 1881-1948 The efforts which are undertaken here perpetuate the ideals and aspirations which Dr. George C. Hale devoted his life." The building is a memorial to his leadership and his contributions to the field of explosive research.

== Picatinny Arsenal ==
When the United States formally entered World War I on April 6, 1917, Hale began work as a research chemist at Picatinny Arsenal. The primary explosive used by the US during that war was trinitrotoluene (TNT). About 2,500,00 tons of high explosives containing TNT and its derivatives were used by the contending powers during the war resulting in an estimated 10 million casualties.

After the war in July 1920 he was sent to Germany to assist in collecting information on German expolsives and ammunition under the command of Major R.L. Maxwell at the Mulheim Ordnance Depot. It was there that he studied all types of German ammunitions including the metals, materials and processes that they used in their production.

In 1929 Hale was promoted to Chief of the Chemical Department at Picatinny, a position he held until his death. During his tenure he developed standardized research into the production of military explosives. Portions of his work have been presented to the patent literature, other work of his has been kept secret due to the necessary restrictions imposed by military secrecy.

Between World War I and World War II, the chemists at the Picatinny Arsenal had been trying to find a substitute for RDX that would retain is brisance but eliminate its sensitivity to friction or shock which hampered its production and storage. Through their efforts they invented ethylenedinitramine (EDNA) which was the first American explosive. This substance could replace picric acid and TNT as a high explosive, tetryl as a detonator, and nitroglycerine or nitrocellulose as a propellant because of its insensitivity to shock and ease of ignition. Developed in 1935, it was not used during World War II until the problem of the high cost of producing one of its intermediaries, ethylene urea, could be solved by the DuPont Company.

Leading up to and during World War II, Hale assisted with the production of RDX in the US at plants at the Wabash Ordnance Plant near Newport, Indiana using the British discovered Woolwich method and the Houston Ordnance Plant in Eastern Tennessee using the Bachmann process discovered by Werner E. Bachmann at the University of Michigan.
