= TNP-ATP =

Fluorescent molecule

TNP-ATP is a fluorescent molecule that is able to determine whether a protein binds to ATP, and the constants associated with that binding. It is primarily used in fluorescence spectroscopy, but is also very useful as an acceptor molecule in FRET, and as a fluorescent probe in fluorescence microscopy and X-ray crystallography.

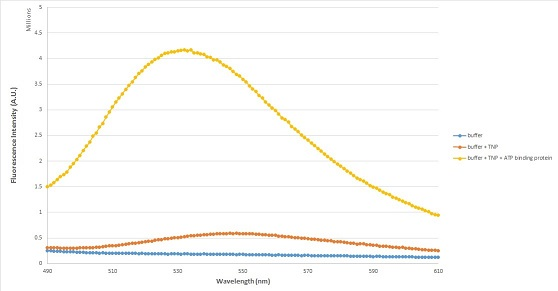
TNP BINDING

== Constituent parts ==
TNP refers to the chemical compound 2,4,6-trinitrophenol, also known as Picric acid. It is a primary constituent of many unexploded landmines, and is a cousin to TNT, but less stable. It is recognized as an environmental contaminant and is toxic to many organisms. It is still commonly used in the manufacturing of fireworks, explosives, and rocket fuels, as well as in leather, pharmaceutical, and dye industries.

ATP is an essential mediator of life. It is used to overcome unfavorable energy barriers to initiate and fuel chemical reactions. It is also used to drive biological machinery and regulate a number of processes via protein-phosphorylation. However, the proteins that bind ATP for both regulation and enzymatic reactions are very diverse—many yet undiscovered—and for many proteins their relationship to ATP in terms of number of binding sites, binding constants, and dissociation constants remain unclear.

== TNP-ATP ==
Conjugating TNP to ATP renders this nucleotide triphosphate fluorescent and colored whilst allowing it to retain its biological activity. TNP-ATP is thus a fluorescent analog of ATP. This conjugation is very useful in providing information about interactions between ATP and an ATP-binding protein because TNP-ATP interacts with proteins and enzymes as a substitute for its parent nucleotide, and has a strong binding affinity for most systems that require ATP.

TNP is excited at a wavelength of 408 and 470 nm, and fluoresces in the 530–560 nm range. This is a very useful range of excitation because it is far from where proteins or nucleotides absorb. When TNP-ATP is in water or other aqueous solutions, this emission is very weak. However, once TNP-ATP binds to a protein, there is a dramatic increase in fluorescent intensity. This property enables researchers to study various proteins’ binding interaction with ATP. Thus, with enhanced fluorescence, it can be seen whether a protein binds to ATP.

When TNP-ATP in water is excited at 410 nm, TNP-ATP shows a single fluorescence maximum at 561 nm. This maximum shifts as the fluid's viscosity changes. For example, in N,N-dimethylformamide, instead of having its maxima at 561 nm as in water, the maxima is instead at 533 nm.

Binding to a protein will also change the wavelength of maximal emission, as well as a change in fluorescent intensity. For example, binding to the chemotaxis protein CheA indicates a severalfold enhancement of fluorescence intensity and a blue-shift in wavelength of the maximal emission.

Using this TNP nucleotide analog has been shown in many instances to be superior to traditional radionucleotide-labelling based techniques. The health concerns and the cost associated with the use of radioactive isotopes makes TNP-ATP an attractive alternative.

The first fluorescent ribose-modified ATP is 2’,3’-O-(2,4,7-trinitrocyclohexadienylidene) adenosine 5’triphosphate (TNP-ATP), and was introduced in 1973 by Hiratsuka and Uchida. TNP-ATP was originally synthesized to investigate the ATP binding site of myosin ATPase. Reports of TNP-ATP's success in the investigation of this motor protein extended TNP-ATP's use to other proteins and enzymes. TNP-ATP has now been used as a spectroscopic probe for numerous proteins suspected to have ATP interactions. These include several protein kinases, ATPases, myosin, and other nucleotide binding proteins. Over the past twenty years, there have been hundreds of papers describing TNP-ATP's use and applications. Many applications involving this fluorescently labeled nucleotide have helped to clarify structure-function relationships of many ATP-requiring proteins and enzymes. There have also been a growing number of papers that display TNP-ATP use as a means of assessing the ATP-binding capacity of various mutant proteins.

== Preparation ==
Preparing TNP-ATP is a one-step synthesis that is relatively safe and easy. Adenosine's ribose moiety can be trinitrophenylated by 2,4,6-trinitrobenzene-1-sulfonate (TNBS). The resulting compound assumes a bright orange color and has visible absorption characteristics, as is characteristic of a Meiseinheimer spiro complex compound linking.

To see the exact method of preparion, please refer to T. Hiratsuka's and K. Uchida's paper "Preparation and Properties of 2'(r 3')-O(2,4,6-trinitrophenyl) Adenosine 5'-triphosphate, an Analog of Adenosine Triphosphate," found in the reference section.

To revert TNP-ATP back to its constituent parts, or in other words to hydrolyze TNP-ATP to give equilmolar amounts of picric acid (TNP) and ATP, TNP-ATP should be treated with 1 M HCl at 100 degrees Celsius for 1.5 hours. This is because if TNP-ATP is acidified under mild conditions, it results in the opening of the dioxolane ring attached to the 2’-oxygen, leaving a 3’O-TNP derivative as the only product.

== Storage ==
TNP-ATP should be stored at −20 °C, in the dark, and used under minimal lighting conditions. When in solution, TNP-ATP has a shelf life of about 30 days.

== pKa and isosbestic point ==
When absorption was measured against wavelength at various pH values, the changes at wavelength 408 nm and 470 nm yielded a sigmoidal line with a midpoint at 5.1. This indicated that the absorbance at these two wavelengths depends upon the ionization of the chromophoric portion of TNP-ATP and is unaffected by ionization of ATP. Although this ionization constant of 5.1 is not in physiological range, it has been shown that the absorbance of TNP-ATP is sensitive enough to detect changes due to slight shifts in neutral pH. Spectroscopic superposition indicated TNP-ATP's isosbestic point to be 339 nm.

== Constants and calculations ==
At low concentrations of TNP-ATP (≤1 μM), fluorescent intensity is proportional to the concentration of TNP added. However, at concentrations exceeding 1 μM, inner filter effects cause this relationship to no longer be linear. To correct this, researchers must determine the ratio of the predicted theoretical fluorescence intensity (assuming linearity) to the observed fluorescence intensity and then apply this correction factor. However, in most cases, researchers will try to keep the concentration of TNP to lower than 1 μM.

To determine binding affinities, TNP-ATP is added to a solution and then titrated with protein. This produces a saturation curve from which the binding affinity can be determined. The number of binding sites may also be determined through this saturation curve by looking to see if there are sudden changes in slope. One can also titrate a fixed amount of protein with increasing additions of TNP-ATP to obtain a saturation curve. To do so, however, may get complicated due to the inner filter effects that will need to be corrected for.

To determine dissociation constants, TNP-ATP can be competed off of a protein with ATP. The value of the dissociation constant K_{d} for a single-site binding can then be obtained by applying the Langmuir equation for a curve fit:

$\mathrm{RFU_{obs}} = \mathrm{RFU_{free}} + \frac{(\mathrm{RFU_{bound}} - \mathrm{RFU_{free}}) \times \left( (\mathrm{[protein]_{total}} + \mathrm{[TNP]_{total}} + \mathrm{K_d}) - \sqrt{(\mathrm{[protein]_{total}} + \mathrm{[TNP]_{total}} + \mathrm{K_d})^2 - (4 \times \mathrm{[protein]_{total}} \times \mathrm{[TNP]})} \right)}{2 \mathrm{[TNP]_{total}}}$

where RFU is relative fluorescent units, RFU_{obs} is the fluorescence observed, RFU_{free} is the fluorescence of free TNP-ATP, and RFU_{bound} is the fluorescence of TNP-ATP when completely bound to a protein.

To measure an ATP competitor, one can add competitor to pre-incubated samples of protein:TNP-ATP. The fraction of TNP-ATP bound to the protein can be calculated via:

$\theta = \frac{\mathrm{RFU_{obs}} - \mathrm{RFU_{free}}}{\mathrm{RFU_{max}} - \mathrm{RFU_{free}}}$

where θ is that fraction, and RFU_{max} is the value of fluorescence intensity at saturation, meaning when 100% of TNP-ATP is bound.

The dissociation constants for TNP and competitor can then be calculated through the equation:

$\theta = \frac{1}{2} \mathrm{[TNP]} \times \left( \mathrm{K_{TNP}} + \frac{\mathrm{K_{TNP}}}{\mathrm{K_{competitor}}} \times \mathrm{[competitor]} + \mathrm{[TNP]} + \mathrm{[protein]} - \sqrt{\left( \mathrm{K_{TNP}} + \frac{\mathrm{K_{TNP}}}{\mathrm{K_{competitor}}} \times \mathrm{[competitor]} + \mathrm{[TNP]} + \mathrm{[protein]}\right)^2 - 4 \times \mathrm{[TNP]} \times \mathrm{[protein]}} \right)$

For reasons not yet fully understood, TNP-ATP typically binds the ATP binding sites of proteins and enzymes anywhere from one to three times tighter than regular ATP. The dissociation constants are usually around 0.3–50 μM.

== Other uses ==
In addition to using TNP-ATP to determine whether a protein binds ATP, its binding affinity and dissociation constants, and number of binding sites, TNP-ATP can also be used in ligand binding studies. To do this, titrations of the protein are added to TNP-ATP. Then, ligand is added to displace the bound analog. This is measured by decreases in fluorescence. One can also do this by titrating protein with TNP-ATP in the presence and absence of varying concentrations of the ligand of interest. Using either experiment will allow the binding affinity of the ligand to protein to be measured.

TNP-ATP is also valuable fluorescence acceptor. This is because, as with any good acceptor, TNP-ATP absorbs over a wide wavelength range that corresponds to the range of emission of common FRET donors. Thus, TNP-ATP can be used to look at the conformational changes that proteins undergo. For example, Na+/K+ ATPase, the distance between the active site and Cys457 was shown to change from 25 Angstroms to 28 Angstroms in changing from the Na+ conformation to the K+ conformation.

In addition to fluorescent spectroscopy, TNP-ATP is very useful in fluorescent microscopy. This is because it greatly increases the sensitivity of the observations when bound to proteins—the enhanced fluorescence greatly reduces the problem of background fluorescence. This is especially true under epifluorescent illumation (illumination and light are both on the same side of the specimen).

TNP-ATP has also been used in X-ray crystallography because it can be used to determine binding constants of crystallized substrates. This technique also demonstrates the structure of proteins in the presence or absence of TNP-ATP, which may or may not correspond to the structure of proteins when they bind ATP.
