= Little Cornwall =

Area of Loughton, Essex, England

Little Cornwall is the name given to part of Loughton, Essex, England. It is the hilly part of north-west Loughton closest to Epping Forest and characterised by steep hills, weatherboarded houses, narrow lanes and high holly hedges. There are many architecturally significant properties in this part of Loughton, including 18th-century and Arts & Crafts houses as well as Victorian homes ranging from small terraced cottages to large mansions.

Little Cornwall is roughly defined by the three conservation areas which it encompasses; Staples Road, York Hill, and Baldwins Hill, as well as parts of nearby Epping Forest. Electorally, it is mostly part of Loughton St John’s ward, though the houses in the Staples Rd Conservation area fall into St Mary's Ward.

The name Little Cornwall was given by author Ruth Rendell, Baroness Rendell of Babergh (1930-2015) who was educated at Loughton County High School for Girls and subsequently worked as a journalist in Loughton at the West Essex Gazette. Some of her fiction is set in Epping Forest and Loughton, and the name Little Cornwall, occurs in ‘The Face of Trespass’, first published in 1974. Part of the last novel she published during her lifetime, The Girl Next Door, is also set in Little Cornwall (and on Spareleaze-Tycehurst Hills nearby).

The area is also known as Loughton Hills, or ‘The Hills’, and occasionally as Little Devon. There are fine views from many points, notably across Epping Forest from Baldwins Hill, and across south-west Essex and north-east Greater London from the top of York Hill. The local residents group, 'The Hills Amenity Society' acts in a voluntary capacity to ensure the conservation area is maintained and enhanced, and residents' interests are looked after.

There is a private (disused) Unitarian burial ground in the back garden of a house in York Hill. York Hill is also the site of medieval pottery kilns; Potters Close was named to reflect that fact.

== Notable people ==
Famous people associated with the Little Cornwall area of Loughton include:

- Dick Turpin (1705-1739), who had a robber’s lair in the forest nearby and who traded in stolen venison, known locally as ‘black mutton’ (a row of houses in York Hill is known as Black Mutton Row);
- Mary Anne Clarke (1776-1852), actress and mistress of Frederick, Duke of York;
- Thomas Southwood Smith (1788-1861), medical pioneer and Unitarian minister, lived in Woodbury Hill;
- William Bridges Adams (1797-1872), railway pioneer who invented the railway fishplate and credited with the original idea for the Crystal Palace;
- 'Old' Tom Willingale (1798-1870), defender of Epping Forest and loppers' rights, lived in Baldwyns Cottages (now demolished, Wroths Path built on the site);
- Sarah Flower Adams (1805-1848), wife of W B Adams, poet and hymn writer who wrote ‘Nearer My God to Thee’;
- Robert Hunter (1823-1897), lexicographer and philanthropist;
- Millican Dalton (1867-1947), nicknamed the ‘Professor of Adventure’, pioneering outdoor enthusiast, mountaineer and founder of the Camping Club;
- Oswald Silberrad (1878-1960), the research chemist. Barnes Wallis worked at his laboratory at Dryads' Hall;
- Una Lucy Silberrad, novelist (sister of Oswald Silberrad), lived at Buckhurst Hill, but also had a cottage on School Green, Staples Road;
- Fred Stoker (1878-1943), horticulturalist of international repute, lived at 'The Summit', Baldwins Hill
- Sir Jacob Epstein (1880-1959), sculptor and painter, lived in Baldwins Hill and created many of his most famous works there;
- Doris (1886-1965) and Muriel Lester (1882-1968), philanthropists and pacifist sisters who founded Kingsley Hall community centre in London’s East End;
- Ken Campbell (1941-2008), writer, actor and theatre director, lived in Baldwins Hill in a Victorian wooden chalet locally known as the 'Swiss Cottage';
- Geoffrey Campbell (1969-2001), business consultant, born at No. 35 Wroths Path, died in the September 11, 2001 attacks; he was attending a meeting at the World Trade Center.
- Ruth Rendell (1930-2015), who lived on the edge of the area she often described as Little Cornwall, in Millsmead Way, where there is a blue plaque to her.
