= Nitrogen triiodide =

- Nitrogen triiodide (structural formula)

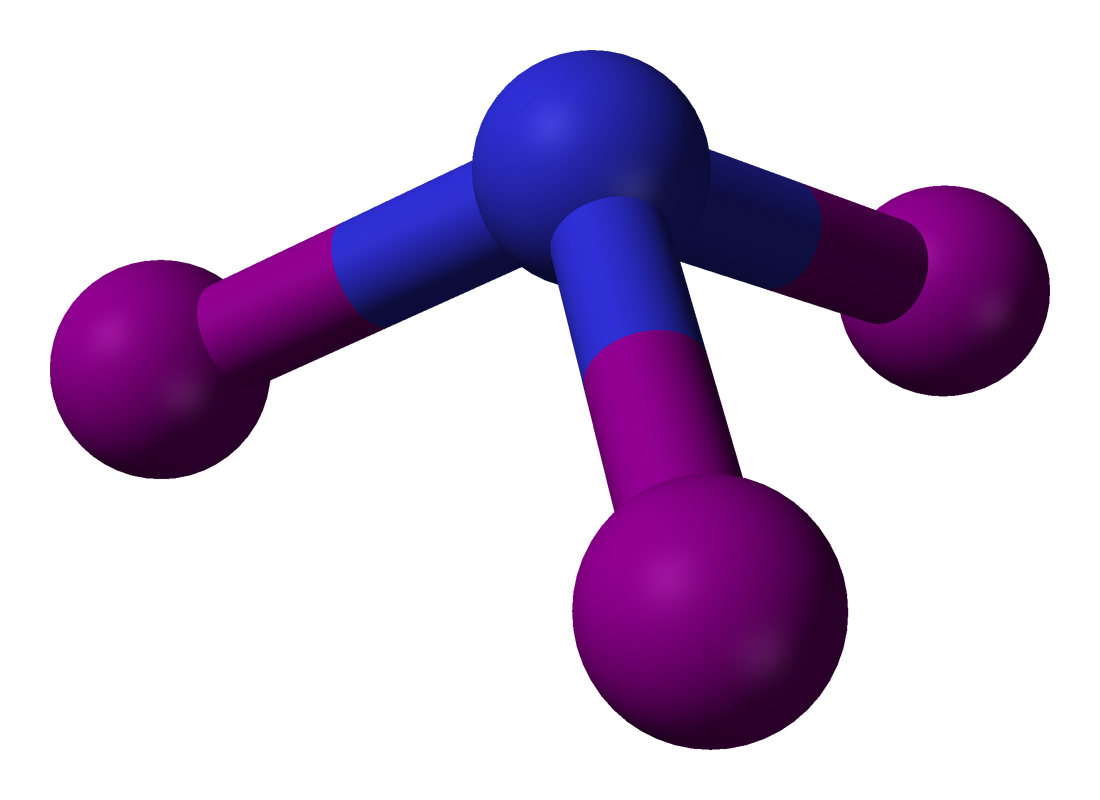
Nitrogen triiodide
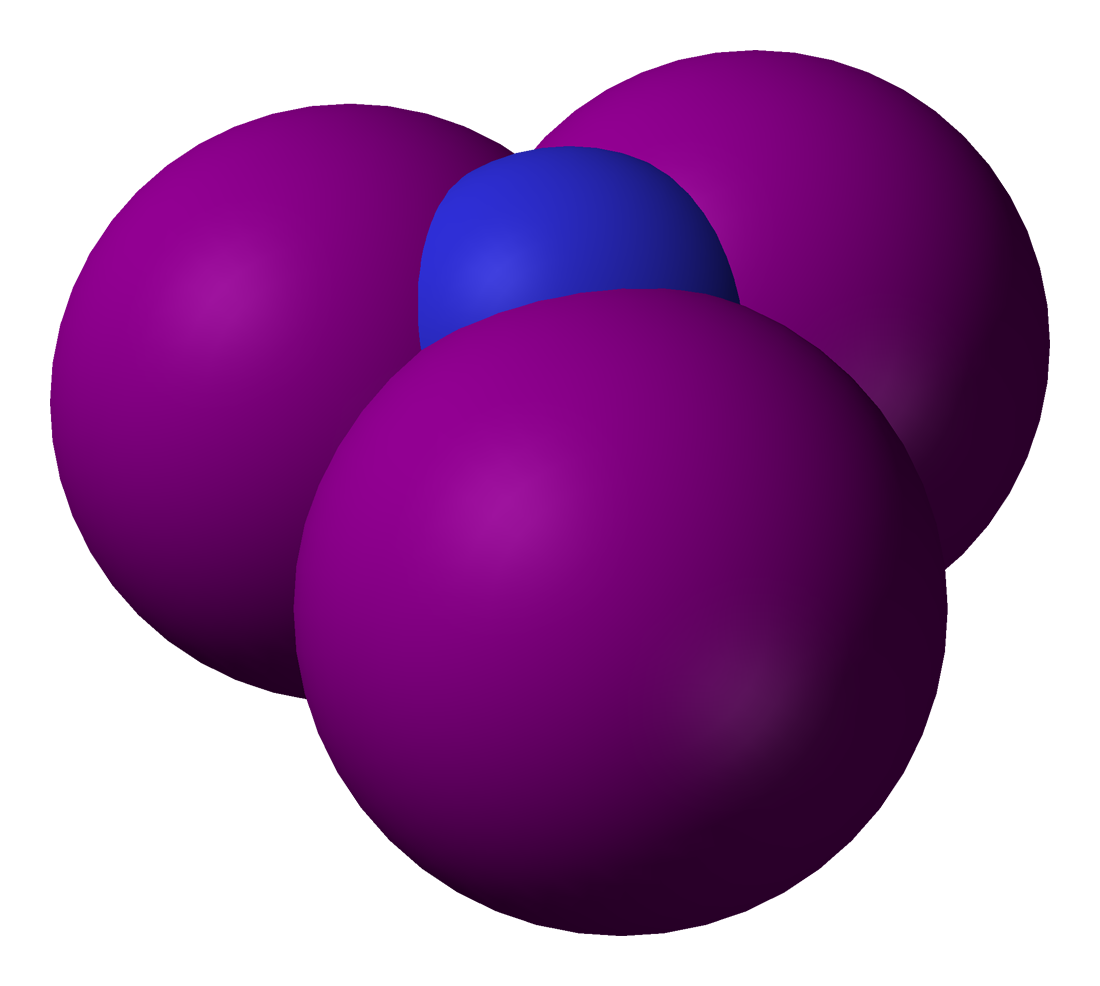
Nitrogen triiodide

Names
- IUPAC names Nitrogen triiodide Triiodoazane; Triiodidonitrogen
- Other names Nitrogen iodide Ammonia triiodide Touch Powder; Triiodine nitride Triiodine mononitride Triiodamine; Triiodoamine; Iodine nitride

Identifiers
CAS Number	13444-85-4
3D model (JSmol)	Interactive image
ChemSpider	55511
PubChem CID	61603
CompTox Dashboard (EPA)	DTXSID40893670
- InChI: InChI=1S/I3N/c1-4(2)3 Key: FZIONDGWZAKCEX-UHFFFAOYSA-N; InChI=1/I3N/c1-4(2)3 Key: FZIONDGWZAKCEX-UHFFFAOYAL
- SMILES: IN(I)I

Properties
Chemical formula	NI_{3}
Molar mass	394.719 g/mol
Appearance	dark solid
Boiling point	sublimes at −20 °C
Solubility in water	Insoluble
Solubility	organic solvents, such as diethyl ether

Hazards
- Occupational safety and health (OHS/OSH)
Main hazards	Extremely explosive and unstable
NFPA 704 (fire diamond)	3 0 4
- Except where otherwise noted, data are given for materials in their standard state (at 25 °C [77 °F], 100 kPa). verify (what is ?) Infobox references

Nitrogen triiodide is an inorganic compound with the formula NI_{3}. It is an extremely sensitive contact explosive: small quantities explode with a loud, sharp snap when touched even lightly, releasing a purple cloud of iodine vapor; it can even be detonated by alpha radiation. NI_{3} has a complex structural chemistry that is difficult to study because of the instability of the derivatives.

== Structure of NI_{3} and its derivatives ==
Nitrogen triiodide was first characterized by Raman spectroscopy in 1990, when it was prepared by an ammonia-free route. Boron nitride reacts with iodine monofluoride in trichlorofluoromethane at −30 °C to produce pure NI_{3} in low yield:

BN + 3 IF → NI_{3} + BF_{3}

NI_{3} is pyramidal (C_{3v} molecular symmetry), as are the other nitrogen trihalides and ammonia.

The material that is usually called "nitrogen triiodide" is prepared by the reaction of iodine with ammonia. When this reaction is conducted at low temperatures in anhydrous ammonia, the initial product is NI_{3} · (NH_{3})_{5}, but this material loses some ammonia upon warming to give the 1:1 adduct NI_{3} · NH_{3}. This adduct was first reported by Bernard Courtois in 1812, and its formula was finally determined in 1905 by Oswald Silberrad. Its solid state structure consists of chains of -NI_{2}-I-NI_{2}-I-NI_{2}-I-. Ammonia molecules are situated between the chains. When kept cold in the dark and damp with ammonia, NI_{3} · NH_{3} is stable.

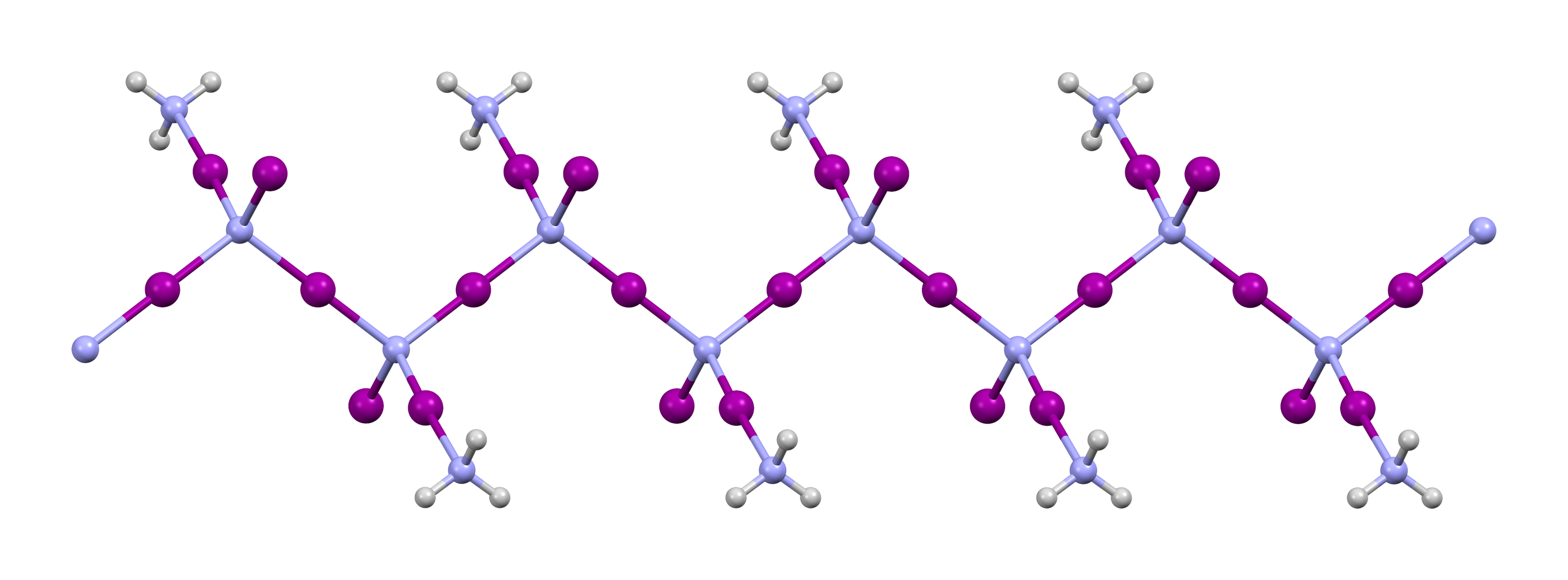

== Decomposition and explosiveness ==
Detonation of 15g of nitrogen triiodide

The instability of NI_{3} and NI_{3} · NH_{3} can be attributed to the large steric strain caused by the three large iodine atoms being held in proximity to each other around the relatively tiny nitrogen atom. This results in a very low activation energy for its decomposition, a reaction made even more favorable due to the great stability of N_{2}. Nitrogen triiodide has no practical commercial value due to its extreme shock sensitivity, making it impossible to store, transport, and utilize for controlled explosions. Whereas pure nitroglycerin is powerful and also greatly shock-sensitive (although not nearly as much so as nitrogen triiodide, which can be set off with the touch of a feather), it was only due to phlegmatizers that nitroglycerin's shock sensitivity was reduced and it became safer to handle and transport in the form of dynamite.

The decomposition of NI_{3} proceeds as follows to give nitrogen gas and iodine:

2 NI_{3} (s) → N_{2} (g) + 3 I_{2} (g) (−290 kJ/mol)

However, the dry material is a contact explosive, decomposing approximately as follows:

8 NI_{3} · NH_{3} → 5 N_{2} + 6 NH_{4}I + 9 I_{2}

Consistent with this equation, these explosions leave orange-to-purple stains of iodine, which can be removed with sodium thiosulfate solution. An alternate method of stain removal is to simply allow the iodine time to sublime. Small amounts of nitrogen triiodide are sometimes synthesized as a demonstration to high school chemistry students or as an act of "chemical magic." To highlight the sensitivity of the compound, it is usually detonated by touching it with a feather, but even the slightest air current, laser light, or other movement can cause detonation. Nitrogen triiodide is also notable for being the only known chemical explosive that detonates when exposed to alpha particles and nuclear fission products.
