= Phlegmatized explosive =

Explosive mixed with a stabilization or desensitization agent

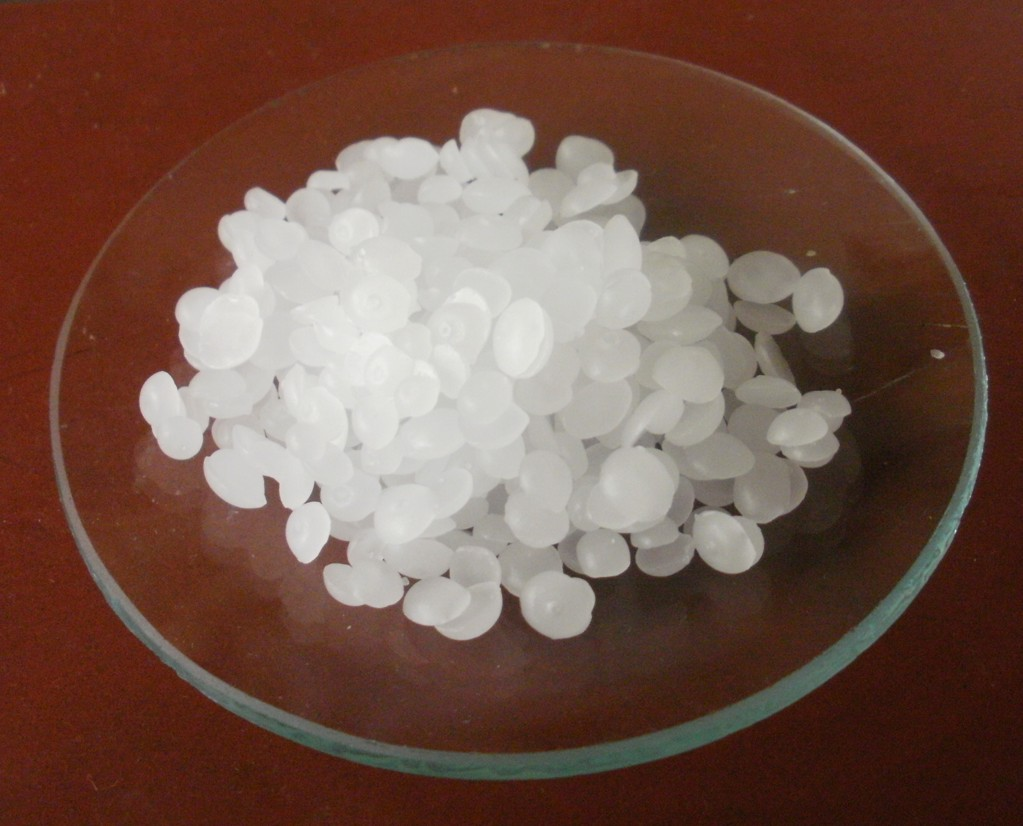
Prills of paraffin wax: a versatile, inexpensive, and popular phlegmatizing agent used in the high explosive fillings of various munitions

A phlegmatized explosive is an explosive that has had an agent (a phlegmatizer) added to stabilize or desensitize it. Phlegmatizing usually improves the handling properties of an explosive e.g. when munitions are filled in factories.

Trinitrotoluene can itself be used to phlegmatize more sensitive explosives such as RDX (to form Cyclotol), HMX (to form Octol), or PETN (to form Pentolite). Other typical phlegmatizing agents include paraffin wax (5% used in OKFOL and Composition H6), paper, or even water (used in water gel explosives). Such agents are nearly always flammable themselves (therefore adding fuel to the blast) or will at least boil off easily. Typically, a small amount of phlegmatizing agent is used, such as Composition B, which has 1% paraffin wax added, or the Russian RGO hand grenade which contains 90 grams of "A-IX-1" explosive, comprising 96% RDX and 4% paraffin wax by weight. Another example of use is the VS-50 antipersonnel mine, which contains an explosive filling of 43 grams of RDX, again phlegmatized by combining it with 10% paraffin wax by weight. As a general rule the amount of non-explosive phlegmatizing agent used (e.g. paraffin wax) is sufficient to improve handling properties of the explosive and/or reduce its sensitivity, whilst also ensuring that it can be reliably detonated via an explosive booster.

In the USA and Western Europe, compositions in which RDX is melted with wax are called 'Composition A' explosives. For example, Composition A3 is a pressable mixture of 91% RDX and 9% paraffin wax which is typically used in autocannon projectiles. Composition A4 contains a significantly increased proportion of explosive: 97% RDX with 3% wax. It is used in the Raufoss Mk 211 .50 BMG projectile.
