= List of UN numbers 0301 to 0400 =

UN numbers from UN0301 to UN0400 as assigned by the United Nations Committee of Experts on the Transport of Dangerous Goods are as follows:

== UN 0301 to UN 0400 ==
UN Number	Class	Proper Shipping Name
UN 0301	1.4G	Ammunition, tear-producing with burster, expelling charge, or propelling charge
UN 0302	?	(UN No. no longer in use)
UN 0303	1.4G	Ammunition, smoke, with or without burster, expelling charge, or propelling charge
UN 0304	?	(UN No. no longer in use)
UN 0305	1.3G	Flash powder
UN 0306	1.4G	Tracers for ammunition
UN 0307 to 0311	?	(UN No.s no longer in use)
UN 0312	1.4G	Cartridges, signal
UN 0313	1.2G	Signals, smoke
UN 0314	1.2G	Igniters
UN 0315	1.3G	Igniters
UN 0316	1.3G	Fuzes, igniting
UN 0317	1.4G	Fuzes, igniting
UN 0318	1.3G	Grenades, practice, hand or rifle
UN 0319	1.3G	Primers, tubular
UN 0320	1.4G	Primers, tubular
UN 0321	1.2E	Cartridges for weapons, with bursting charge
UN 0322	1.2L	Rocket motors with hypergolic liquids with or without an expelling charge
UN 0323	1.4S	Cartridges, power device
UN 0324	1.2F	Projectiles, with bursting charge
UN 0325	1.4G	Igniters
UN 0326	1.1C	Cartridges for weapons, blank
UN 0327	1.3C	Cartridges for weapons, blank or Cartridges, small arms, blank
UN 0328	1.2C	Cartridges for weapons, inert projectile
UN 0329	1.1E	Torpedoes with bursting charge
UN 0330	1.1F	Torpedoes with bursting charge
UN 0331	1.5D	Explosive, blasting, type B or Agent, blasting, Type B
UN 0332	1.5D	Explosive, blasting, type E or Agent, blasting, Type E
UN 0333	1.1G	Fireworks
UN 0334	1.2G	Fireworks
UN 0335	1.3G	Fireworks
UN 0336	1.4G	Fireworks
UN 0337	1.4S	Fireworks
UN 0338	1.4C	Cartridges for weapons, blank or Cartridges, small arms, blank
UN 0339	1.4C	Cartridges for weapons, inert projectile or Cartridges, small arms
UN 0340	1.1D	Nitrocellulose, dry or wetted with less than 25 percent water (or alcohol), by mass
UN 0341	1.1D	Nitrocellulose, unmodified or plasticized with less than 18 percent plasticizing substance, by mass
UN 0342	1.3C	Nitrocellulose, wetted with not less than 25 percent alcohol, by mass
UN 0343	1.3C	Nitrocellulose, plasticized with not less than 18 percent plasticizing substance, by mass
UN 0344	1.4D	Projectiles, with bursting charge
UN 0345	1.4S	Projectiles, inert with tracer
UN 0346	1.2D	Projectiles, with burster or expelling charge
UN 0347	1.4D	Projectiles, with burster or expelling charge
UN 0348	1.4F	Cartridges for weapons, with bursting charge
UN 0349	1.4S	Articles, explosive, n.o.s.
UN 0350	1.4B	Articles, explosive, n.o.s.
UN 0351	1.4C	Articles, explosive, n.o.s.
UN 0352	1.4D	Articles, explosive, n.o.s.
UN 0353	1.4G	Articles, explosive, n.o.s.
UN 0354	1.1L	Articles, explosive, n.o.s.
UN 0355	1.2L	Articles, explosive, n.o.s.
UN 0356	1.3L	Articles, explosive, n.o.s.
UN 0357	1.1L	Substances, explosive, n.o.s.
UN 0358	1.2L	Substances, explosive, n.o.s.
UN 0359	1.3L	Substances, explosive, n.o.s.
UN 0360	1.1B	Detonator assemblies, non-electric for blasting
UN 0361	1.4B	Detonator assemblies, non-electric for blasting
UN 0362	1.4G	Ammunition, practice
UN 0363	1.4G	Ammunition, proof
UN 0364	1.2B	Detonators for ammunition
UN 0365	1.4B	Detonators for ammunition
UN 0366	1.4S	Detonators for ammunition
UN 0367	1.4S	Fuzes, detonating
UN 0368	1.4S	Fuzes, igniting
UN 0369	1.1F	Warheads, rocket with bursting charge
UN 0370	1.4D	Warheads, rocket with burster or expelling charge
UN 0371	1.4F	Warheads, rocket with burster or expelling charge
UN 0372	1.2G	Grenades, practice, hand or rifle
UN 0373	1.4S	Signal devices, hand
UN 0374	1.1D	Sounding devices, explosive
UN 0375	1.2D	Sounding devices, explosive
UN 0376	1.4S	Primers, tubular
UN 0377	1.1B	Primers, cap type
UN 0378	1.4B	Primers, cap type
UN 0379	1.4C	Cases, cartridges, empty with primer
UN 0380	1.2L	Articles, pyrophoric
UN 0381	1.2C	Cartridges, power device
UN 0382	1.2B	Components, explosive train, n.o.s.
UN 0383	1.4B	Components, explosive train, n.o.s.
UN 0384	1.4S	Components, explosive train, n.o.s.
UN 0385	1.1D	5-Nitrobenzotriazol
UN 0386	1.1D	Trinitrobenzenesulfonic acid
UN 0387	1.1D	Trinitrofluorenone
UN 0388	1.1D	Trinitrotoluene and Trinitrobenzene mixtures or TNT and trinitrobenzene mixtures or TNT and hexanitrostilbene mixtures or Trinitrotoluene and hexanitrostilnene mixtures
UN 0389	1.1D	Trinitrotoluene mixtures containing Trinitrobenzene and Hexanitrostilbene or TNT mixtures containing trinitrobenzene and hexanitrostilbene
UN 0390	1.1D	Tritonal
UN 0391	1.1D	RDX and HMX mixtures, wetted with not less than 15 percent water by mass or RDX and HMX mixtures, desensitized with not less than 10 percent phlegmatizer by mass
UN 0392	1.1D	Hexanitrostilbene
UN 0393	1.1D	Hexotonal
UN 0394	1.1D	Trinitroresorcinol, wetted or Styphnic acid, wetted with not less than 20 percent water, or mixture of alcohol and water, by mass
UN 0395	1.2J	Rocket motors, liquid fueled
UN 0396	1.3J	Rocket motors, liquid fueled
UN 0397	1.1J	Rockets, liquid fueled with bursting charge
UN 0398	1.2J	Rockets, liquid fueled with bursting charge
UN 0399	1.1J	Bombs with flammable liquid, with bursting charge
UN 0400	1.2J	Bombs with flammable liquid, with bursting charge

== See also ==
- Explosives shipping classification system – Part of the United Nations Recommendations on the Transport of Dangerous Goods
