= Hexanitrostilbene =

Heat-resistant high explosive

Names
- Preferred IUPAC name 1,1′-[(E)-Ethane-1,2-diyl]bis(2,4,6-trinitrobenzene)
- Other names 1,2-bis-(2,4,6-trinitrophenyl)-ethylene; hexanitrodiphenylethylene, HNS

Identifiers
| CAS Number | 20062-22-0 |
| 3D model (JSmol) | Interactive image |
| ChemSpider | 10760172 |
| ECHA InfoCard | 100.039.525 |
| PubChem CID | 253628 |
| UNII | 5BV4WU3KB3 |
| UN number | 0392; TNT mixtures: 0388, 0389 |
| CompTox Dashboard (EPA) | DTXSID10864918 |
- InChI: InChI=1S/C14H6N6O12/c21-15(22)9-5-3-7(11(17(25)26)13(9)19(29)30)1-2-8-4-6-10(16(23)24)14(20(31)32)12(8)18(27)28/h1-6H/b2-1+ Key: LQXXGLZCVKSCEV-OWOJBTEDSA-N; InChI=1/C14H6N6O12/c21-15(22)9-5-3-7(11(17(25)26)13(9)19(29)30)1-2-8-4-6-10(16(23)24)14(20(31)32)12(8)18(27)28/h1-6H/b2-1+ Key: LQXXGLZCVKSCEV-OWOJBTEDBF
- SMILES: O=N(=O)C1=CC(N(=O)=O)=C(/C=C/C2=C(N(=O)=O)C=C(N(=O)=O)C=C2N(=O)=O)C(N(=O)=O)=C1

Properties
| Chemical formula | C_{14}H_{6}N_{6}O_{12} |
| Molar mass | 450.23 g/mol |
| Appearance | Yellow crystalline powder |
| Density | 1.7 g/cm^{3} |
| Melting point | 316 °C (601 °F; 589 K) |

Explosive data
| Shock sensitivity | Low |
| Friction sensitivity | Low |
| Detonation velocity | 7000 m/s |
- Except where otherwise noted, data are given for materials in their standard state (at 25 °C [77 °F], 100 kPa). verify (what is ?) Infobox references

Hexanitrostilbene (HNS), also called JD-X, is an organic compound with the formula [(O_{2}N)_{3}C_{6}H_{2}CH]_{2}. It is a yellow-orange solid. It is used as a heat-resistant high explosive. It is slightly soluble (0.1 - 5 g/100 mL) in butyrolactone, DMF, DMSO, and N-methylpyrrolidone.

== Production and use ==
It is produced by oxidizing trinitrotoluene (TNT) with chlorine bleach (sodium hypochlorite). HNS boasts a higher insensitivity to heat than TNT, and like TNT it is insensitive to impact. When casting TNT, HNS is added at 0.5% to form erratic micro-crystals within the TNT, which prevent cracking. Because of its insensitivity but high explosive properties, HNS is used in space missions. It was the main explosive fill in the seismic source generating mortar ammunition canisters used as part of the Apollo Lunar Active Seismic Experiments.

Its heat of detonation is 4 kJ/g.

It was developed by the chemist Kathryn Grove Shipp at the U.S. Naval Ordnance Laboratory in the 1960s and has been improved on since then.

== See also ==
- TNT equivalent
- RE factor
