= C6H3N3O8 =

The molecular formula C_{6}H_{3}N_{3}O_{8} may refer to:

- Styphnic acid
