= List of UN numbers 0201 to 0300 =

UN numbers from UN0201 to UN0300 as assigned by the United Nations Committee of Experts on the Transport of Dangerous Goods are as follows:

== UN 0201 to UN 0300 ==
UN Number	Class	Proper Shipping Name
UN 0201 to 0202	?	(UN No.s no longer in use)
UN 0203	?	(UN No. no longer in use) Sodium salts of nitro-aromatic derivatives, n.o.s. (UN No. no longer in use)
UN 0204	1.2F	Sounding devices, explosive
UN 0205	?	(UN No. no longer in use)
UN 0206	?	(UN No. no longer in use) Squibs (UN No. no longer in use)
UN 0207	1.1D	Tetranitroaniline
UN 0208	1.1D	Trinitrophenylmethylnitramine or Tetryl
UN 0209	1.1D	Trinitrotoluene or TNT, dry or wetted with less than 30 percent water, by mass
UN 0210 to 0211	?	(UN No.s no longer in use)
UN 0212	1.3G	Tracers for ammunition
UN 0213	1.1D	Trinitroanisole
UN 0214	1.1D	Trinitrobenzene, dry or wetted with less than 30 percent water, by mass
UN 0215	1.1D	Trinitrobenzoic acid, dry or wetted with less than 30 percent water, by mass
UN 0216	1.1D	Trinitro-meta-cresol
UN 0217	1.1D	Trinitronaphthalene
UN 0218	1.1D	Trinitrophenetole
UN 0219	1.1D	Trinitroresorcinol or Styphnic acid, dry or wetted with less than 20 percent water, or mixture of alcohol and water, by mass
UN 0220	1.1D	Urea nitrate, dry or wetted with less than 20 percent water, by mass
UN 0221	1.1D	Warheads, torpedo with bursting charge
UN 0222	1.1D	Ammonium nitrate, with more than 0.2 percent combustible substances, including any organic substance calculated as carbon, to the exclusion of any other added substance
UN 0223	1	(UN No. no longer in use) Ammonium nitrate fertilizers (UN No. no longer in use)
UN 0224	1.1A	Barium azide, dry or wetted with less than 50 percent water, by mass
UN 0225	1.1B	Boosters with detonator
UN 0226	1.1D	Cyclotetramethylenetetranitramine, wetted or HMX, wetted or Octogen, wetted with not less than 15 percent water, by mass
UN 0227 to 0233	?	(UN No.s no longer in use)
UN 0234	1.3C	Sodium dinitro-o-cresolate, dry or wetted with less than 15 percent of water, by mass
UN 0235	1.3C	Sodium picramate, dry or wetted with less than 20 percent water, by mass
UN 0236	1.3C	Zirconium picramate, dry or wetted less than 20 percent water, by mass
UN 0237	1.4D	Charges, shaped, flexible, linear
UN 0238	1.2G	Rockets, line-throwing
UN 0239	?	(UN No. no longer in use)
UN 0240	1.3G	Rockets, line-throwing
UN 0241	1.1D	Explosive, blasting, type E
UN 0242	1.3C	Charges, propelling, for cannon
UN 0243	1.2H	Ammunition, incendiary, white phosphorus, with burster, expelling charge, or propelling charge
UN 0244	1.3H	Ammunition, incendiary, white phosphorus, with burster, expelling charge, or propelling charge
UN 0245	1.2H	Ammunition smoke, white phosphorus with burster, expelling charge, or propelling charge
UN 0246	1.3H	Ammunition smoke, white phosphorus with burster, expelling charge, or propelling charge
UN 0247	1.3J	Ammunition, incendiary liquid or gel, with burster, expelling charge, or propelling charge
UN 0248	1.2L	Contrivances, water-activated, with burster, expelling charge, or propelling charge
UN 0249	1.3L	Contrivances, water-activated, with burster, expelling charge, or propelling charge
UN 0250	1.3L	Rocket motors with hypergolic liquids with or without an expelling charge
UN 0251 to 0253	?	(UN No.s no longer in use)
UN 0254	1.3G	Ammunition, illuminating with or without burster, expelling charge, or propelling charge
UN 0255	1.4B	Detonators, electric, for blasting
UN 0256	?	(UN No. no longer in use)
UN 0257	1.4B	Fuzes, detonating
UN 0258 to 0265	?	(UN No.s no longer in use)
UN 0266	1.1D	Octolite or Octol, dry or wetted with less than 15 percent water, by mass
UN 0267	1.4B	Detonators, non-electric, for blasting
UN 0268	1.2B	Boosters with detonator
UN 0269 to 0270	?	(UN No.s no longer in use)
UN 0271	1.1C	Charges, propelling
UN 0272	1.3C	Charges, propelling
UN 0273	?	(UN No. no longer in use) Charges, propelling, for rocket motors (UN No. no longer in use)
UN 0274	?	(UN No. no longer in use) Charges, propelling, for rocket motors (UN No. no longer in use)
UN 0275	1.3C	Cartridges, power device
UN 0276	1.4C	Cartridges, power device
UN 0277	1.3C	Cartridges, oil well
UN 0278	1.4C	Cartridges, oil well
UN 0279	1.1C	Charges, propelling, for cannon
UN 0280	1.1C	Rocket motors
UN 0281	1.2C	Rocket motors
UN 0282	1.1D	Nitroguanidine or Picrite, dry or wetted with less than 20 percent water, by mass
UN 0283	1.2D	Boosters, without detonator
UN 0284	1.1D	Grenades, hand or rifle, with bursting charge
UN 0285	1.2D	Grenades, hand or rifle, with bursting charge
UN 0286	1.1D	Warheads, rocket with bursting charge
UN 0287	1.2D	Warheads, rocket with bursting charge
UN 0288	1.1D	Charges, shaped, flexible, linear
UN 0289	1.4D	Cord, detonating, flexible
UN 0290	1.1D	Cord, detonating or Fuse, detonating metal clad
UN 0291	1.2F	Bombs, with bursting charge
UN 0292	1.1F	Grenades, hand or rifle, with bursting charge
UN 0293	1.2F	Grenades, hand or rifle, with bursting charge
UN 0294	1.2F	Mines with bursting charge
UN 0295	1.2F	Rockets, with bursting charge
UN 0296	1.1F	Sounding devices, explosive
UN 0297	1.4G	Ammunition, illuminating with or without burster, expelling charge, or propelling charge
UN 0298	?	(UN No. no longer in use)
UN 0299	1.3G	Bombs, photo-flash
UN 0300	1.4G	Ammunition, incendiary with or without burster, expelling charge, or propelling charge

== See also ==
- Lists of UN numbers
