= 2,4,6-Trinitrobenzenesulfonic acid =

2,4,6-Trinitrobenzene Sulfonic Acid
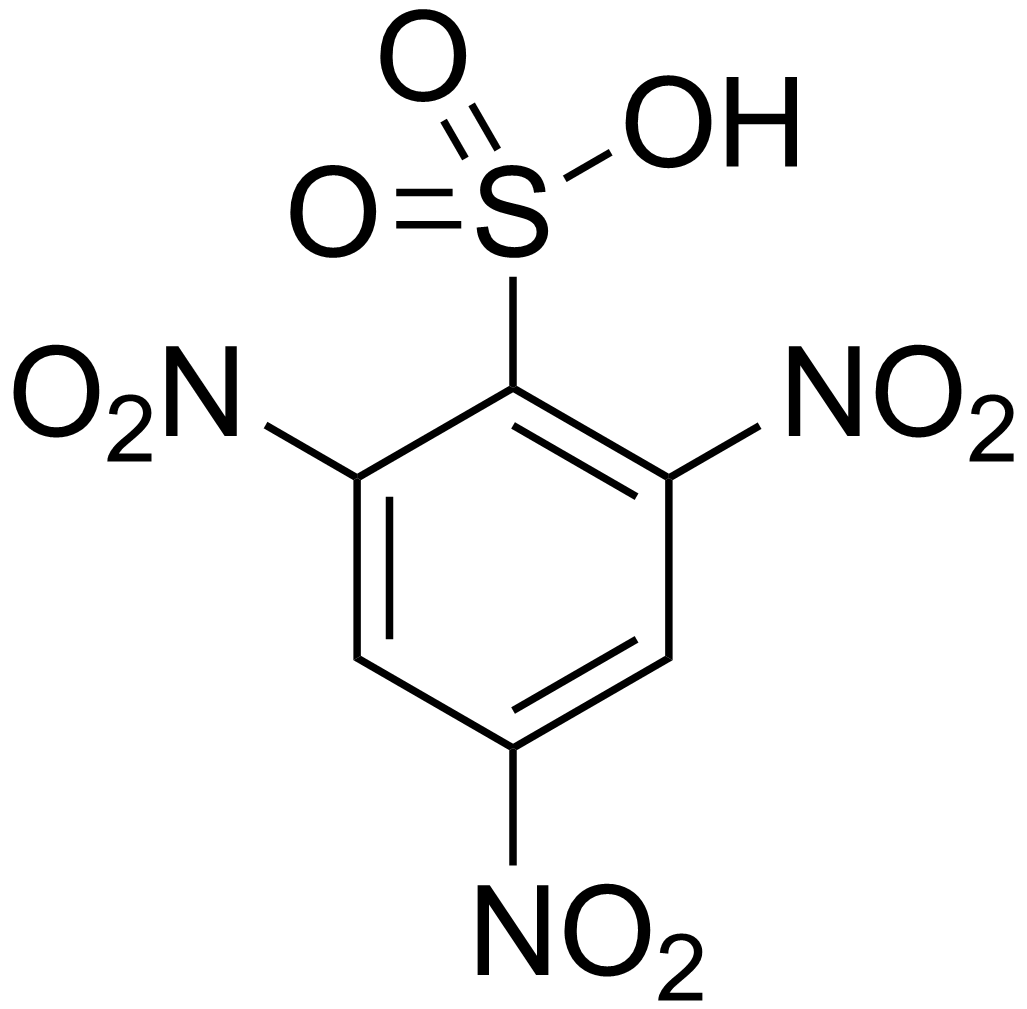

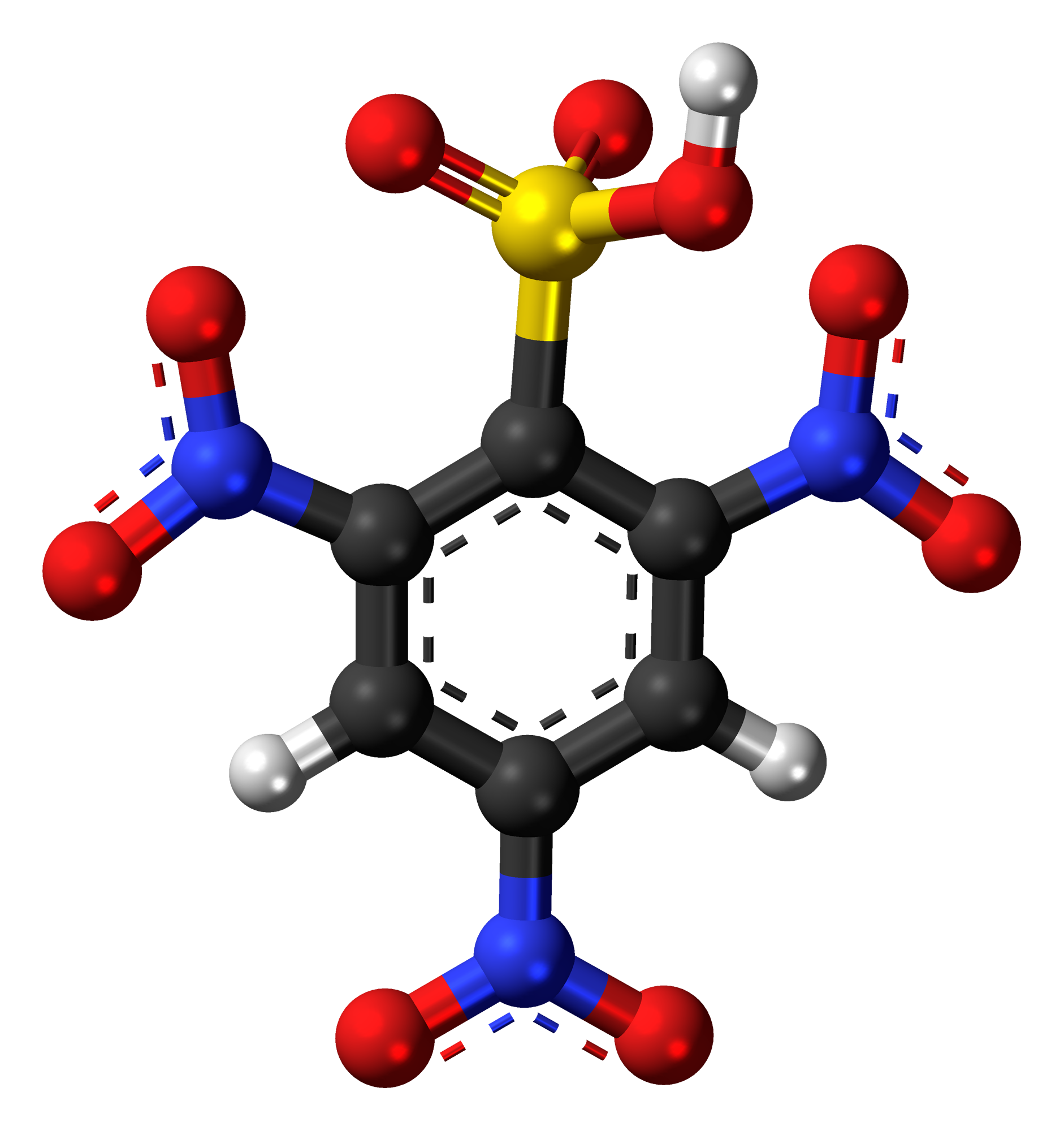

Names
- Preferred IUPAC name 2,4,6-Trinitrobenzene-1-sulfonic acid
- Other names Picrylsulfonic acid; Trinitrobenzene sulfonate; TNBS

Identifiers
CAS Number	2508-19-2
3D model (JSmol)	Interactive image
Beilstein Reference	572358
ChEBI	CHEBI:53063
ChEMBL	ChEMBL3586251
ChemSpider	10577
ECHA InfoCard	100.017.925
EC Number	219-717-7
Gmelin Reference	1051138
PubChem CID	11045
UNII	8T3HQG2ZC4
UN number	0386
CompTox Dashboard (EPA)	DTXSID0043715
- InChI: InChI=1S/C6H3N3O9S/c10-7(11)3-1-4(8(12)13)6(19(16,17)18)5(2-3)9(14)15/h1-2H,(H,16,17,18) Key: NHJVRSWLHSJWIN-UHFFFAOYSA-N; InChI=1/C6H3N3O9S/c10-7(11)3-1-4(8(12)13)6(19(16,17)18)5(2-3)9(14)15/h1-2H,(H,16,17,18) Key: NHJVRSWLHSJWIN-UHFFFAOYAG
- SMILES: O=S(=O)(O)c1c(cc(cc1[N+]([O-])=O)[N+]([O-])=O)[N+]([O-])=O

Properties
Chemical formula	C_{6}H_{3}N_{3}O_{9}S
Molar mass	293.16 g·mol^{−1}
Density	0.955 g/cm^{3}

Hazards
- GHS labelling
Pictograms	(GHS01: Explosive) (GHS05: Corrosive) (GHS06: Toxic)
Signal word	Danger
Hazard statements	H317, H334
Precautionary statements	P261, P272, P280, P285, P302+P352, P304+P341, P321, P333+P313, P342+P311, P363, P501
NFPA 704 (fire diamond)	2 4 4 OX

Related compounds
Related compounds	Picric acid Trinitroanisole
- Except where otherwise noted, data are given for materials in their standard state (at 25 °C [77 °F], 100 kPa). verify (what is ?) Infobox references

Trinitrobenzenesulfonic acid (C_{6}H_{3}N_{3}O_{9}S) is a nitroaryl oxidizing acid and explosive, used in biochemical research.

== Uses ==
Its primary usage is primarily to neutralize peptide terminal amino groups in scientific research. Occasionally it is used as a detonator for certain other explosive compounds.

The compound is currently being investigated for its effects on the immune system. It is used to induce colitis in the colon of laboratory animals in order to model inflammatory bowel disease and post-infectious irritable bowel syndrome.

== Safety precautions ==
The compound has generally not been investigated for toxicity. However, the primary hazard of working with 2,4,6-trinitrobenzenesulfonic acid is the risk of explosion. Similar to other polynitroaryl acids (e.g. picric acid, TNT), 2,4,6-trinitrobenzenesulfonic acid can explode when heated strongly and mechanically disturbed, even in the presence of common phlegmatizers such as water. It will rapidly heat to ignition if exposed to medium-strong reducing agents, including hydrides, sulfides, and nitrides.
