= Una Lucy Silberrad =

British writer (1872–1955)

- Born: 8 May 1872; Buckhurst Hill, Essex, England
- Died: 1 September 1955 (aged 83); Burnham-on-Crouch, Essex, England
- Occupation: Author
- Relatives: Sister of Oswald Silberrad

Una Lucy Silberrad (8 May 1872 – 1 September 1955) was a British author. She wrote about 40 novels, often characterized as "middlebrow", which highlight conservative middle-class virtues even as they focus on capable female protagonists.

== Topics ==
It was not until 1899 when Silberrad was 27 years old that her first novel, The Enchanter, was published. It received one of its first reviews in The Bookman, a trade periodical published in New York and London. After 1899 she wrote and published regularly. Of her more than 40 titles, most were novels. She also wrote short stories and a few non-fictional works. Her first 26 books were published by a variety of publishers, based in London and New York, but the second half of her oeuvre came out with Hutchinson & Co. Her permanent literary agent was A. P. Watt & Co. Apart from her fictional work, she wrote one work on horticulture: Dutch Bulbs and Gardens, a collaborative work written after a visit to the Netherlands. It contains appendices by Sophia Lyall and illustrations by Mina Nixon.

Her writing was most likely intended for a conservative middle-class, middlebrow audience. Her novels contain many allusions to other literary works and concepts, but her prose style, which might be classified as late-Victorian, is eclectic. She reused several literary topics that are closely connected with her life, including geographical locations, such as Essex, the North of England and the City of London. Another recurring theme is the sciences, particularly chemistry and alchemy, which appear in over half of her novels, undoubtedly using her brother's professional experiences and education: Oswald Silberrad was a renowned early 20th-century chemist. Several early works feature a brother of the heroine who studies chemistry. A colophon in Keren of Lowbole (1913) describes her own attempts at making artificial lapis lazuli (ultramarine) and ether.

=== Middlebrow/Middle class ===
The requirement for economic success is one of the indicators of middlebrow writing. Silberrad's novels "are clearly targeted to a conservative middle-class audience". Her works were frequently published in reprint series, decent but inexpensive copies which catered for the needs of the increasing numbers of potential readers, particularly among the suburban middle classes.

Ross McKibbin defines middlebrow novels as "reasonably well written and usually (though certainly not always) about non-trivial subjects [and] at least approachable." Harold Williams' description of Silberrad's style of writing corresponds to this definition. His view of Silberrad is that she “has less gift as a stylist, and her method is sometimes crude, but she is observant, her characters live and her tales are marked by a kind of conscious energy.” Nicola Humble furthermore defines the feminine middlebrow literature of Silberrad’s time as “a powerful force in establishing and consolidating, but also in resisting, new class and gender identities […]." Analogously, Silberrad demonstrates a high degree of class-consciousness and shows the typical measuring of a middlebrow world against other values. The Good Comrade (1907), for instance, reflects the negotiation of cultural and class-related values on various levels. Also with respect to gender roles, Silberrad integrates critiques of gender relations and stereotypes into her fiction, whilst retaining typical middlebrow narrative frameworks, such as the ‘romance that ends in marriage’ topos (see below).

=== Silberrad and the Victorian and Edwardian periods ===
Many of Silberrad's early works are deeply rooted in the Victorian era. Not only does she take up and mix popular 19th-century genres such as melodrama, romance, and Gothic fiction, but she is also preoccupied with late Victorian and Edwardian concerns such as class and gender.

The emerging 'New Woman' and the growing universal suffrage movements led Silberrad to place different female characters in the center of her fiction. Her women struggle to find the best possible positions for themselves in life. Often the author finally seems to advocate a middle position between the meek and obedient 'angel in the house' and the radical suffragette. She portrays women who find contentment through their independence of mind, education, and the little freedoms they fight for and obtain in their homes.

From the Edwardian period onwards, Silberrad's writing becomes more conscious of class questions. This becomes obvious in Rawson-Clew, the aristocratic hero of her novel The Good Comrade. He is most often depicted in the street or in other public places. His house in the North of England is only mentioned in passing and is never described in detail. This gives the aristocratic spaces he inhabits a certain utopian quality which is at once affirmative of the aristocracy and conscious of the fact that as a class it is far removed from the reality of life. Instead, it is the middle class that is gaining new importance.

This new middle class is represented by the novel's heroine, practical and resourceful Julia Polkington who fights through adverse situations and emerges victorious. It is her diligence and moral disposition that will determine the future society. Not only does Julia renew the aristocracy through her marriage to Rawson-Clew, but she also negotiates gender relations. Before agreeing to the marriage, the young woman sets conditions for it which Rawson-Clew obviously accepts. To ensure its continuing existence, the aristocracy has to move towards the middle class. Only by combining the strengths of both classes, social stability can be maintained.

Apart from depicting shifts in the English class structure, the relationship between Julia and Rawson-Clew is also exemplary of a new orientation with respect to gender questions. Marriages in which freedom, equality, and mutual respect are dominant are portrayed as the future. Silberrad perceives social changes in Edwardian society but does not treat them harshly. She rather focuses on the gradual and almost imperceptible changes that shape future society. The only Victorian 'institution' she mercilessly exposes in The Good Comrade is the family. Its slow decline is visible in the Polkingtons, individuals who express selfish desires aimed at a good appearance rather than upholding moral values. The only exception again is Julia, the 'middle' daughter who takes charge of her own life. And again it could be said that she finally sets up a new family on her own terms with Rawson-Clew. The treatment of class as well as gender questions shows Una Silberrad's penchant for advocating gradual change and middle courses.

=== Emancipation ===
From her early narrative texts onwards, Silberrad consistently casts female protagonists with independent and self-determined lives, who are contrasted with sets of ridiculously unemancipated women, often ludicrous striving after the 'good match'. Silberrad's female protagonists embody an entirely different type of femininity, moving with ease in traditionally male circles, while also working self-consciously as scientists, politicians, or even self-appointed spies. They are emancipated in spirit and fearless in the face of public opinion.

Despite this, Silberrad's attitude towards the more political side of the issue of female emancipation seems ambiguous. In The Good Comrade she addresses the question of emancipation directly:

[…] he remarked, "I think girls are usually brought up with too much protection; I mean girls of our class, they are too much shielded; one has them for the house only; if they were flowers I would call them stove-plants." Julia laughed. "You believe in the emancipation of women then?" she said; "you would rather a woman could take care of herself, and not be afraid than be womanly?" "No," he answered; "I would like them to be both, as you are."

This scene illustrates the way in which Silberrad implicitly scrutinizes male attitudes towards the role of women in society. The cautious, tongue-in-cheek question of the female character works inductively. She aims to win the respect of her male counterpart by immersion rather than conversion. As in so many of Silberrad's texts, a pointedly modern stance in these matters is not a question of political campaigning but remains that of a state of mind. Emancipation is implicit rather than explicit, shown through one's small daily achievements and decisions rather than through radical speeches or political actions.

The dictate of the happy end in the middlebrow novel requires her female protagonists to settle in matrimony. However, while such an ending may cause some dismay for readers who had hoped for a more accentuated feminist settlement one cannot ignore the fact that within Silberrad's vision of the traditional corset of marriage gender roles and their hegemonic balance are re-negotiated and thereby self-consciously re-calibrated. Modernization takes place within the institutional frameworks of society but does not operate against them. It follows from this that Silberrad communicates what must seem small-scale changes to an existing worldview but never opts for its radical discontinuation. This may sometimes disappoint in its calm if not cautious detachment from the radicalism of the modernist movement. However, Silberrad's writing reveals the osmotic and thus gradual domestication of modern thinking in the wider realms of British society in the early decades of the 20th century.

=== Religion ===
Silberrad was a regular churchgoer, being a staunch member of the Church of England. She was also well acquainted with a Quaker family in Buckhurst Hill in Epping Forest, her birthplace. References to both Church of England doctrines and Quaker beliefs are a common thread in her literary works, particularly in her historical fiction. The Wedding of Lady Lovell (1905) comprises short stories depicting the dissenter Tobiah who overcomes evil in other characters' lives, e.g. seemingly illegitimate relationships or domestic violence. Other novels dealing with Quaker beliefs are The Second Book of Tobiah (1906) and Sampson Rideout, Quaker (1911). The narrators' comments on the Quaker characters oscillate between respect for their principles and ironic distance towards their outlandish and eccentric behavior.

The Good Comrade (1907) discusses differences between societies following the Church of England and social circles influenced by Calvinist teachings. Again, the narrator treats both sides ambivalently. The irony rests more on the restrictive, Calvinist-inspired family the main character Julia works for during her stay in the Netherlands.

Echoing her frequent comparisons of the obscure practice of alchemy with modern science, Silberrad contrasts Protestant faith with rites rooted in Catholic or pagan tradition. Simon Scroat in "The Wedding of Lady Lovell" performs a Satanic ritual to kill Tobiah the dissenter – only to be overcome by Tobiah. Fortune telling, witchcraft and fear of the occult powers of gypsies find discussion in Curayl (1906), Keren of Lowbole (1913) and many other texts. In general, the texts treat such practices as a result of irrational superstition.

In later life, at Burnham-on-Crouch, Silberrad was also a leading member of the Women's Institute.

== Private life ==
Silberrad first lived at Buckhurst Hill, and moved to Burnham-on-Crouch later in life. She was an elder sister of the chemist Oswald Silberrad, and some fragments of his scientific work appear in her fiction. She never married.

== Works ==
=== Novels ===
- The Enchanter (1899)
- Lady of Dreams (1900)
- Princess Puck (1902)
- The Success of Mark Wyngate (1902)
- Petronilla Heroven (1903)
- Curayl (1906)
- The Good Comrade (1907)
- Desire (1908, reprinted 2018; ISBN 978-1-9998280-2-8)
- Ordinary People (1909)
- The Affairs of John Bolsover (1911)
- Sampson Rideout, Quaker (1911)
- The Real Presence (1912)
- Success (1912)
- Keren of Lowbole (1913)
- Cuddy Yarborough's Daughter (1914)
- Co-Directors (1915)
- The Mystery of Barnard Hanson (1915)
- The Inheritance (1916)
- The Lyndwood Affair (1918)
- Green Pastures (1919)
- Jim Robinson (1920)
- Rachel and her Relations (1921)
- The Honest Man (1922)
- The Letters of Jean Armiter (1923)
- Joe, A Simple Soul (1924 or 1925)
- The Vow of Micah Jordan (1925)
- Blackstones. A Novel. (1926)
- The Book of Sanchia Stapleton (1927)
- In the Course of Years (1929)
- The Romance of Peter Waine, Timber Merchant (1931)
- The Will of James Mark Crane (1932)
- The Last Page of the Book (1933)
- The Strange Story in the Falconer Papers (1934)
- Saunders (1935)
- Sun in November (1937)
- The Abundance of Things (1939)
- The Escape of Andrew Cole (1941)
- The Three Men who went to Ardath, 1760 (1943 or 1944)

=== Short stories ===
- "A Romance of the Molehill Country". Leisure Hour(1896)
- "The Temptation of Ezekiel". Everybody's Magazine 5.28 (1901)
- "Mrs Smallpage's John". PALL MALL MAGAZINE 30 (1903): 342–361
- "Priscilla's Maying". PALL MALL MAGAZINE 31 (1903): 203–218
- "The Dower Chest of Ann Ponsford". Blackwood's Magazine (Feb 1903): 190–221
- "The Winning of Elizabeth Fothergill". Blackwood's Magazine (May 1903): 638–667
- "The Witchcraft of Chuma". Harper's Monthly Magazine 108 (Feb 1904): 428–437.
- "In the course of business". Daily Mail (1904)
- "Concerning the Death of James Deering". PALL MALL MAGAZINE 32 (1904): 156–164
- The Wedding of Lady Lovell, and Other Matches of Tobiah's Making (1905)
- The Second Book of Tobiah (1906 or 1907)
- "In the Course of Business". LONDON MAGAZINE. 18 (1907): 43–48
- "Monsieur Abraham". LONDON MAGAZINE 18 (1907): 681–8
- "The Test". Harper's Monthly Magazine 115 (November 1907): 690
- "Concerning the Wreck of the Merry Rose". Gunter's Magazine 8 (Jan 1909)
- "The Burning of Babel". Harper's Monthly Magazine 119 (Oct 1909): 713
- Declined With Thanks, etc (1911)

=== Non-fiction ===
- Dutch Bulbs and Gardens (1909) (painted by Mina Nixon, described by Una Silberrad and Sophie Lyall)

== Bibliography ==
- Macdonald, Kate. "Edwardian transitions in the fiction of Una L Silberrad (1872–1955)". English Literature in Transition, 54.1 (January 2011, forthcoming).
- Fox, Tony. "Una Silberrad, Authoress, 1872–1955". Essex Journal 44.2 (Autumn 2009): 58–63.
- Kemp, Sandra, Mitchell, Charlotte, Trotter, David (eds) Edwardian Fiction: An Oxford Companion (Oxford University Press, 1997, ISBN 0-19-811760-4)
- Williams, Harold. Modern English Writers – Being a Study of Imaginative Literature 1890–1914. Sidgwick & Jackson, 1918. Naismith Press, 2007. (ISBN 978-1406738100)
