= Ednatol =

Ednatol is a yellow high explosive, comprising about 55% ethylenedinitramine (a.k.a. Haleite or Explosive H) and 45% TNT by weight. It was developed in the United States circa 1935 and used as a substitute for Composition B in large general purpose and fragmentation bombs. It has a detonation velocity of approximately 7,400 metres per second. It is a uniform blend with a melting point of 80 °C.

Ednatol was also used as pentolite is used: in rockets, grenades and high-explosive antitank shells. Ednatol was cast in the same manner as amatol. The resulting explosive was stable, non-hygroscopic and could be stored for long periods.

Ednatol has no civilian applications. It was developed by the U.S. Army at Picatinny Arsenal exclusively intended for military use and was especially popular during the Second World War. It is now an obsolete explosive and therefore unlikely to be encountered, except in legacy munitions and unexploded ordnance.
