= Ecological impact of explosives =

Effects of explosive materials on the environment

Ecological impacts of explosives are the effects that both unexploded explosives and post-explosion by-products have on the environment. Explosive derived contaminants may have adverse effects on the environmental as well as human health.

In addition to their military use in warfare, explosives are also used in construction and demolition. Of greatest concern to the environment are secondary explosives, such as TNT, RDX, and HMX because they are produced and used in the greatest quantities.

Explosives and their residual post explosion products can partition between multiple environmental compartments including aquatic, soil, atmosphere, and the biosphere.

== Magnitude of exposure ==
Explosives have important applications in the military and in both mining and construction work. In fact, the manufacture of explosives comprises a large amount of the chemical industry. In the course of their production, handling, loading, and disposal, explosives are released into the environment. It is there that they are dispersed by mechanical processes or dissolved or volatilized and partially converted to secondary products. Over the past 150 years, millions of tons of explosives have been produced for military applications and other activities that have led to the accidental contamination of energetic materials in the soil and groundwater. Exact numbers cannot be obtained and estimations are generally conservative, because people make their own bombs, which is not a small activity in regions dealing with armed conflict. The United States Army had estimated that over 1.2 million tons of soils have been contaminated with explosives on their training grounds alone. In the year 2004, it was estimated that 2,520,000 metric tons of explosive agents were sold for consumption in the United States alone. Figure 1 shows the world consumption of explosives in 2008.

Generally, explosives are dispersed mainly when used in combat. Most explosives are used as warfare agents by militaries globally. However, modern uses for 2,4,6-trinitrotoluene (TNT) are associated with construction and demolition, rather than combat. Because of its use in construction and demolition, it has become perhaps the most widespread explosive, and thus its toxicity is the most characterized and reported. The concentration of TNT in contaminated soil can reach 50 g kg^{−1} of soil, where the highest concentrations can be found on or near the surface. In the last decade, the United States Environmental Protection Agency (USEPA) has declared TNT a pollutant whose removal is priority. The USEPA maintains that TNT levels in soil should not exceed 17.2 gram per kilogram of soil and 0.01 milligrams per liter of water.

== Degradation ==
Explosives and their post-explosion by-products may be degraded by abiotic processes that include hydrolysis, oxidation, or photolysis. Explosives may also be broken down through metabolism by microorganisms.

== See also ==
- Environmental impact of war
- Formerly Used Defense Sites
- Biodegradation
- Advanced oxidation process
- TNT § Ecological impact
