= OKFOL =

Explosive material

OKFOL (Russian: ОКФОЛ) is an explosive, used in a variety of applications (namely shaped charges). It is particularly suitable for use in shaped charges. It normally consists of 95% HMX phlegmatized with 5% wax. It has a density of 1.761 to 1.813 grams per cubic centimetre, explosive velocity of 8,670 metres per second and a TNT equivalent of 1.70.

OKFOL is most notably used as the warhead's explosive in Russian/Soviet ATGMs, namely in the warhead of the 9M133 Kornet, 9K113 Konkurs and 9K111 Fagot, and other AT weaponry like the RPG-7 (PG-7V and PG-7VR) or the SPG-9 (specifically PG-9N warhead).

== See also ==
- Octol, another HMX-based explosive.
