= Kathryn Grove Shipp =

American organic chemist (1904–1977)

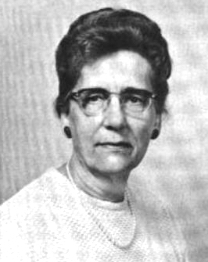
- Kathryn Grove Shipp, from a 1967 publication of the Department of the Navy.
- Born: Kathryn Elmira Grove; 1904; Annandale, Pennsylvania
- Died: October 14, 1977; Tiburon, California
- Occupation: Chemist
- Known for: Federal Woman's Award (1967), patents on explosives

Kathryn Grove Shipp (1904 – October 14, 1977) was an American organic chemist, a specialist in explosives, affiliated with the Naval Ordnance Laboratory from 1957 to 1970. In 1967, she was one of the six recipients of the Federal Woman's Award.

== Early life ==
Kathryn Elmira Grove was born in Annandale, Pennsylvania. She and her sister Ruth were raised in the household of an uncle and aunt, William Smith Conner and Carolyn W. Conner, in Madera, California, after their parents died. She graduated from Madera High School in 1921 and from Mills College in 1925, where she studied under Aurelia Henry Reinhardt. She completed her doctorate in organic chemistry at Yale University in 1930, with a postdoctoral year of further studies at Oxford on a National Research Council fellowship. While at Yale, she was the first woman graduate student to hold the Dupont Fellowship in Chemistry.

== Career ==
Shipp was an assistant instructor in chemistry at Vassar College in 1925. She left paid employment for 26 years to raise her children, before returning to laboratory chemistry in 1957, when she joined the Naval Ordnance Laboratory in White Oak, Maryland. In 1964, she developed hexanitrostilbene (HNS), a vacuum-tolerant, heat-insensitive explosive used for seismic experiments on the moon, during the Apollo program. "Here I am, a horse and buggy chemist, working in a nuclear age," she commented on her career in 1967. She retired from the Naval Research Laboratory in 1970.

== Awards and patents ==
Shipp received the Navy's Meritorious Civilian Service Award in 1962. In 1967, she was one of the six recipients of the Federal Woman's Award, presented by Lyndon B. Johnson. That same year, Mills College presented Shipp with an honorary Doctor of Law degree.

Shipp held at least six patents, on chemicals or processes of preparing chemicals, including "Preparation of 2, 4, 6-trinitrobenzyl halides" (1966), hexanitrostilbene (1970) and polynitrobenzophenone (1971, with her colleague Lloyd A. Kaplan).

== Personal life ==
Kathryn Grove married fellow chemist Joseph Harrel Shipp in 1932. They had four children together before they divorced. She died from a heart attack on October 14, 1977, aged 73 years, in Tiburon, California.
