= Webster's test =

Urine test

- Purpose: detect presence of trinitrotoluene

The Webster's test is a qualitative urine test used to detect the presence of trinitrotoluene and its metabolites. The test was developed in 1917 by T. A. Webster in London as a way to test for trinitrotoluene poisoning. A positive test results in a purple color for the acidified urine samples.
