= Ethylenedinitramine =

Names
- IUPAC name N,N′-Dinitro-1,2-ethanediamine
- Other names Haleite; Dinitroethylene diamine; EDNA

Identifiers
CAS Number	505-71-5
3D model (JSmol)	Interactive image
ChemSpider	10030
ECHA InfoCard	100.007.290
PubChem CID	10462
UNII	O5GD93K6WK
CompTox Dashboard (EPA)	DTXSID3052141
- InChI: InChI=1S/C2H6N4O4/c7-5(8)3-1-2-4-6(9)10/h3-4H,1-2H2 Key: QCOXCILKVHKOGO-UHFFFAOYSA-N
- SMILES: C(CN[N+](=O)[O-])N[N+](=O)[O-]

Properties
Chemical formula	C_{2}H_{6}N_{4}O_{4}
Molar mass	150.094 g·mol^{−1}
Appearance	colorless crystals
Density	1,71 g·cm^{−3}
Melting point	177 °C
Solubility in water	slightly soluble

Hazards
- GHS labelling
Pictograms	(GHS07: Exclamation mark)
Signal word	Warning
Hazard statements	H302
Precautionary statements	P264, P270, P301+P312, P330, P501
Autoignition temperature	180 °C
- Except where otherwise noted, data are given for materials in their standard state (at 25 °C [77 °F], 100 kPa). Infobox references

Ethylenedinitramine (EDNA, also Haleite or Explosive H) is an explosive chemical compound of the nitroamine class, a derivative of the ethylenediamine. EDNA is a powerful explosive, with a detonation velocity of 7,570 m/s, slightly higher than that of other common explosive materials, such as TNT (6,900 m/s) or picric acid (7,350 m/s), but lower than RDX (8,750 m/s) or PETN (8,400 m/s).

Ednatol is a high explosive comprising about 58% ethylenedinitramine and 42% TNT.
