= Styphnic acid =

- Styphnic acid

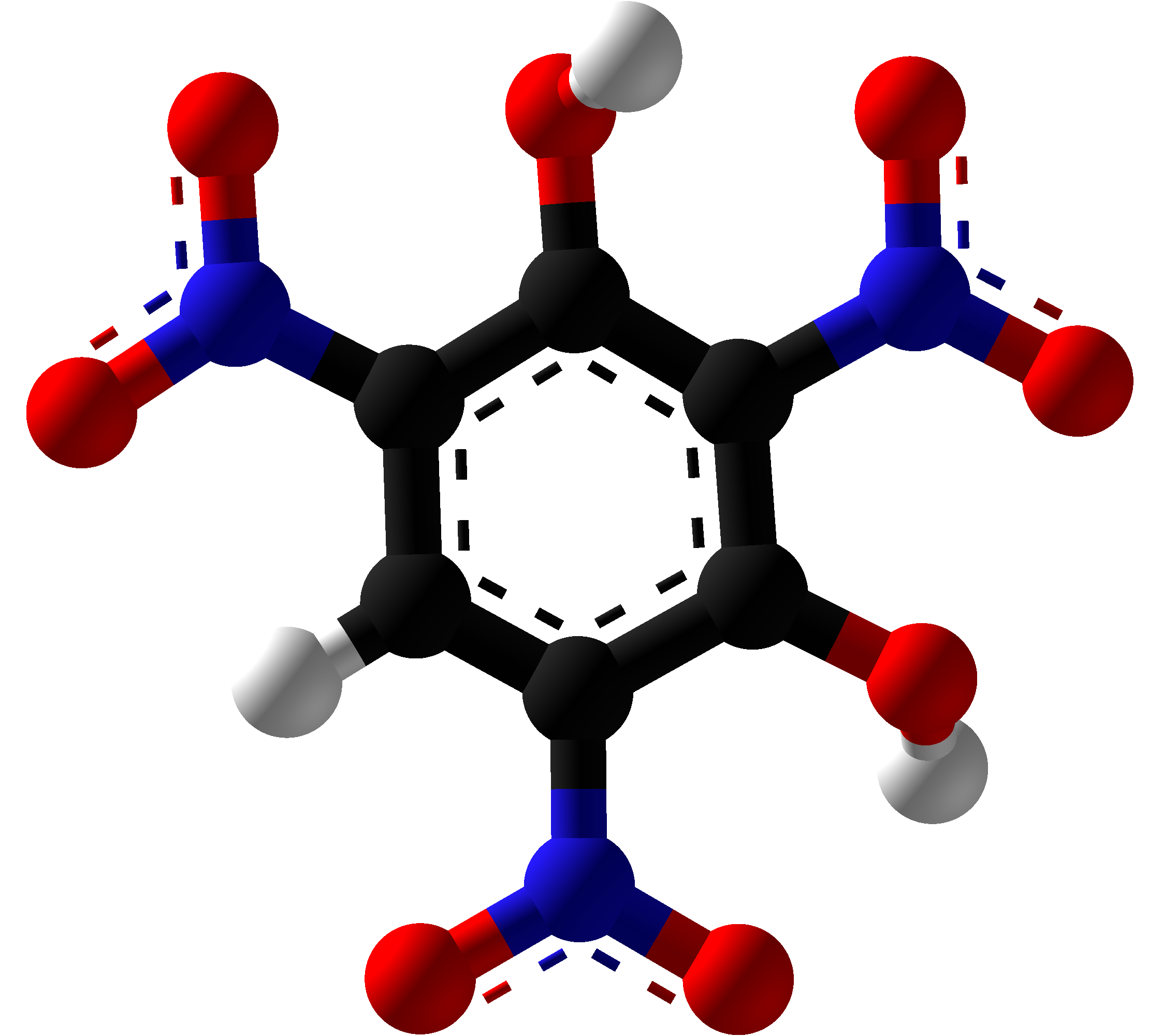

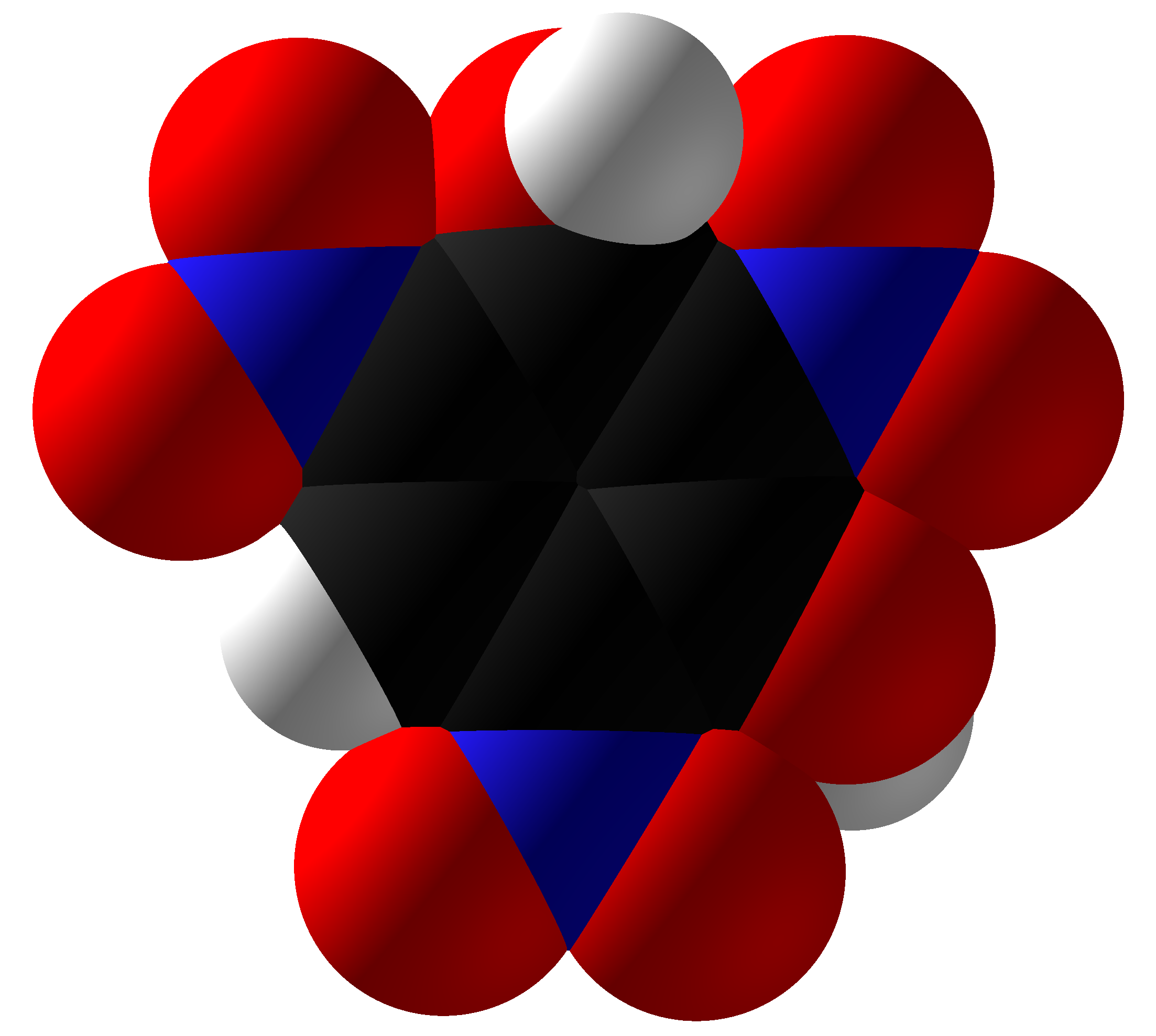

Names
- Preferred IUPAC name 2,4,6-Trinitrobenzene-1,3-diol

Identifiers
CAS Number	82-71-3
3D model (JSmol)	Interactive image
ChemSpider	6465
ECHA InfoCard	100.001.306
PubChem CID	6721
UNII	R4TJB1U00D
UN number	0219 – Dry or wetted with < 20% water/alcohol 0394 – Wetted with >= 20% water/alcohol
CompTox Dashboard (EPA)	DTXSID7058880
- InChI: InChI=1S/C6H3N3O8/c10-5-2(7(12)13)1-3(8(14)15)6(11)4(5)9(16)17/h1,10-11H Key: IXHMHWIBCIYOAZ-UHFFFAOYSA-N; InChI=1/C6H3N3O8/c10-5-2(7(12)13)1-3(8(14)15)6(11)4(5)9(16)17/h1,10-11H Key: IXHMHWIBCIYOAZ-UHFFFAOYAQ
- SMILES: c1c(c(c(c(c1[N+](=O)[O-])O)[N+](=O)[O-])O)[N+](=O)[O-]

Properties
Chemical formula	C_{6}H_{3}N_{3}O_{8}
Molar mass	245.11 g/mol
Density	1.829 g/cm^{3}
Melting point	180 °C (356 °F; 453 K)
Boiling point	decomposes
- Except where otherwise noted, data are given for materials in their standard state (at 25 °C [77 °F], 100 kPa). verify (what is ?) Infobox references

Styphnic acid (from Greek stryphnos "astringent"), or 2,4,6-trinitro-1,3-benzenediol, is a yellow astringent acid that forms hexagonal crystals. It is used in the manufacture of dyes, pigments, inks, medicines, and explosives such as lead styphnate. It is itself a low-sensitivity explosive, similar to picric acid, but explodes upon rapid heating.

== History ==
It was discovered in 1808 by Michel Eugène Chevreul who was researching ways of producing colorants from tropical logwoods. Upon boiling Pernambuco wood extract with nitric acid he filtered crystals understood to be styphnic acid in an impure form. In mid-1840s chemists purified and systematically studied the substance with Rudolf Christian Böttger and Heinrich Will giving its modern name, while in 1871 J. Schreder proved that it is trinitroresorcinol.

== Preparation and chemistry ==
It may be prepared by the nitration of resorcinol with a mixture of nitric and sulfuric acid.

This compound is an example of a trinitrophenol.

Like picric acid, it is a moderately strong acid, capable of displacing carbon dioxide from solutions of sodium carbonate, for example.

It may be reacted with weakly basic oxides, such as those of lead and silver, to form the corresponding salts.

The solubility of picric acid and styphnic acid in water is less than their corresponding mono- and di-nitro compounds, and far less than their non-nitrated precursor phenols, so they may be purified by fractional crystallisation.
