= The Bookman =

The Bookman may refer to:

- The Bookman (London), a monthly magazine 1891–1934
- The Bookman (New York City), a literary journal 1895–1933
