= Oswald Silberrad =

British chemist

Oswald J. Silberrad (1878 – 17 June 1960) was a British chemist who specialised in explosives, the related field of dye stuffs, and metallurgy.

== Life and works ==
Silberrad was born at Buckhurst Hill in Essex and was the younger brother of the writer Una Lucy Silberrad. He studied chemistry at the City and Guilds Technical College. From 1898 to 1900 he attended the University of Würzburg. On leaving Würzburg he worked at various positions until he joined the United Kingdom Government Explosives Committee. This committee had been set up after the Boer War to investigate the shortcomings of British explosives. In 1901, at the age of 23, Silberrad was appointed chemist to the committee. Later he took the position as head of the committee’s research institute at Woolwich. One of his contributions was to bring TNT into use as an explosive for Royal Navy ordnance, thus following a practice that was already well known in Germany.

In 1906 he left the institute, and in 1907 founded the Silberrad Research Laboratories, first at 22 Stag Lane, Buckhurst Hill, and later moved to Loughton, where he had a special laboratory block added to his new house. As a consulting chemist, he mainly focused on the study of explosives. He also developed a new alloy, solving the problem of the erosion of warships' bronze propellers. In 1921 he campaigned unsuccessfully for a position at the Royal Society.

Silberrad is buried at the parish church in Loughton. His home, Dryad's Hall, became that of barrister John Silberrad, and, on his death, was sold out of the family in 2005.

The Silberrad Archive, consisting of 176 boxes, is part of the Science Museum Collections, contains collection of papers relating to the work of Silberrad and the Silberrad Research Laboratories. The Archive includes personal and financial records, correspondence, patent material and reports relating to chemical research generally and to explosives and dyes in particular. Research and cataloguing by National Cataloguing Unit for the Archives of Contemporary Scientists (NCUACS) the extent and the range of Silberrad's work over more than fifty years fully appreciated.

References

- National Cataloguing Unit for the Archives of Contemporary Scientists. Oswald Silberrad. University of Bath.
- Sharp, Robert."Oswald Silberrad: The Work of a Forgotten Chemist". Ambix (50/3) 2003:302-309.
