= Phlegmatizer =

A phlegmatizer is a compound that minimizes the explosive tendency of another compound or material. The term is derived from the word phlegmatic, meaning 'not easily excited'. Many chemical compounds that are potentially explosive have useful non-explosive applications. One large family of phlegmatizers are phthalate esters, which are used as solvents to minimize the explosive tendency of organic peroxides, such as dibenzoyl peroxide and MEKP, which are widely used initiators for polymerizations.

== See also ==
- Phlegmatized explosive
