= Octol =

High-explosive mixture of HMX and TNT

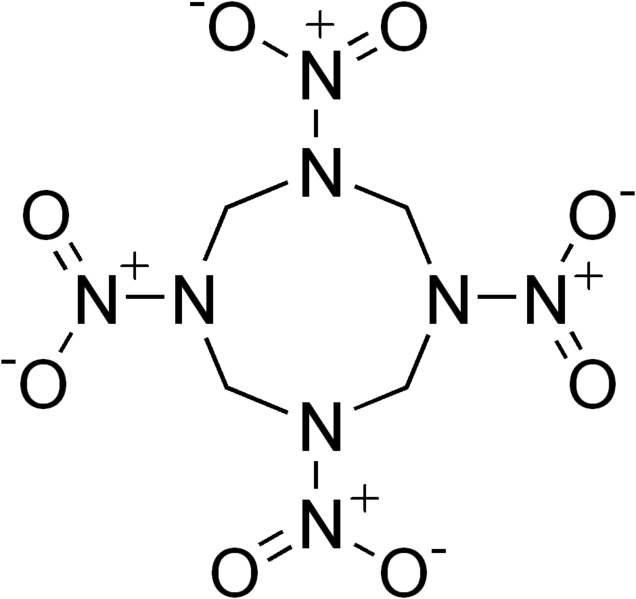
HMX

TNT

Octol is a melt-castable, high explosive mixture consisting of HMX and TNT in different weight proportions.

== Composition ==
Two formulations are commonly used:

- 70% HMX & 30% TNT
- 75% HMX & 25% TNT

Given that HMX has a much higher detonation velocity than TNT (over 2,000 metres per second faster) and forms the main part of this explosive blend, the brisance characteristics of Octol can be inferred.

== Applications ==
The applications of Octol are generally military; e.g., shaped charges and warheads that are used in guided missiles and submunitions. Octol is somewhat more expensive than RDX-based explosives, such as Composition B and Cyclotol. The advantage of Octol is that it significantly reduces the size and weight of the explosive charge required. These are important considerations where smart weapons such as guided missiles are concerned. A light (but effective) warhead means a superior power to weight ratio. This in turn results in a higher velocity missile with a longer range and shorter flight time. As a result, the target has less opportunity to recognise and evade the attack.

== Alternative names ==
Octol is also referred to as Oktol, particularly in Eastern Europe.

== Nominal Properties ==
Reported properties:

- Density: 1.80 g/cm³
- Detonation Velocity: 8.55 mm/μsec

== See also ==
- OKFOL, another HMX-based explosive.
- Cyclotol
- RE factor
