= TNT =

Impact-resistant high explosive

2,4,6-Trinitrotoluene

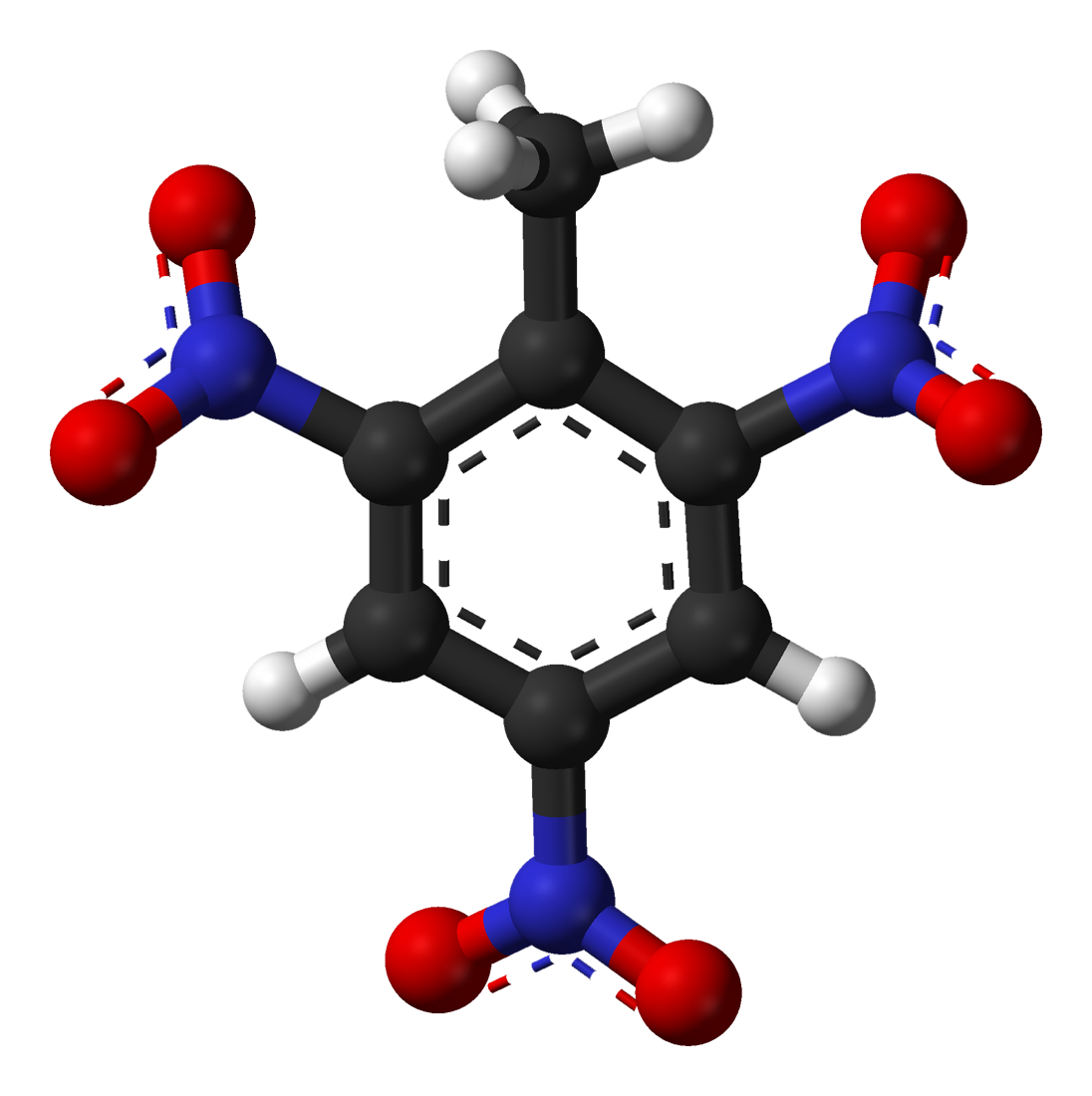

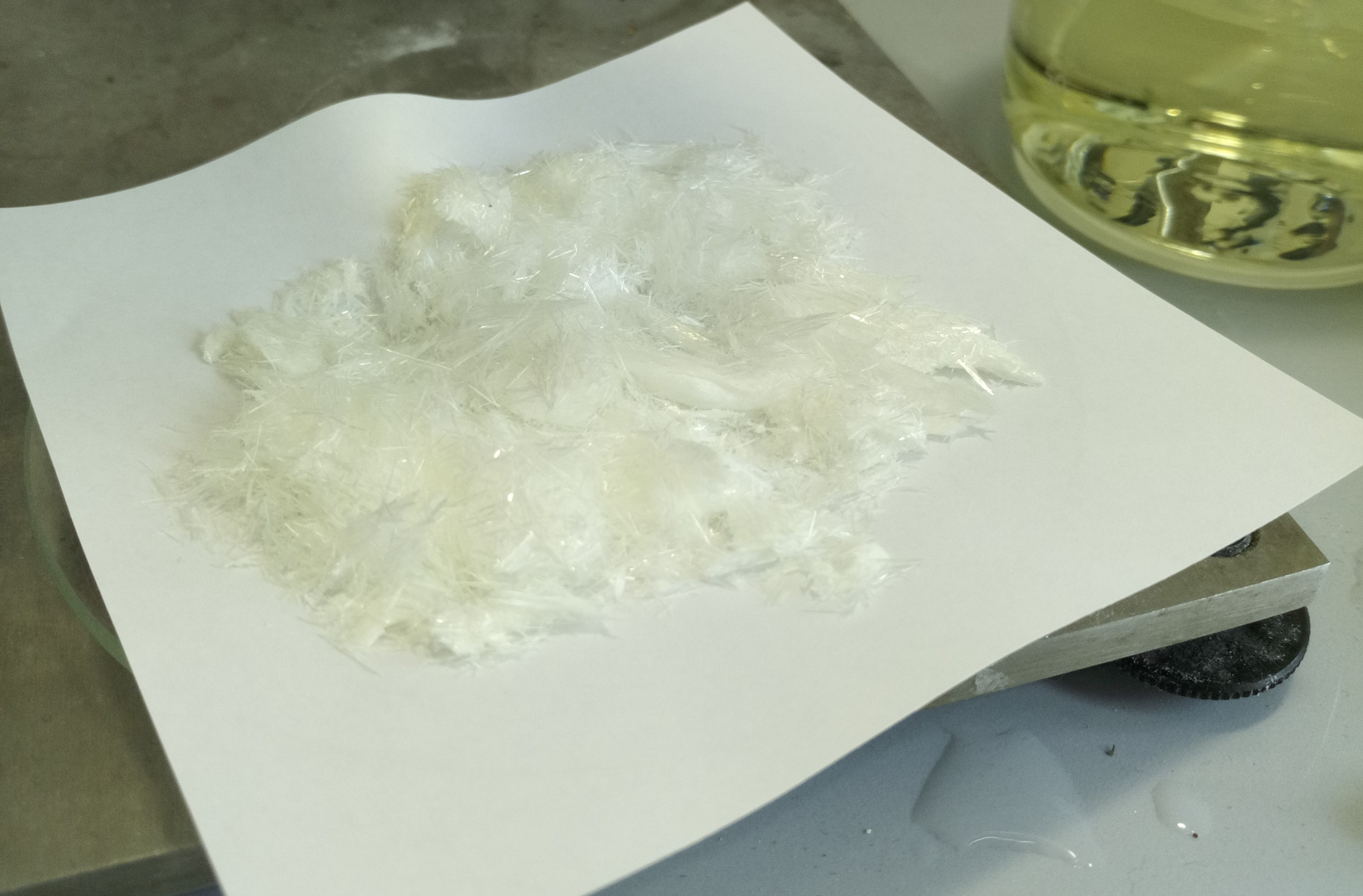

Names
- Preferred IUPAC name 2-Methyl-1,3,5-trinitrobenzene
- Other names: Trinitrotoluene; 2,4,6-Trinitromethylbenzene; 2,4,6-Trinitrotoluol; TNT, Tolite, Trilite, Trinitrotoluol, Trinol, Tritolo, Tritolol, Triton, Tritone, Trotil, Trotol, Trotyl

Identifiers
| CAS Number | 118-96-7 |
| 3D model (JSmol) | Interactive image |
| Abbreviations | TNT |
| ChEMBL | ChEMBL1236345 |
| ChemSpider | 8073 |
| DrugBank | DB01676 |
| ECHA InfoCard | 100.003.900 |
| EC Number | 204-289-6 |
| KEGG | C16391 |
| PubChem CID | 8376 |
| RTECS number | XU0175000 |
| UNII | H43RF5TRM5 |
| UN number | 0209 – Dry or wetted with < 30% water 0388, 0389 – Mixtures with trinitrobenzene, hexanitrostilbene |
| CompTox Dashboard (EPA) | DTXSID7024372 |
- InChI: InChI=1S/C7H5N3O6/c1-4-6(9(13)14)2-5(8(11)12)3-7(4)10(15)16/h2-3H,1H3 Key: SPSSULHKWOKEEL-UHFFFAOYSA-N; InChI=1/C7H5N3O6/c1-4-6(9(13)14)2-5(8(11)12)3-7(4)10(15)16/h2-3H,1H3; InChI=1/C7H5N3O6/c1-4-2-3-5(8(11)12)7(10(15)16)6(4)9(13)14/h2-3H,1H3 Key: FPKOPBFLPLFWAD-UHFFFAOYAR
- SMILES: Cc1c(cc(cc1[N+](=O)[O-])[N+](=O)[O-])[N+](=O)[O-]

Properties
| Chemical formula | C_{7}H_{5}N_{3}O_{6} |
| Molar mass | 227.132 g·mol^{−1} |
| Appearance | Pale yellow solid crystalline needles, flakes or prills |
| Density | 1.654 g/cm^{3} |
| Melting point | 80.35 °C (176.63 °F; 353.50 K) |
| Boiling point | 240.0 °C (464.0 °F; 513.1 K) (decomposes) |
| Solubility in water | 0.13 g/L (20 °C) |
| Solubility in ether, acetone, benzene, pyridine | soluble |
| Vapor pressure | 0.0002 mmHg (20°C) |

Explosive data
| Shock sensitivity | Insensitive |
| Friction sensitivity | Insensitive to 353 N |
| Detonation velocity | 6900 m/s |
| RE factor | 1.00 |

Hazards
- GHS labelling
| Pictograms | (GHS01: Explosive) (GHS06: Toxic) (GHS08: Health hazard) (GHS09: Environmental hazard) |
| Signal word | Danger |
| Hazard statements | H201, H301, H311, H331, H373, H411 |
| Precautionary statements | P210, P273, P309+P311, P370+P380, P373, P501 |
| NFPA 704 (fire diamond) | 2 1 4 |
- Lethal dose or concentration (LD, LC)
| LD_{50} (median dose) | 795 mg/kg (rat, oral); 660 mg/kg (mouse, oral) |
| LD_{Lo} (lowest published) | 500 mg/kg (rabbit, oral); 1850 mg/kg (cat, oral) |
- NIOSH (US health exposure limits)
| PEL (Permissible) | TWA 1.5 mg/m^{3} [skin] |
| REL (Recommended) | TWA 0.5 mg/m^{3} [skin] |
| IDLH (Immediate danger) | 500 mg/m^{3} |
| Safety data sheet (SDS) | ICSC 0967 |

Related compounds
| Related compounds | picric acid hexanitrobenzene 2,4-Dinitrotoluene |
- Except where otherwise noted, data are given for materials in their standard state (at 25 °C [77 °F], 100 kPa). verify (what is ?) Infobox references

Trinitrotoluene spin view

Trinitrotoluene (/ˌtraɪnaɪtroʊˈtɒljuiːn, traɪˌnaɪ-/ TRY-ny-troh-TOL-yoo-een, try-NY-), more commonly known as TNT (and more specifically 2,4,6-trinitrotoluene, and by its preferred IUPAC name 2-methyl-1,3,5-trinitrobenzene), is a chemical compound with the formula C_{6}H_{2}(NO_{2})_{3}CH_{3}. TNT is occasionally used as a reagent in chemical synthesis, but it is best known as an explosive material with convenient handling properties. The explosive yield of TNT is a standard comparative convention of bombs and asteroid impacts. In chemistry, TNT is used to generate charge transfer salts. TNT has contaminated ecosystems, and been found in fish.

== History ==
TNT was first synthesized in 1863 by German chemist Julius Wilbrand and was originally used as a yellow dye. Its potential as an explosive was not recognized for three decades, mainly because it was so much less sensitive than other explosives known at the time. Its explosive properties were discovered in 1891 by another German chemist, Carl Häussermann. TNT can be safely poured when liquid into shell cases, and is so insensitive that in 1910 it was exempted from the UK's Explosives Act 1875 and was not considered an explosive for the purposes of manufacture and storage.

The German armed forces adopted it as a filling for artillery shells in 1902. TNT-filled armour-piercing shells would explode after they had penetrated the armour of British capital ships, whereas the British Lyddite-filled shells tended to explode upon striking armour, thus expending much of their energy outside the ship. The British started replacing Lyddite with TNT in 1907.

The United States Navy continued filling armour-piercing shells with explosive D after some other nations had switched to TNT, but began filling naval mines, bombs, depth charges, and torpedo warheads with burster charges of crude grade B TNT with the color of brown sugar and requiring an explosive booster charge of granular crystallized grade A TNT for detonation. High-explosive shells were filled with grade A TNT, which became preferred for other uses as industrial chemical capacity became available for removing xylene and similar hydrocarbons from the toluene feedstock and other nitrotoluene isomer byproducts from the nitrating reactions.

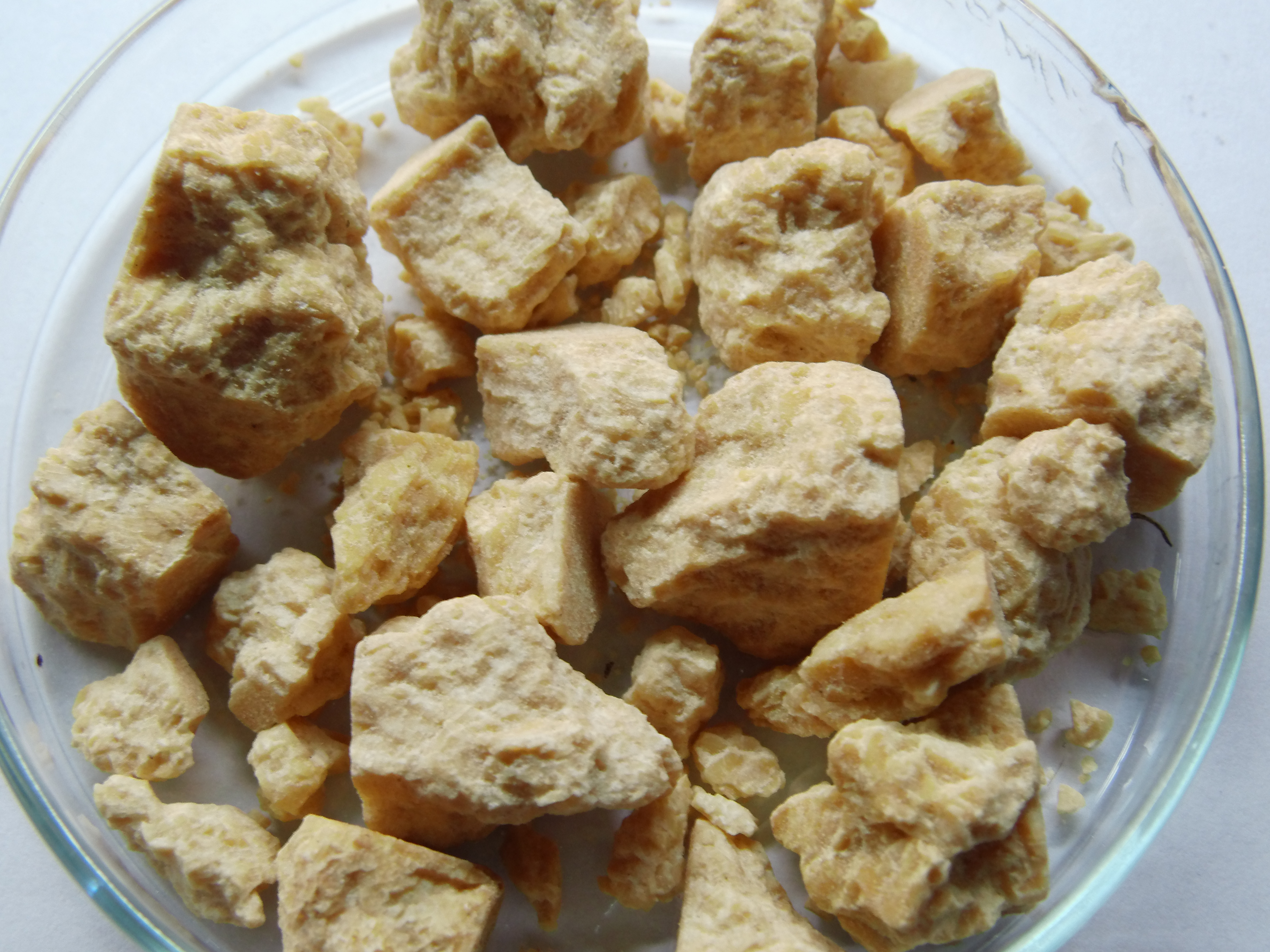
Chunks of explosives-grade TNT

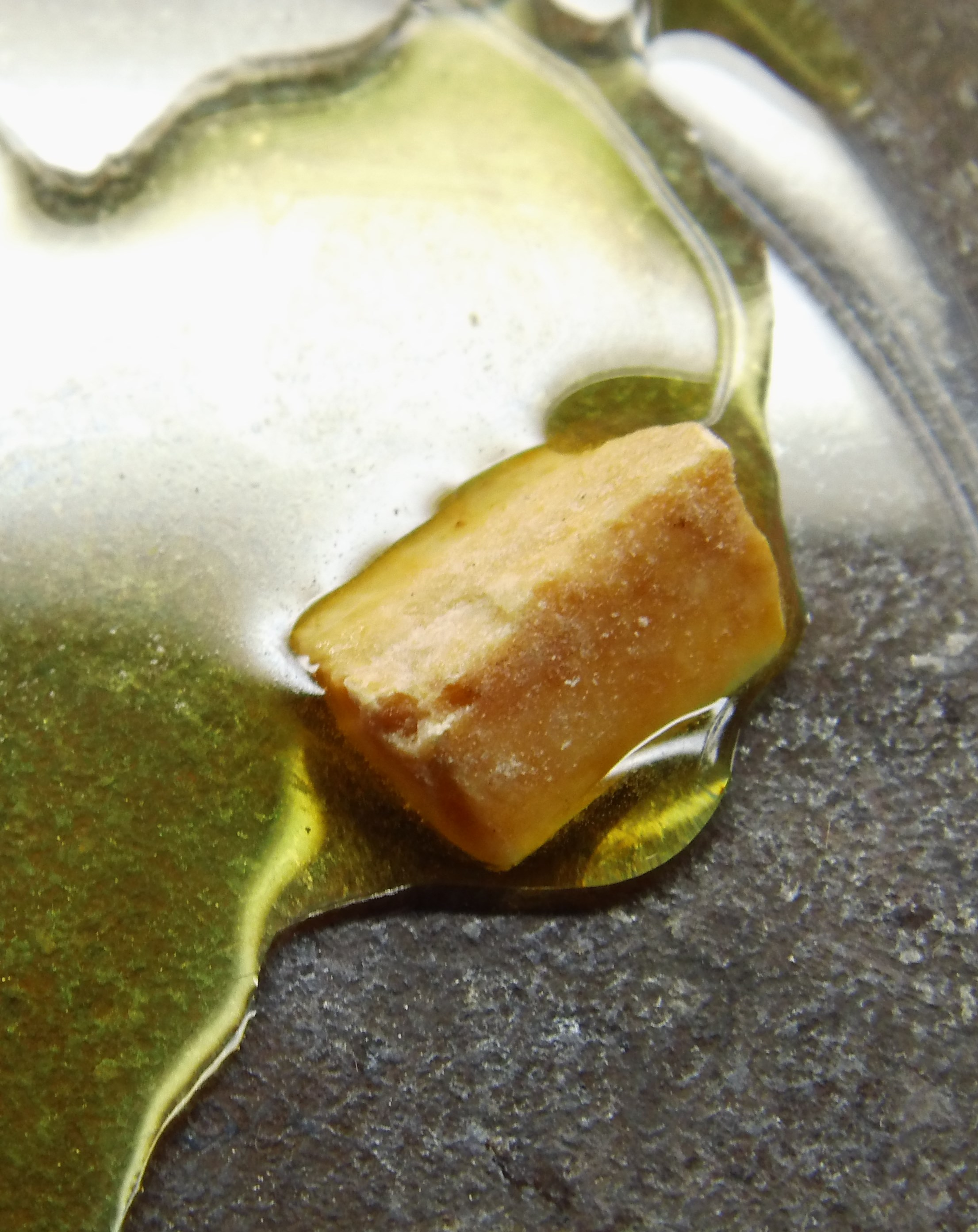
Trinitrotoluene melting at 81 °C (178 °F)

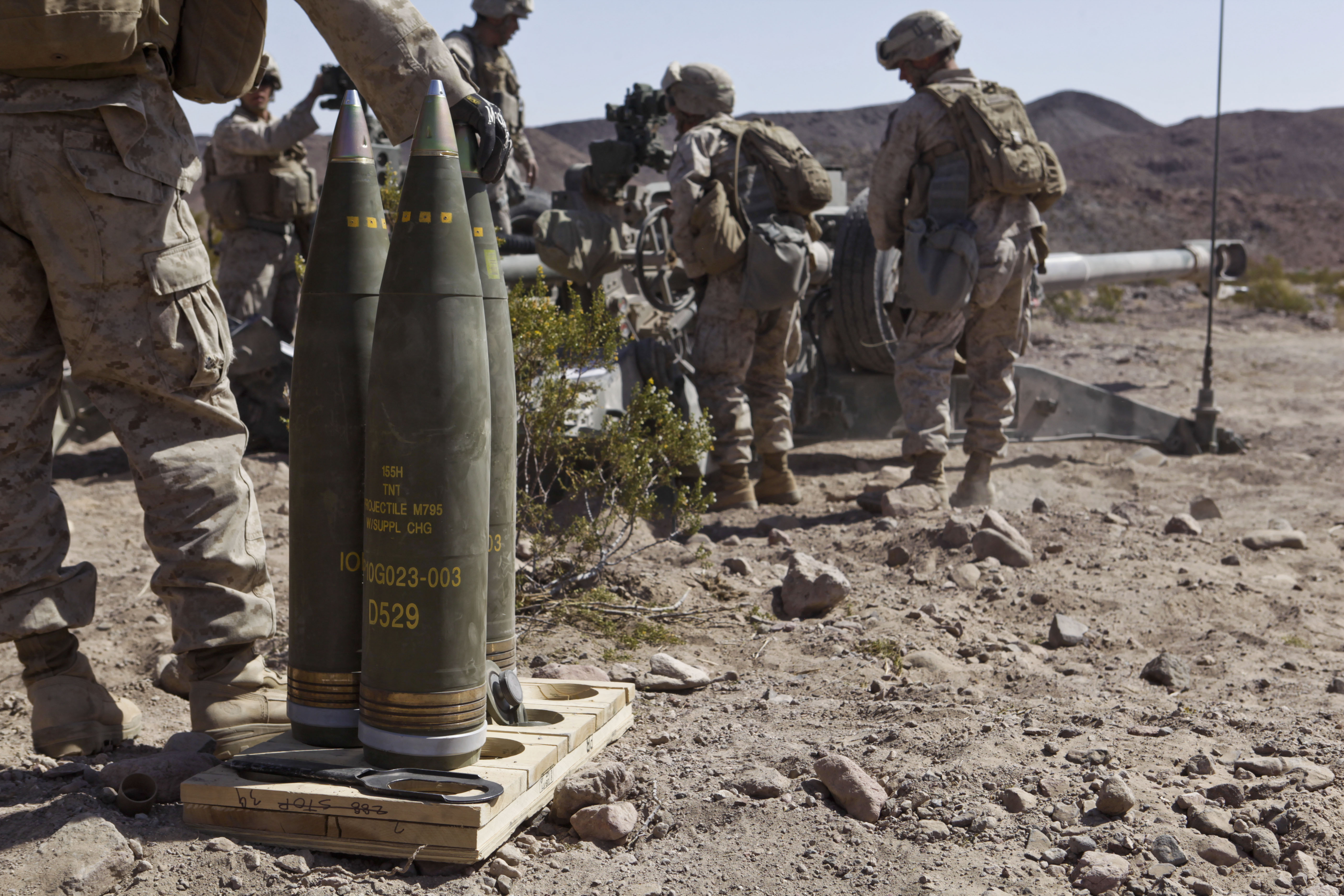
M795 artillery shells with fuzes fitted, labelled to indicate a filling of TNT

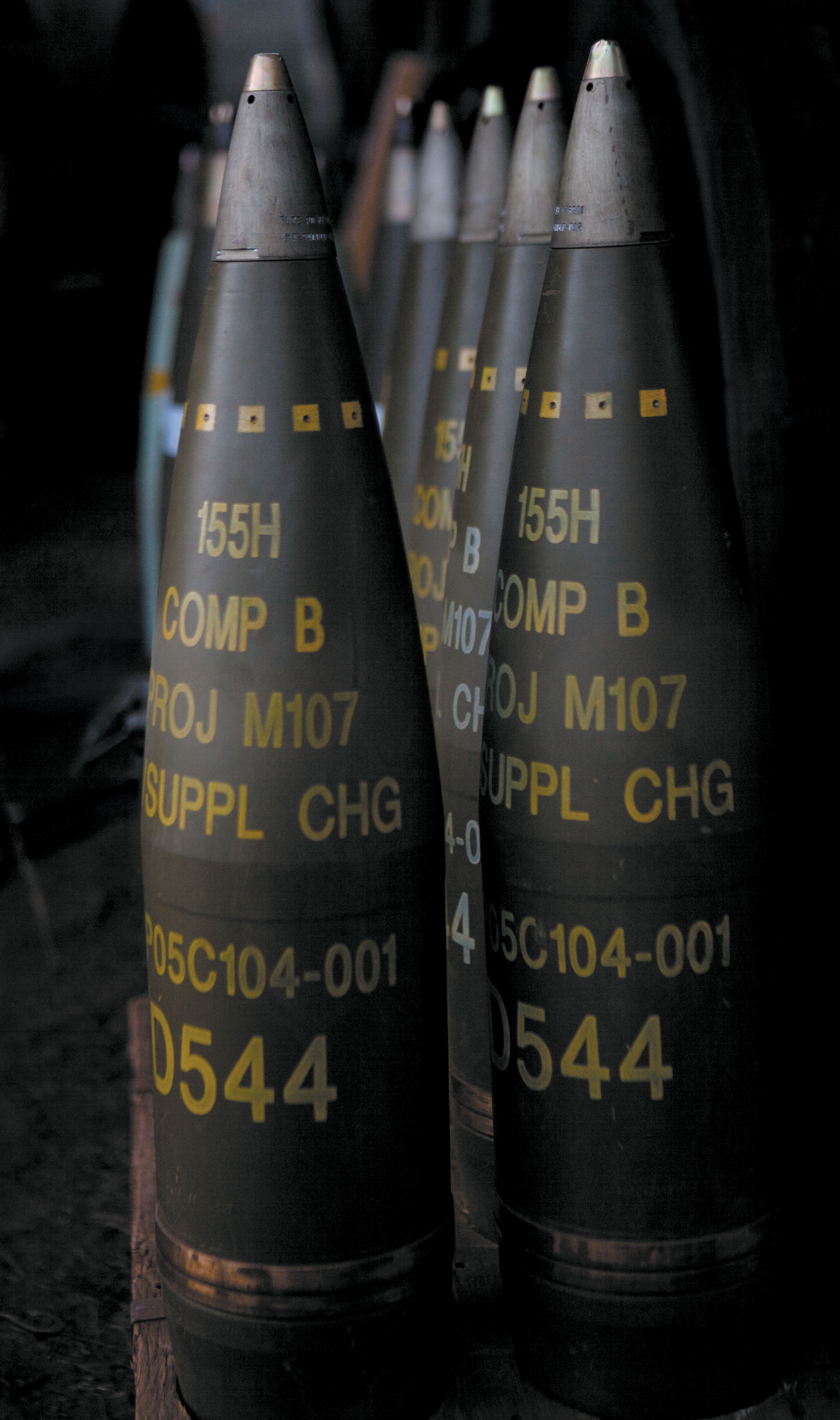
M107 artillery shells. All are labelled to indicate a filling of "Comp B" (mixture of TNT and RDX) and have fuzes fitted

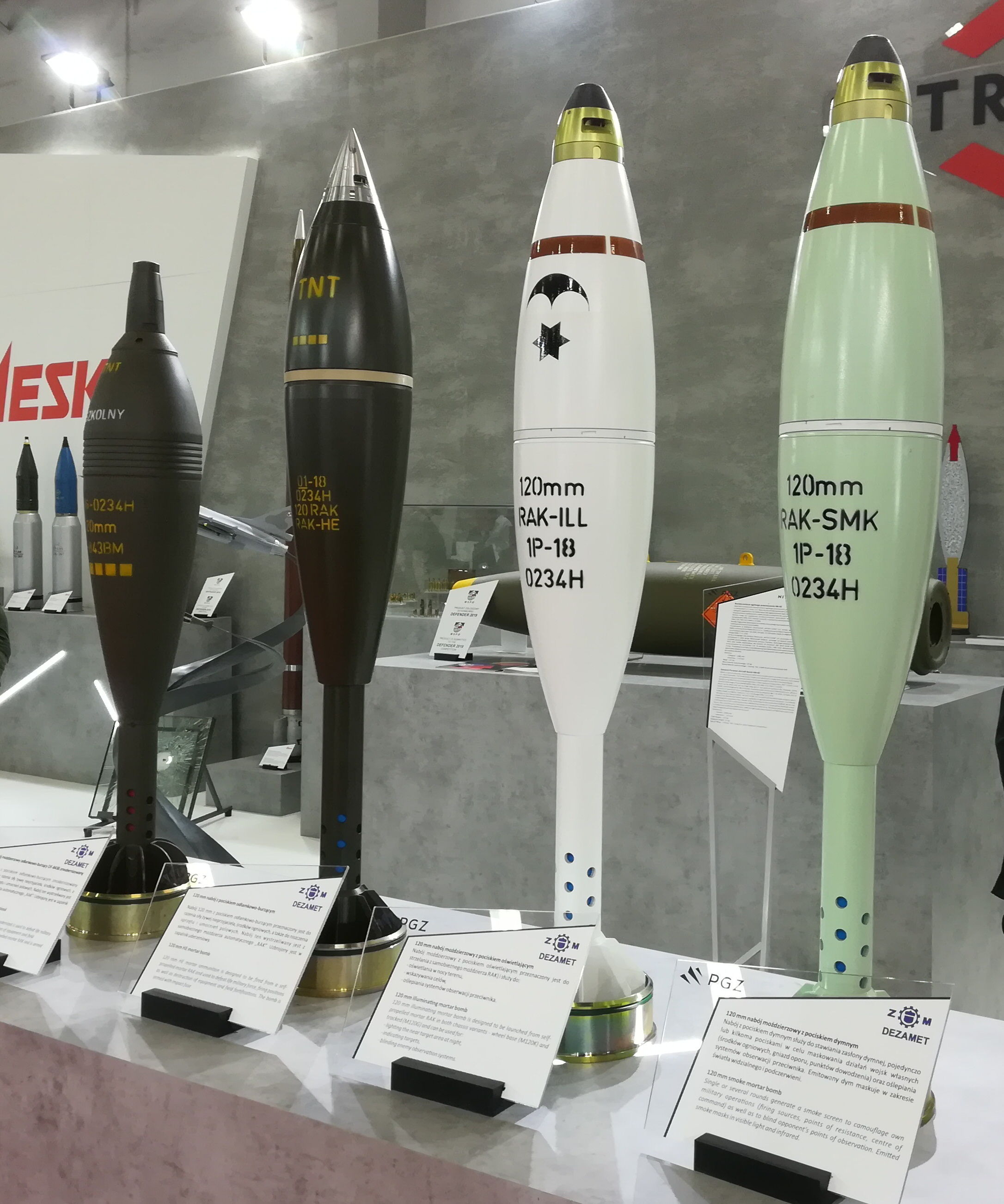
A group of M120 Rak mortar shells. The dark green shells on the left are stencilled to indicate a filling of TNT

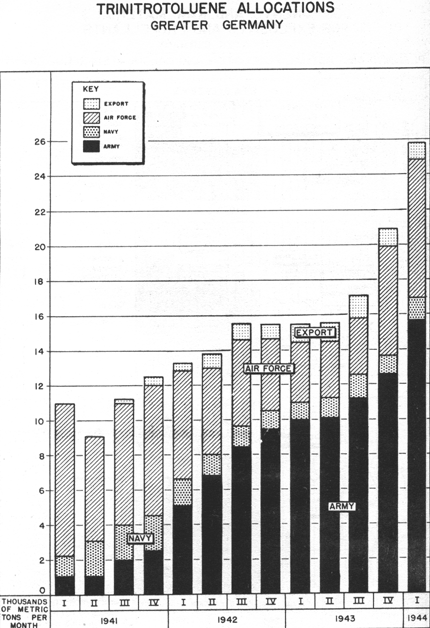
Analysis of TNT production by branch of the German armed forces between 1941 and the first quarter of 1944, shown in thousands of tons per month

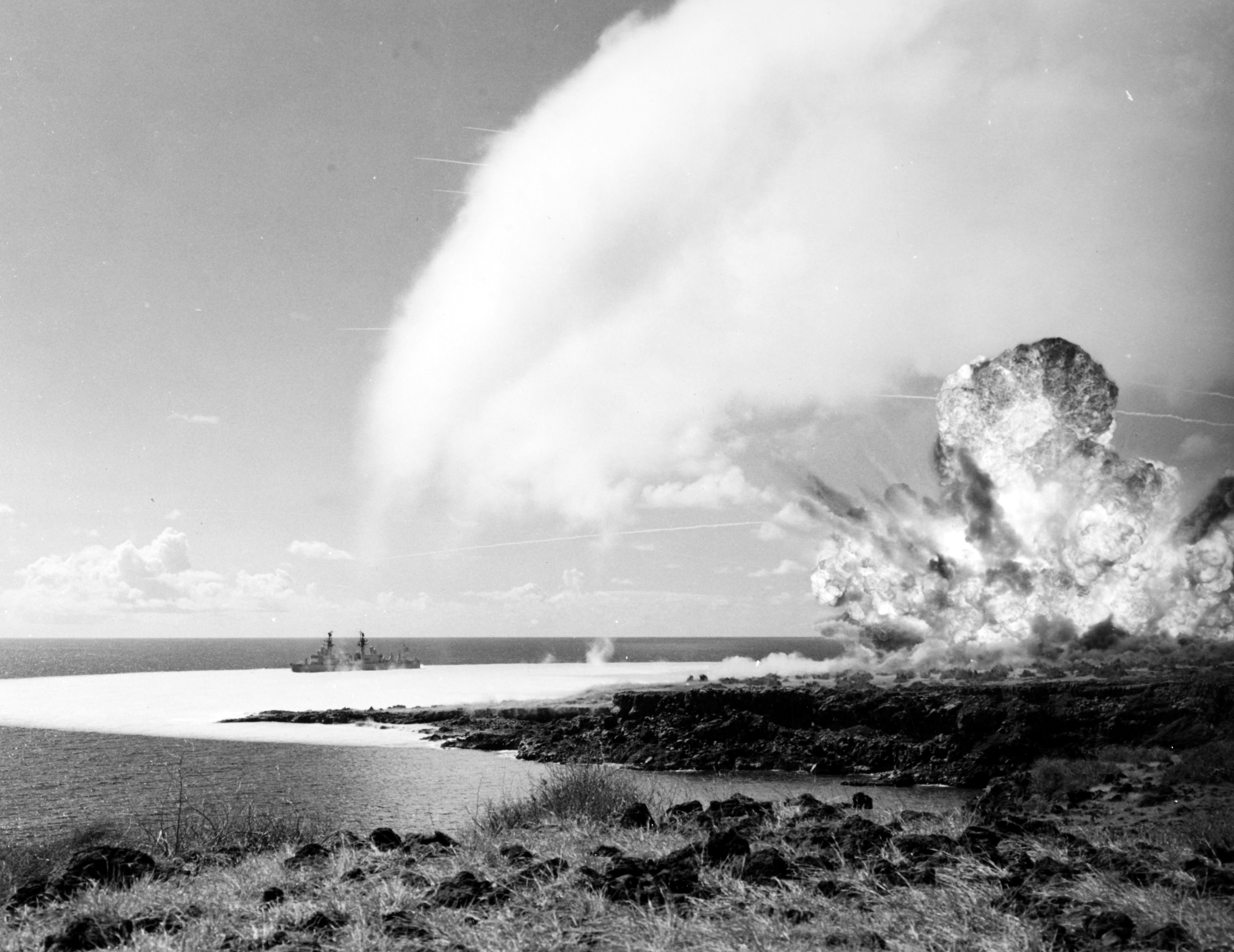
Detonation of the 500-ton TNT explosive charge as part of Operation Sailor Hat in 1965. The passing blast-wave left a white water surface behind and a white condensation cloud is visible overhead.

== Preparation ==
In industry, TNT is produced in a three-step process. First, toluene is nitrated with a mixture of sulfuric and nitric acid to produce mononitrotoluene (MNT). The MNT is separated and then renitrated to dinitrotoluene (DNT). In the final step, the DNT is nitrated to trinitrotoluene (TNT) using an anhydrous mixture of nitric acid and fuming sulfuric acid (oleum). Nitric acid is consumed by the manufacturing process, but the diluted sulfuric acid can be reconcentrated and reused.

After nitration, TNT can either be purified by crystallization from an organic solvent or stabilized by a process called sulfitation, where the crude TNT is treated with aqueous sodium sulfite solution to remove less stable isomers of TNT and other undesired reaction products. The rinse water from sulfitation is known as red water and is a significant pollutant and waste product of TNT manufacture.

Control of nitrogen oxides in feed nitric acid is very important because free nitrogen dioxide can result in oxidation of the methyl group of toluene. This reaction is highly exothermic and carries with it the risk of a runaway reaction leading to an explosion.

In the laboratory, 2,4,6-trinitrotoluene is produced by a two-step process. A nitrating mixture of concentrated nitric and sulfuric acids is used to nitrate toluene to a mixture of mono- and di-nitrotoluene isomers, with careful cooling to maintain temperature. The nitrated toluenes are then separated, washed with dilute sodium bicarbonate to remove oxides of nitrogen, and then carefully nitrated with a mixture of fuming nitric acid and sulfuric acid.

X-ray crystallography has determined the structure of two polymorphic forms of TNT. In each structure, the three planar nitro groups are rotated out of the plane of the benzene ring.

== Applications ==
TNT is one of the most commonly used explosives for military, industrial, and mining applications. TNT has been used in oil and gas fracking (hydraulic fracturing) in shale formations. The technique involves displacing and detonating nitroglycerin in hydraulically induced fractures followed by wellbore shots using pelletized TNT.

TNT is valued partly because of its insensitivity to shock and friction, with reduced risk of accidental detonation compared to more sensitive explosives such as nitroglycerin. TNT melts at 80 °C (176 °F), far below the temperature at which it will spontaneously detonate, allowing it to be poured or safely combined with other explosives. TNT neither absorbs nor dissolves in water, which allows it to be used effectively in wet environments. To detonate, TNT must be triggered by a pressure wave from a starter explosive, called an explosive booster.

Although blocks of TNT are available in various sizes (e.g., 250 g, 500 g, 1,000 g), it is more commonly encountered in synergistic explosive blends comprising a variable percentage of TNT plus other ingredients. Examples of explosive blends containing TNT include:

- Amatex (ammonium nitrate and RDX)
- Amatol (ammonium nitrate)
- Baratol (67% barium nitrate and 33% TNT)
- Composition B (RDX and paraffin wax)
- Composition H6
- Cyclotol (RDX)
- Ednatol
- Hexanite (hexanitrodiphenylamine)
- Minol (40% TNT, 40% ammonium nitrate, 20% aluminium)
- Octol (75% HMX and 25% TNT)
- Pentolite
- Picratol
- Tetrytol
- Torpex
- Tritonal

== Explosive character ==
Upon detonation, TNT undergoes a decomposition equivalent to the reaction

2 C_{7}H_{5}N_{3}O_{6} → 3 N_{2} + 5 H_{2}O + 7 CO + 7 C

plus some of the reactions

H_{2} + CO → H_{2}O + C

and

2 CO → CO_{2} + C.

The reaction is exothermic but has a high activation energy in the gas phase (~62 kcal/mol). The condensed phases (solid or liquid) show markedly lower activation energies of roughly 35 kcal/mol due to unique bimolecular decomposition routes at elevated densities. Because of the production of carbon, TNT explosions have a sooty appearance. Because TNT has an excess of carbon, explosive mixtures with oxygen-rich compounds can yield more energy per kilogram than TNT alone. During the 20th century amatol, a mixture of TNT with ammonium nitrate, was a widely used military explosive.

TNT can be detonated with a high velocity initiator or by efficient concussion. For many years, TNT used to be the reference point for the Figure of insensitivity. TNT had a rating of exactly 100 on the "F of I" scale. The reference has since been changed to a more sensitive explosive called RDX, which has an F of I rating of 80.

== Energy content ==
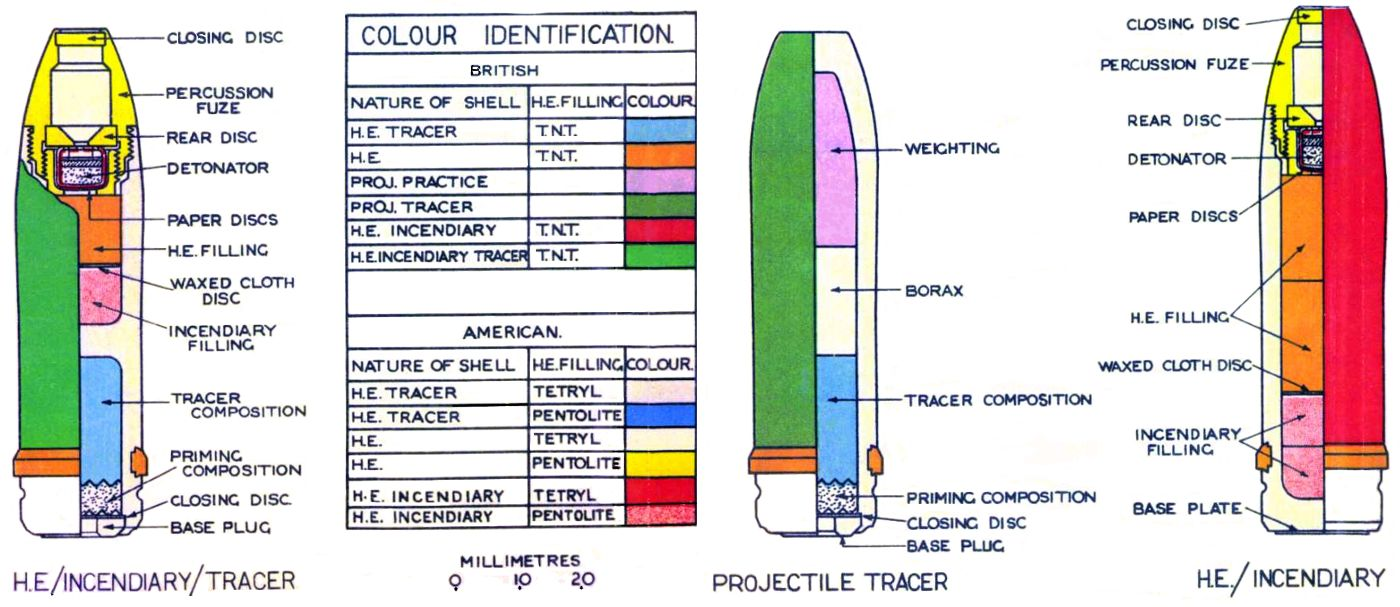
Cross-sectional view of Oerlikon 20 mm cannon shells (dating from c. 1945) showing color codes for TNT and pentolite fillings

The energy density of TNT is used as a reference point for many other explosives, including nuclear weapons, as their energy content is measured in equivalent tonnes (metric tons, t) of TNT. The energy used by NIST to define the equivalent is 4.184 GJ/t or exactly 1 kcal/g.

For safety assessments, it has been stated that the detonation of TNT, depending on circumstances, can release 2.673–6.702 GJ/t.

The heat of combustion however is 14.5 GJ/t (14.5 MJ/kg or 4.027 kWh/kg), which requires that the carbon in TNT fully react with atmospheric oxygen, which does not occur in the initial event.

For comparison, gunpowder contains 3 MJ/kg, dynamite contains 7.5 MJ/kg, and gasoline contains 47.2 MJ/kg (though gasoline requires an oxidant, so an optimized gasoline and O_{2} mixture contains 10.4 MJ/kg).

== Detection ==
Various methods can be used to detect TNT, including optical and electrochemical sensors and explosive-sniffing dogs. In 2013, researchers from the Indian Institutes of Technology using noble-metal quantum clusters could detect TNT at the sub-zeptomolar (10^{−18} mol/m^{3}) level.

== Safety and toxicity ==
TNT is poisonous, and skin contact can cause skin irritation, causing the skin to turn a bright yellow-orange color. During the First World War, female munition workers who handled the chemical found that their skin turned bright yellow, which resulted in their acquiring the nickname "canary girls" or simply "canaries".

People exposed to TNT over a prolonged period tend to experience anemia and abnormal liver functions. Blood and liver effects, spleen enlargement and other harmful effects on the immune system have also been found in animals that ingested or breathed trinitrotoluene. There is evidence that TNT adversely affects male fertility. TNT is listed as a possible human carcinogen, with carcinogenic effects demonstrated in animal experiments with rats, although effects upon humans so far amount to none (according to IRIS of March 15, 2000). Consumption of TNT produces red urine through the presence of breakdown products and not blood as sometimes believed.

Some military testing grounds are contaminated with wastewater from munitions programs, including contamination of surface and subsurface waters which may be colored pink because of the presence of TNT. Such contamination, called "pink water", may be difficult and expensive to remedy.

TNT is prone to exudation of dinitrotoluenes and other isomers of trinitrotoluene when projectiles containing TNT are stored at higher temperatures in warmer climates. Exudation of impurities leads to formation of pores and cracks (which in turn cause increased shock sensitivity). Migration of the exudated liquid into the fuze screw thread can form fire channels, increasing the risk of accidental detonation. Fuze malfunction can also result from the liquid migrating into the fuze mechanism. Calcium silicate is mixed with TNT to mitigate the tendency towards exudation.

=== Pink and red water ===
Pink water is wastewater saturated with trinitrotoluene (at a concentration of up to 150 ppm). Pink water may be produced from equipment washing processes following munitions filling or demilitarization operations. Due to variances in the methods used at different production sites, pink water's composition is indefinite, and depends on the exact process used at a particular site; the runoff from a munitions factory may also contain RDX or HMX, depending on the mix used.

Red water is wastewater formed when crude trinitrotoluene is reacted with an aqueous sodium sulfite solution (referred to as "sellite"). Sellite reacts with the undesired components to form water-soluble compounds, but leaves the desired isomer unchanged. The water used to wash these now-soluble waste compounds away is referred to as red water, or sometimes "sellite water" It has a complex composition containing more than a dozen aromatic compounds, but the principal components are inorganic salts (sodium sulfate, sodium sulfite, sodium nitrite and sodium nitrate) and sulfonated nitroaromatics.

Pink and red water are colorless at the time of generation; the color is produced by photolytic reactions under the influence of sunlight. Despite the names, red and pink water are not necessarily different shades; the color depends mainly on the duration of solar exposure. If exposed long enough, "pink" water may turn various shades of pink, red, rusty orange, or black.

Because of the toxicity of TNT, the discharge of pink water to the environment has been prohibited in the US and many other countries for decades, but ground contamination may exist in very old plants. However, RDX and tetryl contamination is usually considered more problematic, as TNT has very low soil mobility. Red water is significantly more toxic and as such it has always been considered hazardous waste. It has traditionally been disposed of by evaporation to dryness (as the toxic components are not volatile), followed by incineration. Much research has been conducted to develop better disposal processes.

== Ecological impact ==
Because of its suitability in munitions, TNTs toxicity has been characterized and reported. Residual TNT from manufacture, storage, and use can pollute water, soil, the atmosphere, and the biosphere.

The concentration of TNT in contaminated soil can reach 50 g/kg of soil, where the highest concentrations can be found on or near the surface. In September 2001, the United States Environmental Protection Agency (USEPA) declared TNT a pollutant whose removal is a priority. The USEPA maintains that TNT levels in soil should not exceed 17.2 milligrams per kilogram of soil and 0.01 milligrams per litre of water.

=== Aqueous solubility ===
Dissolution is a measure of the rate that solid TNT in contact with water is dissolved. The relatively low aqueous solubility of TNT causes solid particles to be continuously released to the environment over extended periods of time. Studies have shown that TNT dissolves more slowly in saline water than in freshwater. However, when salinity is altered, TNT dissolves at the same speed. Because TNT is moderately soluble in water, it can migrate through subsurface soil, and cause groundwater contamination.

=== Soil adsorption ===
TNT and its transformation products are known to adsorb to surface soils and sediments, where they undergo reactive transformation or remained stored. The movement of organic contaminants through soils is a function of their ability to associate with the mobile phase (water) and a stationary phase (soil). Materials that associate strongly with soils move slowly through soil. The association constant for TNT with soil is 2.7 to 11 L/kg of soil. This means that TNT has a one- to tenfold tendency to adhere to soil particulates than not when introduced into the soil. Hydrogen bonding and ion exchange are two suggested mechanisms of adsorption between the nitro functional groups and soil colloids.

The adsorption of TNT is sensitive to soil type wet rain and etc.

Additional studies have shown that the mobility of TNT degradation products is likely to be lower "than TNT in subsurface environments where specific adsorption to clay minerals dominates the sorption process." Thus, the mobility of TNT and its transformation products are dependent on the characteristics of the sorbent. The mobility of TNT in groundwater and soil has been extrapolated from "sorption and desorption isotherm models determined with humic acids, in aquifer sediments, and soils". From these models, it is predicted that TNT has a low retention and transports readily in the environment.

Compared to other explosives, TNT has a higher association constant with soil, meaning it adheres more with soil than with water. Conversely, other explosives, such as RDX and HMX with low association constants (ranging from 0.06 to 7.3 L/kg and 0 to 1.6 L/kg respectively) can move more rapidly in water.

=== Chemical breakdown ===
The transformation of TNT is significantly enhanced under anaerobic conditions as well as under highly reducing conditions. TNT transformations in soils can occur both biologically and abiotically.

=== Biodegradation ===
While some bacteria and fungi can incorporate and transform TNT into various aromatic compounds, bio-mineralization of large amounts of TNT by soil organisms has yet to be reported. Wild and transgenic plants have also demonstrated the ability to phytoremediate TNT by absorption from soil and water. The primary mechanism of degradation within plants is believed to be via the enzyme nitroreductase .

== See also ==
- Dynamite
- Environmental fate of TNT
- IMX-101
- List of explosives used during World War II
- Phlegmatized
- RE factor
- Table of explosive detonation velocities
- TNT equivalent
- Webster's test
