= Explosive =

Substance that can explode

Demonstration of the explosive properties of three different explosives; four explosions are demonstrated. Three are conducted on a solid marble base, and one is conducted on the demonstrator's hand; each is initiated by a splint.

An explosive is a reactive substance that contains a great amount of potential energy that can produce an explosion if released suddenly, usually accompanied by the production of light, heat, sound, and pressure. An explosive charge is a measured quantity of explosive material. The material may either be composed solely of one ingredient or be a mixture containing at least two substances. An explosive can be used together with mechanical or electronic components to manufacture a bomb.

The potential energy can be stored in an explosive material in various ways. Most commonly it is stored as chemical energy, such as gunpowder, TNT, nitroglycerin or even grain dust. It can also be stored as pressurized gas, like a gas cylinder, aerosol can, or boiling liquid expanding vapor explosion, or less commonly as nuclear energy, such as in the fissile isotopes uranium-235 and plutonium-239.

Explosive materials may be categorized by the speed at which they expand. Materials that detonate, in which the front of the chemical reaction moves through the material faster than the speed of sound, are called “high explosives.” In contrast, materials that deflagrate, where the front of the reaction moves slower than the speed of sound, are known as “low explosives.” Generally, outcome of the reaction is a rapid burn rather than a proper explosion as seen with high explosives. Explosives may also be categorized by their sensitivity. Sensitive materials that can be initiated by a relatively small amount of heat or pressure are primary explosives, and materials that are relatively insensitive are secondary or tertiary explosives. Such materials require a detonator to initiate the explosion, without which they will deflagrate instead.

Only some of the manufactured chemicals are suitable to be used as explosives. The remainders are too dangerous, sensitive, toxic, expensive, unstable, or prone to decomposition or degradation over short time spans. In contrast, some materials are merely combustible or flammable if they burn without exploding. The distinction, however, is not always clear. Certain materials—dusts, powders, gases, or volatile organic liquids—may simply be combustible or flammable under ordinary conditions but become explosive in specific situations or forms, such as dispersed airborne clouds, confinement, or sudden release.

== History ==
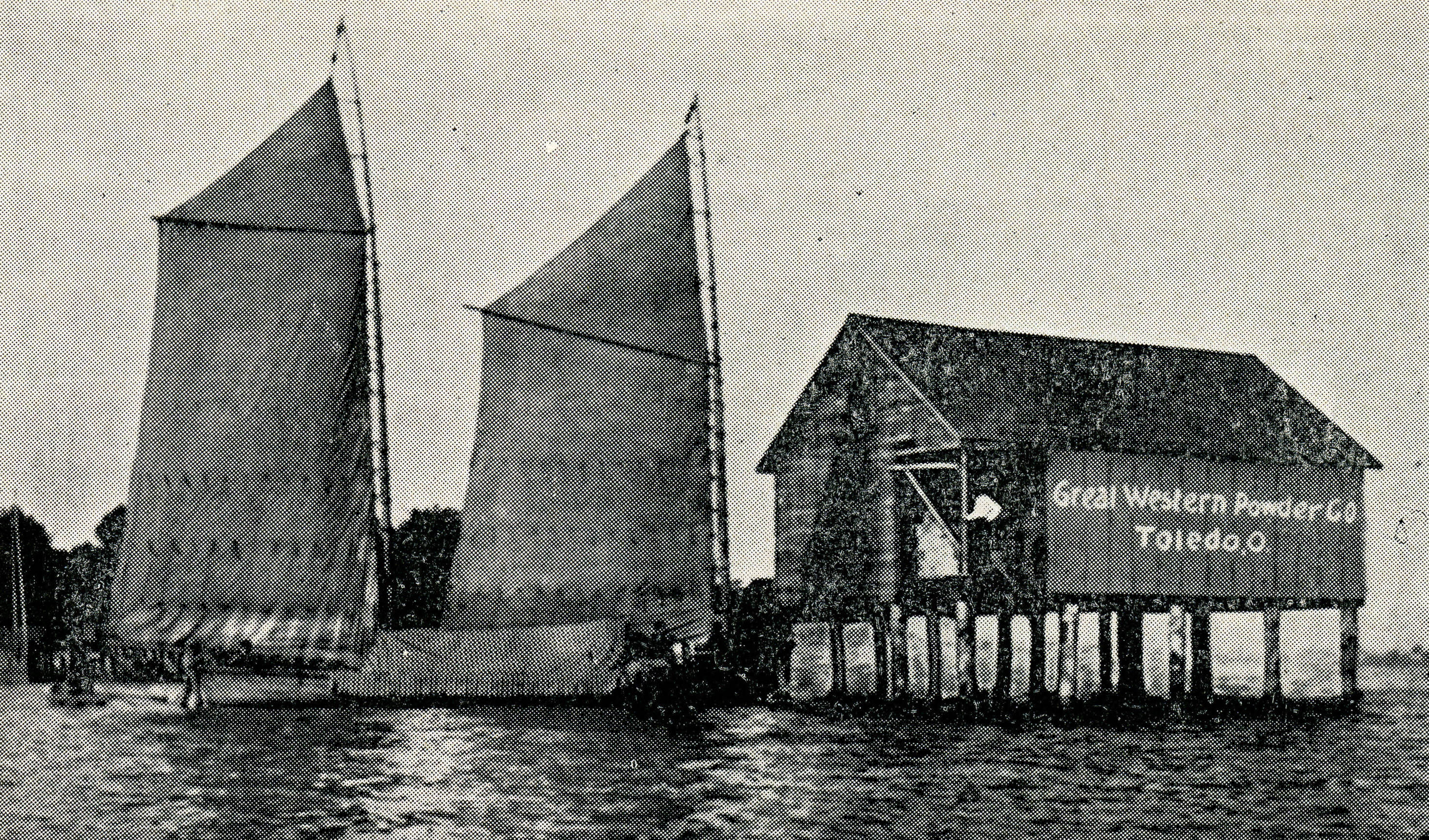
The Great Western Powder Company of Toledo, Ohio, a producer of explosives, seen in 1905

Early thermal weapons, such as Greek fire, have existed since ancient times. The history of chemical explosives is closely intertwined with the history of gunpowder. While searching for an elixir of eternal life, Taoist alchemists in China created the earliest form of gunpowder from coal, saltpeter, and sulfur. Gunpowder was the first form of chemical explosives, first seeing use in warfare in 1161. Early forms of explosives in warfare included bamboo firecrackers, which were explosives fired from bamboo or bronze tubes.

The first explosive stronger than black powder to see widespread use was nitroglycerin, developed in 1847. Since nitroglycerin is a liquid and highly unstable, it was replaced by nitrocellulose and trinitrotoluene (TNT) in 1863, smokeless powder and dynamite in 1867, and gelignite. World War I saw the adoption of TNT in artillery shells, while World War II saw extensive use of new explosives.

In modern weapons, these have largely been replaced by more powerful explosives such as C-4 and pentaerythritol tetranitrate (PETN), which are waterproof and malleable, though they may catch fire due to reactions with metals.

== Applications ==
A stick of dynamite: 1. Diatomaceous earth (or any other type of absorbent material) soaked in nitroglycerin; 2. Protective coating surrounding the explosive material; 3. Blasting cap; 4. Wire connected to the blasting cap

An explosive device typically refers to a bomb that is not used by a military. It contains an explosive with a detonator connected to a triggering mechanism to form a device used for a specific purpose.

== Commercial ==
The largest commercial application of explosives is mining. The detonation or deflagration of either a high or low explosive in a confined space can be used to liberate a fairly specific sub-volume of a brittle material (rock) in a much larger volume of the same or similar material. The mining industry tends to use nitrate-based explosives such as emulsions of fuel oil and ammonium nitrate solutions, mixtures of ammonium nitrate prills (fertilizer pellets), fuel oil (ANFO), and gelatinous suspensions or slurries of ammonium nitrate and combustible fuels.

In materials science and engineering, explosives are used in cladding (explosion welding). This is a solid state (solid-phase) process where welding is accomplished by accelerating one of the components at extremely high velocity through the use of explosives. This process is often used to clad carbon steel or aluminium plate with a thin layer of a harder or more corrosion-resistant material.

A video on safety precautions at blast sites

A video describing how to safely handle explosives in mines

== Classification ==
=== By energy source ===
==== Chemical ====
The international pictogram for explosive substances

An explosion is a type of spontaneous chemical reaction that, once initiated, is driven by both a large exothermic change (Note: great release of heat) and a large positive entropy change (Note: great quantities of gases are released) in going from reactants to products, thereby constituting a thermodynamically favorable process that propagates very rapidly. Thus, explosives are substances that contain a large amount of energy stored in chemical bonds. The energetic stability of the gaseous products, and hence their generation, comes from the formation of strongly bonded species like carbon monoxide, carbon dioxide, and nitrogen gas, which contain strong double and triple bonds having bond strengths of nearly 1 MJ/mole. Consequently, most commercial explosives are organic compounds containing –NO_{2}, –ONO_{2}, and –NHNO_{2} groups that, when detonated, release gases like the aforementioned (e.g., nitroglycerin, TNT, octogen (HMX), PETN, nitrocellulose).

Traditional explosives mechanics are based on the shock-sensitive rapid oxidation of carbon and hydrogen to carbon dioxide, carbon monoxide, and water in the form of steam. Nitrates typically provide the required oxygen to burn the carbon and hydrogen fuel. A sensitizer such as powdered aluminum may be added to an explosive to increase the energy of the detonation. Once detonated, the nitrogen portion of the explosive formulation emerges as nitrogen gas and toxic nitric oxides.

The chemical decomposition of an explosive may take years, days, hours, or a fraction of a second. The slower processes of decomposition take place in storage and are of interest only from a stability standpoint. Of more interest are the other two rapid forms besides decomposition: deflagration and detonation.

==== Exotic ====
In addition to chemical and nuclear explosives, there are more exotic explosive materials.

=== By velocity ===
An explosive is classified as a low or high explosive according to its rate of combustion: low explosives deflagrate (burn rapidly), while high explosives detonate. While these definitions are distinct, the problem of precisely measuring rapid decomposition makes practical classification of explosives difficult. For a reaction to be classified as a detonation as opposed to just a deflagration, the propagation of the reaction shockwave through the material being tested must be faster than the speed of sound through that material. The speed of sound through a liquid or solid material is usually orders of magnitude faster than the speed of sound through air or other gases.

==== Low ====
Low explosives (or low-order explosives) are explosive materials that deflagrate, meaning that the explosion is propagated by a flame front that proceeds through the material at a subsonic speed.

In deflagration, the decomposition of explosive material is propagated by a flame front at subsonic speeds within the substance (which is usually still higher than 340 m/s or 1,220 km/h; 1,120 ft/s in most liquid or solid materials), in contrast to a shock wave in detonation, which travels at supersonic speed. Under normal conditions, low explosives undergo deflagration at rates that vary from a few centimetres per second to approximately 0.4 kilometres per second (Mach 1.2; 1,300 ft/s). It is possible for them to deflagrate more quickly, producing an effect similar to a detonation. This can happen under higher pressure (such as when gunpowder deflagrates inside the confined space of a bullet casing, accelerating the bullet to well beyond the speed of sound) or temperature.

A low explosive is usually a mixture of a combustible substance and an oxidant that decomposes rapidly; however, they burn more slowly than a high explosive, which has an extremely fast burn rate.

Low explosives are normally employed as propellants. Included in this group are petroleum products such as propane and gasoline, gunpowder (including smokeless powder), and light pyrotechnics such as flares and fireworks, but they can replace high explosives in certain applications, including gas pressure blasting.

==== High ====
High explosives (HE, or high-order explosives) are explosive materials that detonate, meaning that the explosion is propagated by an explosive shock front that passes through the material at supersonic speed. High explosives detonate with an explosive velocity of about 3–9 kilometres per second (9,800–29,500 ft/s). For instance, TNT has a detonation (burn) rate of approximately 6.9 km/s (Mach 20; 4.3 mi/s), detonating cord of 6.7 km/s (Mach 20; 4.2 mi/s), and C-4 about 8.0 km/s (Mach 24; 5.0 mi/s).

High explosives tend to have the fuel and oxidizer contained in the same molecule (e.g. TNT) while low explosives like gunpowder are usually mixtures of fuel (e.g. the sulfur and charcoal in gunpowder) and oxidizer (the saltpeter in gunpowder), causing the reaction front to propagate subsonically (deflagration).

High explosives are normally employed in mining, demolition, and military applications.

High explosives can be divided into two explosive classes differentiated by sensitivity: primary explosives and secondary explosives. Although tertiary explosives, such as ANFO at 3.2 km/s (Mach 9.4; 2.0 mi/s), can technically meet the explosive velocity definition, they are not considered high explosives in regulatory contexts.

Countless high-explosive compounds are chemically possible, but commercially and militarily important ones have included NG, TNT, TNP, IMX-101, RDX, HMX, PETN, EGDN, TATB, and HNS.

=== By sensitivity ===
==== Primary ====
A primary explosive is an explosive that is extremely sensitive to stimuli such as impact, friction, heat, static electricity, or electromagnetic radiation. Some primary explosives are also known as contact explosives. A relatively small amount of energy is required for initiation. As a very general rule, primary explosives are considered to be those compounds that are more sensitive than PETN. As a practical measure, primary explosives are sufficiently sensitive that they can be reliably initiated with a blow from a hammer; however, PETN can also usually be initiated in this manner, so this is only a very broad guideline. Additionally, several compounds, such as nitrogen triiodide, are so sensitive that they cannot even be handled without detonating. Nitrogen triiodide is so sensitive that it can be reliably detonated by exposure to alpha radiation.

Primary explosives are often used in detonators or to trigger larger charges of less sensitive secondary explosives. Primary explosives are commonly used in blasting caps and percussion caps to translate a physical shock signal. In other situations, different signals, such as electrical or physical shock, or, in the case of laser detonation systems, light, are used to initiate an action, i.e., an explosion. A small quantity, typically milligrams, is sufficient to initiate a larger charge of explosive that is usually safer to handle.

Examples of primary high explosives are:

- Acetone peroxide
- Alkali metal ozonides
- Ammonium permanganate
- Ammonium chlorate
- Azidotetrazolates
- Azoclathrates
- Benzoyl peroxide
- Benzvalene
- 3,5-Bis(trinitromethyl)tetrazole
- Chlorine oxides
- Copper(I) acetylide
- Copper(II) azide
- Cumene hydroperoxide
- Cycloprop(-2-)enyl nitrate (CXP or CPN)
- Cyanogen azide
- Cyanuric triazide
- Diacetyl peroxide
- 1-Diazidocarbamoyl-5-azidotetrazole
- Diazodinitrophenol
- Diazomethane
- Diethyl ether peroxide
- 4-Dimethylaminophenylpentazole
- Disulfur dinitride
- Ethyl azide
- Explosive antimony
- Fluorine perchlorate
- Fulminic acid
- Halogen azides:
  - Fluorine azide
  - Chlorine azide
  - Bromine azide
  - Iodine azide
- Hexamethylene triperoxide diamine
- Hydrazoic acid
- Hypofluorous acid
- Lead azide
- Lead styphnate
- Lead picrate
- Manganese heptoxide
- Mercury(II) fulminate
- Mercury nitride
- Methyl ethyl ketone peroxide
- Nickel hydrazine nitrate
- Nickel hydrazine perchlorate
- Nitrogen trihalides:
  - Nitrogen trichloride
  - Nitrogen tribromide
  - Nitrogen triiodide
- Nitroglycerin
- Nitronium perchlorate
- Nitrosyl perchlorate
- Nitrotetrazolate-N-oxides
- Pentazenium hexafluoroarsenate
- Peroxy acids
- Peroxymonosulfuric acid
- Selenium tetraazide
- Silicon tetraazide
- Silver azide
- Silver acetylide
- Silver fulminate
- Silver nitride
- Tellurium tetraazide
- tert-Butyl hydroperoxide
- Tetraamine copper complexes
- Tetraazidomethane
- Tetrazene explosive
- Tetrazoles
- Titanium tetraazide
- Triazidomethane
- Oxides of xenon:
  - Xenon dioxide
  - Xenon oxytetrafluoride
  - Xenon tetroxide
  - Xenon trioxide

==== Secondary ====
A secondary explosive is less sensitive than a primary explosive and requires substantially more energy to be initiated. Because they are less sensitive, they are usable in a wider variety of applications and are safer to handle and store. Secondary explosives are used in larger quantities in an explosive train and are usually initiated by a smaller quantity of a primary explosive.

Examples of secondary explosives include TNT and hexogen (RDX).

==== Tertiary ====
Tertiary explosives, also called blasting agents, are so insensitive to shock that they cannot be reliably detonated by practical quantities of primary explosives, and instead require an intermediate explosive booster of secondary explosives. These are often used for safety and the typically lower costs of material and handling. The largest consumers are large-scale mining and construction operations.

Most tertiaries include a fuel and an oxidizer. ANFO can be a tertiary explosive if its reaction rate is slow.

=== By physical form ===
Explosives are often characterized by the physical form that the explosives are produced or used in. These use forms are commonly categorized as:

- Pressings
- Castings
- Plastic or polymer bonded
- Plastic explosives, a.k.a. putties
- Rubberized
- Extrudable
- Binary
- Blasting agents
- Slurries and gels
- Dynamite

=== Shipping label classifications ===
Shipping labels and tags may include both United Nations and national markings.

United Nations markings include numbered Hazard Class and Division (HC/D) codes and alphabetic Compatibility Group codes. Though the two are related, they are separate and distinct. Any Compatibility Group designator can be assigned to any Hazard Class and Division. An example of this hybrid marking would be a consumer firework, which is labeled as 1.4G or 1.4S.

Examples of national markings would include United States Department of Transportation (U.S. DOT) codes.

==== United Nations (UN) GHS Hazard Class and Division ====
GHS Explosives transport pictogram

The UN GHS Hazard Class and Division (HC/D) is a numeric designator within a hazard class indicating the character, predominance of associated hazards, and potential for causing personnel casualties and property damage. It is an internationally accepted system that communicates, using the minimum amount of markings, the primary hazard associated with a substance.

Listed below are the Divisions for Class 1 (Explosives):

- 1.1 Mass Detonation Hazard. With HC/D 1.1, it is expected that if one item in a container or pallet inadvertently detonates, the explosion will sympathetically detonate the surrounding items. The explosion could propagate to all or the majority of the items stored together, causing a mass detonation. There will also be fragments from the item's casing and/or structures in the blast area.
- 1.2 Non-mass explosion, fragment-producing. HC/D 1.2 is further divided into three subdivisions, HC/D 1.2.1, 1.2.2, and 1.2.3, to account for the magnitude of the effects of an explosion.
- 1.3 Mass fire, minor blast, or fragment hazard. Propellants and many pyrotechnic items fall into this category. If one item in a package or stack initiates, it will usually propagate to the other items, creating a mass fire.
- 1.4 Moderate fire, no blast or fragment. HC/D 1.4 items are listed in the table as explosives with no significant hazard. Most small arms ammunition (including loaded weapons) and some pyrotechnic items fall into this category. If the energetic material in these items inadvertently initiates, most of the energy and fragments will be contained within the storage structure or the item containers themselves.
- 1.5 mass detonation hazard, very insensitive.
- 1.6 detonation hazard without mass detonation hazard, extremely insensitive.

To see an entire UNO table, browse Paragraphs 3–8 and 3–9 of NAVSEA OP 5, Vol. 1, Chapter 3.

==== Class 1 Compatibility Group ====
Compatibility Group codes are used to indicate storage compatibility for HC/D Class 1 (explosive) materials. Letters are used to designate 13 compatibility groups as follows.

- A: Primary explosive substance (1.1A).
- B: An article containing a primary explosive substance and not containing two or more effective protective features. Some articles, such as detonator assemblies for blasting and primers, cap-type, are included. (1.1B, 1.2B, 1.4B).
- C: Propellant explosive substance or other deflagrating explosive substance or article containing such explosive substance (1.1C, 1.2C, 1.3C, 1.4C). These are bulk propellants, propelling charges, and devices containing propellants with or without means of ignition. Examples include single-based propellant, double-based propellant, triple-based propellant, composite propellants, solid propellant rocket motors, and ammunition with inert projectiles.
- D: Secondary detonating explosive substance or black powder or article containing a secondary detonating explosive substance, in each case without means of initiation and without a propelling charge, or article containing a primary explosive substance and containing two or more effective protective features. (1.1D, 1.2D, 1.4D, 1.5D).
- E: Article containing a secondary detonating explosive substance without means of initiation, with a propelling charge (other than one containing flammable liquid, gel, or hypergolic liquid) (1.1E, 1.2E, 1.4E).
- F containing a secondary detonating explosive substance with its means of initiation, with a propelling charge (other than one containing flammable liquid, gel, or hypergolic liquid) or without a propelling charge (1.1F, 1.2F, 1.3F, 1.4F).
- G: Pyrotechnic substance or article containing a pyrotechnic substance, or article containing both an explosive substance and an illuminating, incendiary, tear-producing, or smoke-producing substance (other than a water-activated article or one containing white phosphorus, phosphide, flammable liquid, gel, or hypergolic liquid) (1.1G, 1.2G, 1.3G, 1.4G). Examples include flares, signals, incendiary or illuminating ammunition, and other smoke- and tear-producing devices.
- H: Article containing both an explosive substance and white phosphorus (1.2H, 1.3H). These articles will spontaneously combust when exposed to the atmosphere.
- J: Article containing both an explosive substance and flammable liquid or gel (1.1J, 1.2J, 1.3J). This excludes liquids or gels which are spontaneously flammable when exposed to water or the atmosphere, which belong in group H. Examples include liquid- or gel-filled incendiary ammunition, fuel-air explosive (FAE) devices, and flammable liquid-fueled missiles.
- K: Article containing both an explosive substance and a toxic chemical agent (1.2K, 1.3K)
- L Explosive substance or article containing an explosive substance and presenting a special risk (e.g., due to water activation or presence of hypergolic liquids, phosphides, or pyrophoric substances) needing isolation of each type (1.1L, 1.2L, 1.3L). Damaged or suspect ammunition of any group belongs in this group.
- N: Articles containing only extremely insensitive detonating substances (1.6N).
- S: Substance or article so packed or designed that any hazardous effects arising from accidental functioning are limited to the extent that they do not significantly hinder or prohibit firefighting or other emergency response efforts in the immediate vicinity of the package (1.4S).

== Properties ==
To determine the suitability of an explosive substance for a particular use, its physical properties must first be known. The usefulness of an explosive can only be appreciated when the properties and the factors affecting them are fully understood. Some of the more important characteristics are listed below:

=== Sensitivity ===
Sensitivity refers to the ease with which an explosive can be ignited or detonated, i.e., the amount and intensity of shock, friction, or heat that is required. When the term sensitivity is used, care must be taken to clarify what kind of sensitivity is under discussion. The relative sensitivity of a given explosive to impact may vary greatly from its sensitivity to friction or heat. Some test methods used to determine sensitivity relate to:

- Impact – Sensitivity is expressed in terms of the distance through which a standard weight must be dropped onto the material to cause it to explode.
- Friction – Sensitivity is expressed in terms of the amount of pressure applied to the material in order to create enough friction to cause a reaction.
- Heat – Sensitivity is expressed in terms of the temperature at which decomposition of the material occurs.

Specific explosives (usually but not always highly sensitive on one or more of the three above axes) may be idiosyncratically sensitive to such factors as pressure drop, acceleration, the presence of sharp edges or rough surfaces, incompatible materials, or even — in rare cases — nuclear or electromagnetic radiation. These factors present special hazards that may rule out any practical utility.

Sensitivity is an important consideration in selecting an explosive for a particular purpose. The explosive in an armor-piercing projectile must be relatively insensitive, or the shock of impact would cause it to detonate before it penetrated to the point desired. The explosive lenses around nuclear charges are also designed to be highly insensitive to minimize the risk of accidental detonation.

=== Sensitivity to initiation ===
The index of the capacity of an explosive to be initiated into detonation in a sustained manner. It is defined by the power of the detonator, which is certain to prime the explosive to a sustained and continuous detonation. Reference is made to the Sellier-Bellot scale that consists of a series of 10 detonators, from n. 1 to n. 10, each of which corresponds to an increasing charge weight. In practice, most of the explosives on the market today are sensitive to an n. 8 detonator, where the charge corresponds to 2 grams of mercury fulminate.

=== Velocity of detonation ===
The velocity with which the reaction process propagates in the mass of the explosive. Most commercial mining explosives have detonation velocities ranging from 1,800 m/s to 8,000 m/s. Today, the velocity of detonation can be measured with accuracy. Together with density, it is an important element influencing the yield of the energy transmitted through both atmospheric overpressure and ground acceleration. By definition, a "low explosive", such as black powder or smokeless gunpowder, has a burn rate of 171–631 m/s. In contrast, a "high explosive", whether a primary, such as detonating cord, or a secondary, such as TNT or C-4, has a significantly higher burn rate of about 6900–8092 m/s.

=== Stability ===
Stability is the ability of an explosive to be stored without deterioration.

The following factors affect the stability of an explosive:

- Chemical constitution. In the strictest technical sense, the word "stability" is a thermodynamic term referring to the energy of a substance relative to a reference state or to some other substance. However, in the context of explosives, stability commonly refers to ease of detonation, which is concerned with chemical kinetics (i.e., rate of decomposition). It is perhaps best, then, to differentiate between the terms "thermodynamically stable" and "kinetically stable" by referring to the former as "inert." Contrarily, a kinetically unstable substance is said to be "labile." It is generally recognized that certain groups, like nitro (–NO_{2}), nitrate (–ONO_{2}), and azide (–N_{3}), are intrinsically labile. Kinetically, there exists a low activation barrier to the decomposition reaction. Consequently, these compounds exhibit high sensitivity to flame or mechanical shock. The chemical bonding in these compounds is characterized as predominantly covalent, and thus they are not thermodynamically stabilized by a high ionic-lattice energy. Furthermore, they generally have positive enthalpies of formation, and there is little mechanistic hindrance to internal molecular rearrangement to yield the more thermodynamically stable (more strongly bonded) decomposition products. For example, in lead azide, Pb(N_{3})_{2}, the nitrogen atoms are already bonded to one another, so decomposition into Pb and N_{2}^{[1]} is relatively easy.
- Temperature of storage. The rate of decomposition of explosives increases at higher temperatures. All standard military explosives may be considered to have a high degree of stability at temperatures from –10 to +35 °C, but each has a high temperature at which its rate of thermal decomposition rapidly accelerates and stability is reduced. As a rule of thumb, most explosives become dangerously unstable at temperatures above 70 °C.
- Exposure to sunlight. When exposed to the ultraviolet rays of sunlight, many explosive compounds containing nitrogen groups rapidly decompose, affecting their stability.
- Electrical discharge. Electrostatic or spark sensitivity to initiation is common in several explosives. Static or other electrical discharge may be sufficient to cause a reaction, even detonation, under some circumstances. As a result, safe handling of explosives and pyrotechnics usually requires proper electrical grounding of the operator.

=== Power, performance, and strength ===
The term power or performance as applied to an explosive, refers to its ability to do work. In practice it is defined as the explosive's ability to accomplish what is intended in the way of energy delivery (i.e., fragment projection, air blast, high-velocity jet, underwater shock and bubble energy, etc.). Explosive power or performance is evaluated by a tailored series of tests to assess the material for its intended use. Of the tests listed below, cylinder expansion and air-blast tests are common to most testing programs, and the others support specific applications.

- Cylinder expansion test. A standard amount of explosive is loaded into a long hollow cylinder, usually of copper, and detonated at one end. Data is collected concerning the rate of radial expansion of the cylinder and the maximum cylinder wall velocity. This also establishes the Gurney energy, or 2E.
- Cylinder fragmentation. A standard steel cylinder is loaded with explosives and detonated in a sawdust pit. The fragments are collected and the size distribution analyzed.
- Detonation pressure (Chapman–Jouguet condition). Detonation pressure data are derived from measurements of shock waves transmitted into water by the detonation of cylindrical explosive charges of a standard size.
- Determination of critical diameter. This test establishes the minimum physical size a charge of a specific explosive must be to sustain its own detonation wave. The procedure involves the detonation of a series of charges of different diameters until difficulty in detonation wave propagation is observed.
- Massive-diameter detonation velocity. Detonation velocity is dependent on loading density (c), charge diameter, and grain size. The hydrodynamic theory of detonation used in predicting explosive phenomena does not include the diameter of the charge, and therefore a detonation velocity, for a massive diameter. This procedure requires the firing of a series of charges of the same density and physical structure but different diameters and the extrapolation of the resulting detonation velocities to predict the detonation velocity of a charge of a massive diameter.
- Pressure versus scaled distance. A charge of a specific size is detonated, and its pressure effects are measured at a standard distance. The values obtained are compared with those for TNT.
- Impulse versus scaled distance. A charge of a specific size is detonated, and its impulse (the area under the pressure-time curve) is measured as a function of distance. The results are tabulated and expressed as TNT equivalents.
- Relative bubble energy (RBE). A 5 to 50 kg charge is detonated in water, and piezoelectric gauges measure peak pressure, time constant, impulse, and energy.

The RBE may be defined as K_{x} 3
RBE = K_{s}
where K = the bubble expansion period for an experimental (x) or a standard (s) charge.

=== Brisance ===
In addition to strength, explosives display a second characteristic, which is their shattering effect, or brisance (from the French meaning "to break"). Brisance is important in determining the effectiveness of an explosion in fragmenting shells, bomb casings, and grenades. The rapidity with which an explosive reaches its peak pressure (power) is a measure of its brisance. Brisance values are primarily employed in France and Russia.

The sand crush test is commonly employed to determine the relative brisance in comparison to TNT. No test is capable of directly comparing the explosive properties of two or more compounds; it is important to examine the data from several such tests (sand crush, trauzl, and so forth) in order to gauge relative brisance. True values for comparison require field experiments.

=== Density ===
Density of loading refers to the mass of an explosive per unit volume. Several methods of loading are available, including pellet loading, cast loading, and press loading, the choice being determined by the characteristics of the explosive. Dependent upon the method employed, an average density of the loaded charge can be obtained that is within 80–99% of the theoretical maximum density of the explosive. High load density can reduce sensitivity by making the mass more resistant to internal friction. However, if density is increased to the extent that individual crystals are crushed, the explosive may become more sensitive. Increased load density also permits the use of more explosives, thereby increasing the power of the warhead. It is possible to compress an explosive beyond a point of sensitivity, known also as dead-pressing, in which the material is no longer capable of being reliably initiated, if at all.

=== Volatility ===
Volatility is the readiness with which a substance vaporizes. Excessive volatility often results in the development of pressure within rounds of ammunition and separation of mixtures into their constituents. Volatility affects the chemical composition of the explosive such that a marked reduction in stability may occur, which results in an increase in the danger of handling.

=== Hygroscopicity and water resistance ===
The introduction of water into an explosive is highly undesirable since it reduces the sensitivity, strength, and velocity of detonation of the explosive. Hygroscopicity is a measure of a material's moisture-absorbing tendencies. Moisture affects explosives adversely by acting as an inert material that absorbs heat when vaporized and by acting as a solvent medium that can cause undesired chemical reactions. Sensitivity, strength, and velocity of detonation are reduced by inert materials that reduce the continuity of the explosive mass. When the moisture content evaporates during detonation, cooling occurs, which reduces the temperature of the reaction. Stability is also affected by the presence of moisture since moisture promotes decomposition of the explosive and, in addition, causes corrosion of the explosive's metal container.

Explosives considerably differ from one another as to their behavior in the presence of water. Gelatin dynamites containing nitroglycerin have a degree of water resistance. Explosives based on ammonium nitrate have little or no water resistance as ammonium nitrate is highly soluble in water and is hygroscopic.

=== Toxicity ===
Many explosives are toxic to some extent. Manufacturing inputs can also be organic compounds or hazardous materials that require special handling due to risks (such as carcinogens). The decomposition products, residual solids, or gases of some explosives can be toxic, whereas others are harmless, such as carbon dioxide and water.

Examples of harmful by-products are:

- Heavy metals, such as lead, mercury, and barium from primers (observed in high-volume firing ranges)
- Nitric oxides from TNT
- Perchlorates when used in large quantities

"Green explosives" seek to reduce environmental and health impacts. An example of such is the lead-free primary explosive copper(I) 5-nitrotetrazolate, an alternative to lead azide.

=== Explosive train ===
Explosive material may be incorporated in the explosive train of a device or system. An example is a pyrotechnic lead igniting a booster, which causes the main charge to detonate.

=== Volume of products of explosion ===
The most widely used explosives are condensed liquids or solids converted to gaseous products by explosive chemical reactions and the energy released by those reactions. The gaseous products of complete reaction are typically carbon dioxide, steam, and nitrogen. Gaseous volumes computed by the ideal gas law tend to be too large at high pressures characteristic of explosions. Ultimate volume expansion may be estimated at three orders of magnitude, or one liter per gram of explosive. Explosives with an oxygen deficit will generate soot or gases like carbon monoxide and hydrogen, which may react with surrounding materials such as atmospheric oxygen. Attempts to obtain more precise volume estimates must consider the possibility of such side reactions, condensation of steam, and aqueous solubility of gases like carbon dioxide.

=== Oxygen balance (OB% or Ω) ===
Oxygen balance is an expression that is used to indicate the degree to which an explosive can be oxidized. If an explosive molecule contains enough oxygen to convert all of its carbon to carbon dioxide, all of its hydrogen to water, and all of its metal to metal oxide with no excess, the molecule has a zero oxygen balance. The molecule has a positive oxygen balance if it contains more oxygen than is needed and a negative oxygen balance if it contains less oxygen than is needed. The sensitivity, strength, and brisance of an explosive are all somewhat dependent upon oxygen balance and tend to approach their maxima as oxygen balance approaches zero.

=== Chemical composition ===
A chemical explosive may consist of either a chemically pure compound, such as nitroglycerin, or a mixture of a fuel and an oxidizer, such as black powder or grain dust and air.

==== Pure compounds ====
Some chemical compounds are unstable in that, when shocked, they react, possibly to the point of detonation. Each molecule of the compound dissociates into two or more new molecules (generally gases) with the release of energy.

- Nitroglycerin: A highly sensitive colorless liquid
- Acetone peroxide: A very unstable white organic peroxide
- TNT: Yellow insensitive crystals that can be melted and cast without detonation
- Cellulose nitrate: A nitrated polymer which can be a high or low explosive depending on nitration level and conditions
- RDX, PETN, HMX: Very powerful explosives which can be used pure or in plastic explosives
  - C-4 (or Composition C-4): An RDX plastic explosive plasticized to be adhesive and malleable

The above compositions may describe most of the explosive material, but a practical explosive will often include small percentages of other substances. For example, dynamite is a mixture of highly sensitive nitroglycerin with sawdust, powdered silica, or, most commonly, diatomaceous earth, which act as stabilizers. Plastics and polymers may be added to bind powders of explosive compounds; waxes may be incorporated to make them safer to handle; aluminium powder may be introduced to increase total energy and blast effects. Explosive compounds are also often "alloyed": HMX or RDX powders may be mixed (typically by melt-casting) with TNT to form Octol or Cyclotol.

==== Oxidized fuel ====
An oxidizer is a pure substance (molecule) that in a chemical reaction can contribute some atoms of one or more oxidizing elements, in which the fuel component of the explosive burns. On the simplest level, the oxidizer may itself be an oxidizing element, such as gaseous or liquid oxygen.

- Black powder: Potassium nitrate, charcoal, and sulfur
- Flash powder: Fine metal powder (usually aluminium or magnesium) and a strong oxidizer (e.g., potassium chlorate or perchlorate)
- Ammonal: Ammonium nitrate and aluminium powder
- Armstrong's mixture: Potassium chlorate and red phosphorus. This is a very sensitive mixture. It is a primary high explosive in which sulfur is substituted for some or all of the phosphorus to slightly decrease sensitivity.
- Sprengel explosives: A very general class incorporating any strong oxidizer and highly reactive fuel, although in practice the name was most commonly applied to mixtures of chlorates and nitroaromatics.
  - ANFO: Ammonium nitrate and fuel oil
  - Cheddites: Chlorates or perchlorates and oil
  - Oxyliquits: Mixtures of organic materials and liquid oxygen
  - Panclastites: Mixtures of organic materials and dinitrogen tetroxide

== Activation ==
There are more exotic methods of causing explosions. Examples include abruptly heating a substance to a plasma state with a high-intensity laser or electric arc. Laser- and arc-heating are used in laser detonators, exploding-bridgewire detonators, and exploding foil initiators, where a shock wave and then detonation in conventional chemical explosive material is created by laser or electric arc heating. Laser and electric energy are not currently used in practice to generate most of the required energy but only to initiate reactions.

== Regulation ==
The legality of possessing or using explosives varies by jurisdiction. Various countries around the world have enacted explosives laws and require licenses to manufacture, distribute, store, use, or possess explosives or ingredients.

=== Netherlands ===
In the Netherlands, the civil and commercial use of explosives is covered under the Wet explosieven voor civiel gebruik (explosives for civil use Act), in accordance with EU directive nr. 93/15/EEG (Dutch). The illegal use of explosives is covered under the Wet Wapens en Munitie (Weapons and Munition Act) (Dutch).

=== United Kingdom ===
The new Explosives Regulations 2014 (ER 2014) came into force on 1 October 2014 and defines "explosive" as:

- any explosive article or explosive substance which would —
  - if packaged for transport, be classified in accordance with the United Nations Recommendations as falling within Class 1; or
  - be classified in accordance with the United Nations Recommendations as —
    - being unduly sensitive or so reactive as to be subject to spontaneous reaction and accordingly too dangerous to transport, and
    - falling within Class 1; or
- a desensitised explosive,

but it does not include an explosive substance produced as part of a manufacturing process which thereafter reprocesses it in order to produce a substance or preparation which is not an explosive substance"

"Anyone who wishes to acquire and or keep relevant explosives needs to contact their local police explosives liaison officer. All explosives are relevant explosives apart from those listed under Schedule 2 of Explosives Regulations 2014." [sic]

=== United States ===
During World War I, numerous laws were created to regulate war-related industries and increase security within the United States. In 1917, the 65th United States Congress created many laws, including the Espionage Act of 1917 and the Explosives Act of 1917.

The Explosives Act of 1917 (session 1, chapter 83, 40 Stat. 385) was signed on 6 October 1917 and went into effect on 16 November 1917. The legal summary is "An Act to prohibit the manufacture, distribution, storage, use, and possession in time of war of explosives, providing regulations for the safe manufacture, distribution, storage, use, and possession of the same, and for other purposes". This was the first federal regulation of licensing explosives purchases. The act was deactivated after World War I ended.

After the United States entered World War II, the Explosives Act of 1917 was reactivated. In 1947, the act was deactivated by President Truman.

The Organized Crime Control Act of 1970 (Pub. L. 91–452) transferred many explosives regulations to the Bureau of Alcohol, Tobacco and Firearms (ATF) of the Department of Treasury. The bill became effective in 1971.

Currently, regulations are governed by Title 18 of the United States Code and Title 27 of the Code of Federal Regulations:

- "Importation, Manufacture, Distribution and Storage of Explosive Materials" (18 U.S.C. Chapter 40).
- "Commerce in Explosives" (27 C.F.R. Chapter II, Part 555).

== List of explosives ==
=== Compounds ===
==== Acetylides ====
- Copper(I) acetylide, Dichloroacetylene, Silver acetylide

==== Fulminates ====
- Fulminic acid, Mercury(II) fulminate, Platinum fulminate, Potassium fulminate, Silver fulminate

==== Nitro ====
- MonoNitro: Nitroguanidine, Nitroethane, Nitromethane, Nitropropane, Nitrourea
- DiNitro: Diazo dinitro phenol, Dinitrobenzene, Dinitroethylene urea, DNN, Dinitrophenol, Dinitrophenolate, DNPH, Dinitroresorcinol, Dinitropentano nitrile, Polydinitropropyl acrylate, Dinitro cerine, Dipicryl sulfone, Dipicrylamine, EDNP, KDNBF, BEAF, DADNE
- TriNitro: RDX, Diaminotrinitrobenzene, Triaminotrinitrobenzene, Lead styphnate, Lead picrate, Trinitroaniline, Trinitroanisole, TNAS, TNB, TNBA, Styphnic acid, MC, Trinitroethyl formal, TNOC, TNOF, TNP, TNT, TNN, TNPG, TNR, BTNEN, BTNEC, Ammonium picrate, TNS
- TetraNitro: Tetryl, HMX
- HexaNitro: HNS, HNIW, HHTDD
- HeptaNitro: Heptanitrocubane
- OctaNitro: Octanitrocubane

==== Nitrosos ====
- Trinitrosos: R-salt

==== Nitrates ====
- Mononitrates: Ammonium nitrate, Methyl ammonium nitrate, Urea Nitrate
- Dinitrates: Diethyleneglycol dinitrate, Ethylenediamine dinitrate, Ethylene dinitramine, Ethylene glycol dinitrate, Hexamethylenetetramine dinitrate, Triethylene glycol dinitrate
- Trinitrates: 1,2,4-Butanetriol trinitrate, Trimethylolethane trinitrate, Nitroglycerin
- Tetranitrates: Erythritol tetranitrate, Pentaerythritol tetranitrate, Tetranitratoxycarbon
- Pentanitrates: Xylitol pentanitrate
- Polynitrates: Nitrocellulose, Nitrostarch, Mannitol hexanitrate

==== Amines ====
- Tertiary Amines: Nitrogen tribromide, Nitrogen trichloride, Nitrogen triiodide, Nitrogen trisulfide, Selenium nitride, Silver nitride
- Diamines: Disulfur dinitride
- Tetramines: Tetrazene, Tetrazole, Azidoazide azide
- Pentamines: Pentazenium
- Octamines: Octaazacubane, 1,1'-Azobis-1,2,3-triazole

==== Azides ====
- Inorganic: Chlorine azide, Copper(II) azide, Fluorine azide, Hydrazoic acid, Lead(II) azide, Silver azide, Sodium azide, Rubidium azide, Selenium tetraazide, Silicon tetraazide, Tellurium tetraazide, Titanium tetraazide
- Organic: Cyanuric triazide, Cyanogen azide, Ethyl azide, Tetraazidomethane

==== Peroxides ====
- Acetone peroxide (TATP), Cumene hydroperoxide, Diacetyl peroxide, Dibenzoyl peroxide, Diethyl ether peroxide, Hexamethylene triperoxide diamine, Methyl ethyl ketone peroxide, Tert-butyl hydroperoxide, Tetramethylene diperoxide dicarbamide

==== Oxides ====
- Xenon oxytetrafluoride, Xenon dioxide, Xenon trioxide, Xenon tetroxide

==== Unsorted ====
- Alkali metal Ozonides
- Ammonium chlorate
- Ammonium perchlorate
- Ammonium permanganate
- Azidotetrazolates
- Azoclathrates
- Benzvalene
- Chlorine oxides
- DMAPP
- Fluorine perchlorate
- Fulminating gold
- Fulminating silver (several substances)
- Hexafluoroantimonate
- Hexafluoroarsenate
- Hypofluorous acid
- Manganese heptoxide
- Mercury nitride
- Nitronium perchlorate
- Nitrotetrazolate-N-Oxides
- Peroxy acids
- Peroxymonosulfuric acid
- Tetramine copper complexes
- Tetrasulfur tetranitride

=== Mixtures ===
- Aluminum Orphorite, Amatex, Amatol, Ammonal, Armstrong's mixture, ANFO, ANNMAL, Astrolite
- Baranol, Baratol, Ballistite, Butyl tetryl
- Carbonite, Composition A, Composition B, Composition C, Composition 1, Composition 2, Composition 3, Composition 4, Composition 5, Composition H6, Cordtex, Cyclotol
- Danubit, Detasheet, Detonating cord, Dualin, Dunnite, Dynamite
- Ecrasite, Ednatol
- Flash powder
- Gelignite, Gunpowder
- Hexanite, Hydromite 600
- Kinetite
- Minol
- Octol, Oxyliquit
- Panclastite, Pentolite, Picratol, PNNM, Pyrotol
- Schneiderite, Semtex, Shellite
- Tannerit simply, Tannerite, Titadine, Tovex, Torpex, Tritonal

=== Elements and isotopes ===
- Alkali metals
- Explosive antimony
- Plutonium-239
- Uranium-235

== See also ==
- Blast injury
- Detection dog
- Flame speed
- Improvised explosive device
- Insensitive munition
- Largest artificial non-nuclear explosions
- Nuclear weapon
- Orica; largest supplier of commercial explosives
- TM 31-210 Improvised Munitions Handbook
- Total body disruption
- Traveling charge
