= Contact explosive =

Substance which explodes when exposed to small amounts of energy

Nitrogen triiodide explosion

A contact explosive is a chemical substance that explodes violently when it is exposed to a relatively small amount of energy (e.g. friction, pressure, sound, light). Though different contact explosives have varying amounts of energy sensitivity, they are all much more sensitive relative to other kinds of explosives. Contact explosives are a part of a group of explosives called primary explosives, which are also very sensitive to stimuli but not to the degree of contact explosives. The extreme sensitivity of contact explosives is due to either chemical composition, bond type, or structure.

== Types ==
These are some common contact explosives.

Compound	Sensitivity	Sensitive to	Type of explosion
Acetone peroxide	Very high	Heat, flame, shock, friction	Entropic
Chlorine azide	Extreme	Friction, shock, chemicals	Energy, entropic
Copper(II) azide	Extreme	Shock, static	Energy
Fulminates	Very high	Friction, static, heat, flame, shock	Energy
Lead(II) azide	High	Shock, static	Energy
Nitrogen triiodide	Extreme	Shock, friction, pressure, sound, light, alpha radiation	Energy, entropic
Picric acid (dry)	Moderate	Shock, friction	Energy
Tetrasulfur tetranitride	Moderate	Shock, friction	Energy, entropic
Flash powder like Armstrong's mixture	High	Static, flame, friction	Energy, light
Silver nitride	Extreme	Shock	Energy

== Reasons for instability ==
=== Composition ===
==== Presence of nitrogen ====
N_{2} molecule

Explosives that are nitrogen-based are incredibly volatile due to the stability of nitrogen in its diatomic state, N_{2}. Most organic explosives are explosive because they contain nitrogen. They are defined as nitro compounds.

Nitro compounds are explosive because although the diatomic form of nitrogen is very stable—that is, the triple bond that holds N_{2} together is very strong, and therefore has a great deal of bond energy—the nitro compounds themselves are unstable, as the bonds between nitrogen atoms and other atoms in nitro compounds are weak by comparison. Therefore, little energy is required to overcome these weak bonds, but a great deal of energy is released in the exothermic process in which the strong triple bonds in N_{2} are formed. The rapidity of the reaction, due to the weakness of the bonds in nitro compounds, and the high quantity of overall energy released, due to the much higher strength of the triple bonds, produce the explosive qualities of these compounds.

==== Oxidizer and fuel ====
Some contact explosives contain an oxidizer and a fuel in their composition. Chemicals like gasoline, a fuel, burn instead of explode because they must come into contact with oxygen in the combustion reaction. However, if the compound already contains both the oxidant and fuel, it produces a much faster and violent reaction.

=== Bonds and structure ===
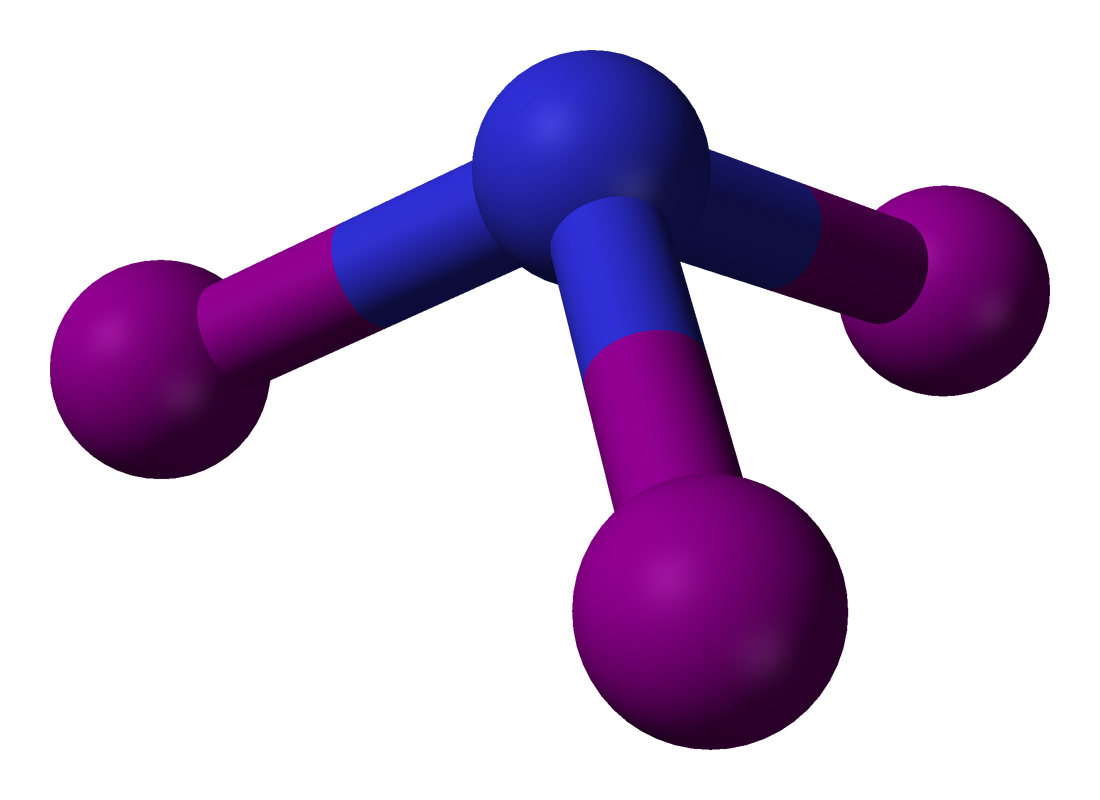
Nitrogen triiodide atomic shape

The structures and bonds that make up a contact explosive contribute to its instability. Covalent compounds that have a large unequal sharing of electrons have the capability to fall apart very easily and explosively. Nitrogen triiodide, for example, features three iodine atoms weakly covalently bound to the far more electronegative nitrogen atom. The valence shell electrons of iodine, located one orbital above that of nitrogen, strongly preferentially lean towards the nitrogen atom, making the bond weak, thus leading to a low activation energy for dissociation. The bond is thus easily broken with little input energy, in turn providing energy for nearby molecules to dissociate, leading to an explosive chain reaction due to the large amount of excess energy released.

The shape of the contact explosive molecule plays a role in its instability as well. Using nitrogen triiodide as an example again, its pyramidal shape forces the three iodine atoms to be much closer together than if they were in a planar configuration, further weakening stability through steric hindrance.

Compound	Reason for instability
Acetone peroxide	Composition allows for initiation reaction
Chlorine azide	Nitrogen
Copper(II) azide	Nitrogen
Fulminates	Instability of fulminate ion
Lead(II) azide	Nitrogen
Nitrogen triiodide	Unstable intramolecular bonds
Nitroglycerin	Nitrogen, Oxidizer and fuel
Picric acid (dry)	Nitrogen
Tetrasulfur tetranitride	Nitrogen, Unstable intramolecular bonds
Flash Powder	Oxidizer and metallic fuel
Silver nitride	Unstable intramolecular bonds

== Uses ==
Contact explosives are used in a variety of fields.

=== Military ===
Picric acid molecule

Militaries use a variety of contact explosives in combat. Some can be manufactured into different types of bombs, tactical grenades, and even explosive bullets. Dry picric acid, which is more powerful than TNT, was used in blasting charges and artillery shells. A lot of contact explosives are used in detonators. For explosives that use secondary explosives, contact explosives are used in the detonators to set off an energy chain reaction that will eventually set off the secondary explosive.

Compounds like lead azide are used to manufacture bullets that explode into shrapnel on impact.

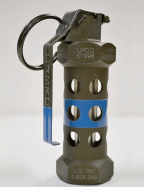
Stun grenade

Flash powders are used in a variety of military and police tactical pyrotechnics. Stun grenades, flash bangs, and flares all use flash powder to create bright, flashing lights and loud noise that disorients the enemy.

On the other hand, many of these cheap, volatile contact explosives are also used in improvised explosive devices (IEDs) created by terrorists and suicide bombers. For example, acetone peroxide passes through explosive detectors and is incredibly powerful, unstable, and deadly. Evidence for the instability of these IEDs lies in the multiple reports of premature or wrongful IED explosions. However, when these explosives are used correctly, they have devastating consequences. The July 7, 2005, London bombings, the 2015 Paris attacks, and the 2016 Brussels bombings all used explosives that contained acetone peroxide.

=== Medicine ===
Angina pectoris, a symptom of Ischaemic heart disease, is treated with nitroglycerin. Nitroglycerin is known as a vasodilator. Vasodilators work by relaxing the heart's blood vessels so the heart does not need to work as hard. Picric acid specifically has been used for burn treatment and as an Antiseptic.

=== Theatrical/fireworks ===
The same flash powder used for military tactical pyrotechnics can also be used for several theatrical special effects. They are used to produce loud, bright flashes of light for effect. Though some flash powders are too volatile and dangerous to be safely used, there are milder compounds that are still incorporated into performances today.

Silver Fulminate is used to make noise-makers, small contact poppers, and several other novelty fireworks. It is most widely used in bang snaps. In these small explosives, a minuscule amount of silver fulminate is encased in gravel and cigarette paper. Even with this small amount of silver fulminate, it produces a loud, sharp bang.

== See also ==
- Shock sensitivity
