= TNX (disambiguation) =

TNX may refer to:

- TNX, consisting musical groups collectively known as Nice Girl Project!
- TNX (group), the K-pop group
- Trinitroxylene, a high explosive
- tnx, the ISO 639-3 code for Tanema language
- Tonopah Test Range Airport, the FAA LID code TNX
- TNX, a high explosive, similar to RDX
