= Cadmium nitride =

Compound of cadmium and nitrogen

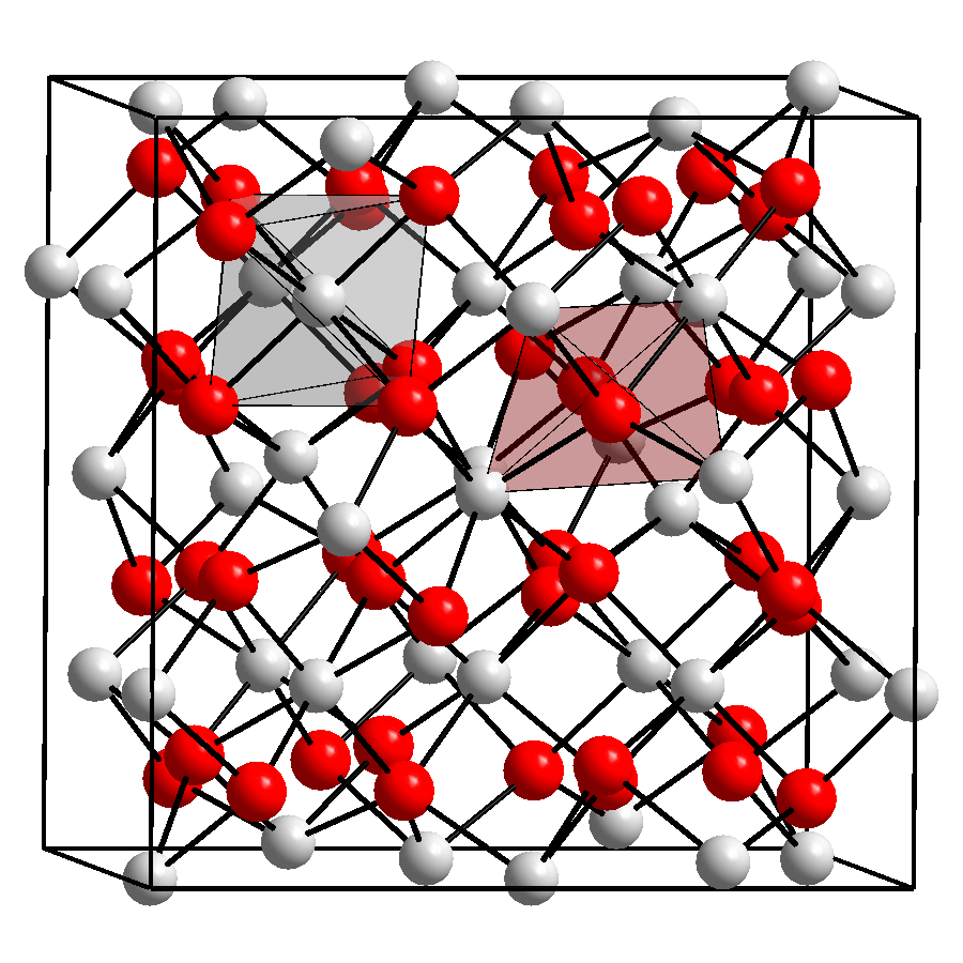

Identifiers
CAS Number	12380-95-9
3D model (JSmol)	Interactive image
- InChI: InChI=1S/3Cd.2N/q3*+2;2*-3 Key: DSZUCHKZKXFZPK-UHFFFAOYSA-N
- SMILES: [Cd+2].[Cd+2].[Cd+2].[N-3].[N-3]

Properties
Chemical formula	Cd_{3}N_{2}
Molar mass	365.256 g·mol^{−1}
Appearance	black solid
Density	7.67 g·cm^{−3}

Related compounds
Other cations	Zinc nitride Mercury nitride
- Except where otherwise noted, data are given for materials in their standard state (at 25 °C [77 °F], 100 kPa). Infobox references

Cadmium nitride is a nitride of cadmium with the chemical formula Cd_{3}N_{2}.

== Preparation ==
Cadmium nitride can be produced by thermal decomposition of cadmium amide at 180 °C:

3 Cd(NH_{2})_{2} → Cd_{3}N_{2} + 4 NH_{3}

It can also be produced by thermal decomposition of cadmium azide at 210 °C.

== Properties ==
Cadmium nitride is a black solid that decomposes on contact with water and air. It will explode when reacting with dilute acids or alkalis. It is a crystal of inverse manganese(III) oxide structure with lattice constant a = 1079 pm.
