= C8H10N6 =

The molecular formula C_{8}H_{10}N_{6} (molar mass: 190.20 g/mol, exact mass: 190.0967 u) may refer to:

- Dihydralazine
- 4-Dimethylaminophenylpentazole
