= Hexamethylene triperoxide diamine =

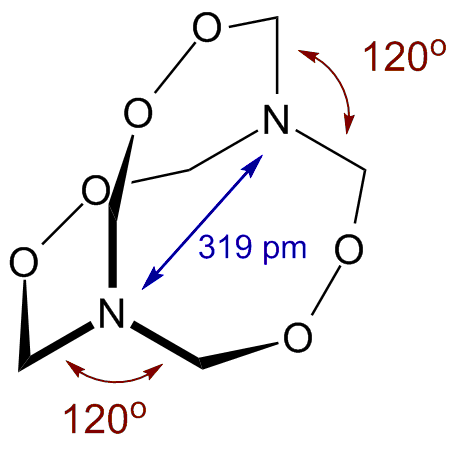

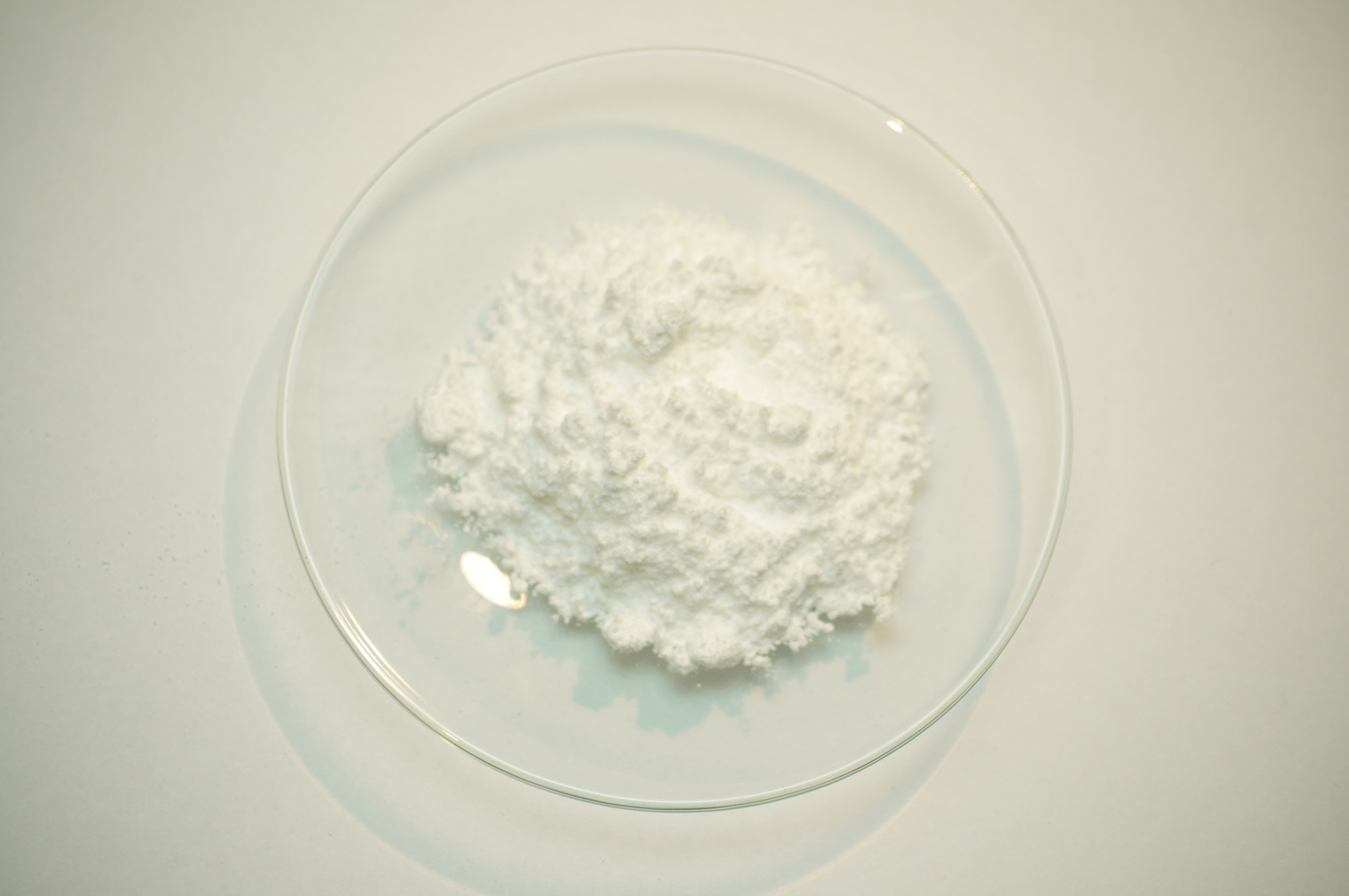

Names
- Preferred IUPAC name 3,4,8,9,12,13-Hexaoxa-1,6-diazabicyclo[4.4.4]tetradecane

Identifiers
CAS Number	283-66-9
3D model (JSmol)	Interactive image
ChEMBL	ChEMBL346085
ChemSpider	55052
PubChem CID	61101
CompTox Dashboard (EPA)	DTXSID9074804
- InChI: InChI=1S/C6H12N2O6/c1-7-2-11-13-5-8(4-10-9-1)6-14-12-3-7/h1-6H2 Key: HMWPNDNFTFSCEB-UHFFFAOYSA-N; InChI=1/C6H12N2O6/c1-7-2-11-13-5-8(4-10-9-1)6-14-12-3-7/h1-6H2 Key: HMWPNDNFTFSCEB-UHFFFAOYAC
- SMILES: C1N2COOCN(COO1)COOC2

Properties
Chemical formula	C_{6}H_{12}N_{2}O_{6}
Molar mass	208.17 g/mol
Appearance	White crystalline solid
Density	1.57 g/cm^{3}
Melting point	Decomposes at 75 °C; Ignites spontaneously at 133 °C

Hazards
- Occupational safety and health (OHS/OSH)
Main hazards	Explosive
- GHS labelling
Pictograms	(GHS01: Explosive) (GHS07: Exclamation mark)
Signal word	Danger
Hazard statements	H202, H205, H241, H300, H315, H318, H335
Precautionary statements	P102, P220, P243, P250, P261, P264, P280, P283, P370+P380, P372, P404
NFPA 704 (fire diamond)	1 1 4

Explosive data
Shock sensitivity	High
Friction sensitivity	Very High
Detonation velocity	~2800 m/s (at around 0.4 g/cm^{3}) - 5100 m/s at around 1.1 g/cm^{3}
RE factor	0.74
- Except where otherwise noted, data are given for materials in their standard state (at 25 °C [77 °F], 100 kPa). verify (what is ?) Infobox references

Hexamethylene triperoxide diamine (HMTD) is a high explosive organic compound. HMTD is an organic peroxide, a heterocyclic compound with a cage-like structure. It is a primary explosive. It has been considered as an initiating explosive for blasting caps in the early part of 20th century, mostly because of its high initiating power (higher than that of mercury fulminate) and its inexpensive production. As such, it was quickly taken up as a primary explosive in mining applications. However, it has since been superseded by more (chemically) stable compounds such as dextrinated lead azide and DDNP (which contains no lead or mercury). HMTD is widely used in amateur-made blasting caps.

== Preparation and structure ==
First synthesised in 1885 by the German chemist Ludwig Legler, HMTD may be prepared by the reaction of an aqueous solution of hydrogen peroxide and hexamine in the presence of an acid catalyst, such as citric acid, acetic acid or dilute sulfuric acid. The hydrogen peroxide needs to be at least 12% w/w concentration, as lower concentrations lead to poor yields. Citric acid is overall superior to other acids, providing a yield of up to about 50%.

The molecule adopts a cage-like structure with the nitrogen atoms having an unusual trigonal planar geometry.

== Properties as an explosive ==
Like other organic peroxides, such as acetone peroxide (TATP), HMTD is unstable and detonated by shock, friction, static electricity discharges, concentrated sulfuric acid, strong UV radiation and heat. Common static electricity discharges have been reported to cause detonation. It attacks aluminum, tin, zinc, brass, copper, lead and iron.

HMTD is very unstable in storage, with decomposition rate increasing with temperature. Samples lost 79% of their weight in 300 days at 50 °C (122 °F), in 150 days at 70 °C (158 °F), and in only 5–20 days at 90 °C (194 °F). It is unstable even when stored under water.

HMTD is a more powerful initiating explosive than mercury fulminate, but its poor thermal and chemical stability prevents its use in detonators. Nevertheless, HMTD is one of the three most widely used primary explosives in improvised, amateur made blasting caps, the others being TATP and silver acetylide.

HMTD is a common source of injury, particularly finger amputations, among amateur chemists. Most of these injuries are caused by small amounts of HMTD that inadvertently detonate in close proximity of fingers, since small amounts (grams) are generally not powerful enough to amputate fingers from distances larger than 5–10 cm (2.0–3.9 in).

Reported explosive properties are a detonation velocity of 4,511 m/s (14,800 ft/s) in a 0.22 in (5.6 mm) column compressed to a density of 0.88 g/cm^{3} and 5,100 m/s (17,000 ft/s) at a density of 1.1 g/cm^{3}. Its power is 60% that of TNT in the Trauzl test.

== Sensitivity ==
HMTD is overall slightly more sensitive than fresh TATP and can be considered to be slightly more dangerous than an average primary explosive. The variance of friction force between different surfaces (e.g. different kinds of paper) is often greater than the variance between the friction sensitivity of a given pair of primary explosives. This leads to different values for friction sensitivity measured at different laboratories.

== Terrorism use ==
Despite no longer being used in any military application, and despite its shock sensitivity, HMTD remains a common home-made explosive and has been used in a large number of suicide bombings and other attacks throughout the world. For example, it was one of the components in the explosives intended to bomb Los Angeles International Airport in the 2000 millennium attack plots and the 2016 New York and New Jersey bombings, as well as one of the components of the explosives attempted to be made by the neo-Nazi terrorist organization Atomwaffen Division in the United States.
