= Tellurium tetraazide =

Names
- IUPAC name Tellurium(IV) tetraazide
- Other names Tellurium tetraazide

Identifiers
3D model (JSmol)	Interactive image
PubChem CID	12146612
- InChI: InChI=1S/N12Te/c1-5-9-13(10-6-2,11-7-3)12-8-4 Key: UGNSLJQACMUEMZ-UHFFFAOYSA-N
- SMILES: [N-]=[N+]=N\[Te](\N=[N+]=[N-])(\N=[N+]=[N-])\N=[N+]=[N-]

Properties
Chemical formula	Te(N_{3})_{4}
Molar mass	295.7 g/mol
Appearance	Yellow solid

Related compounds
Related compounds	[Te(N_{3})_{3}][SbF_{6}]; [Me_{4}N][Te(N_{3})_{5}]
- Except where otherwise noted, data are given for materials in their standard state (at 25 °C [77 °F], 100 kPa). Infobox references

Tellurium tetraazide is an inorganic chemical compound with the formula Te(N_{3})_{4}. It is a highly sensitive explosive and takes the form of a yellow solid. It has been prepared directly as a precipitate of the reaction between tellurium tetrafluoride and trimethylsilyl azide.
