= Dualin =

Dualin is an explosive material based on nitroglycerin and nitrogenized cellulose using sawdust or wood pulp. It is inferior to dynamite and more liable to explosion. Dualin was invented by the Prussian chemist Lieutenant Dittmar in April 1869.
