= Diacetyl peroxide =

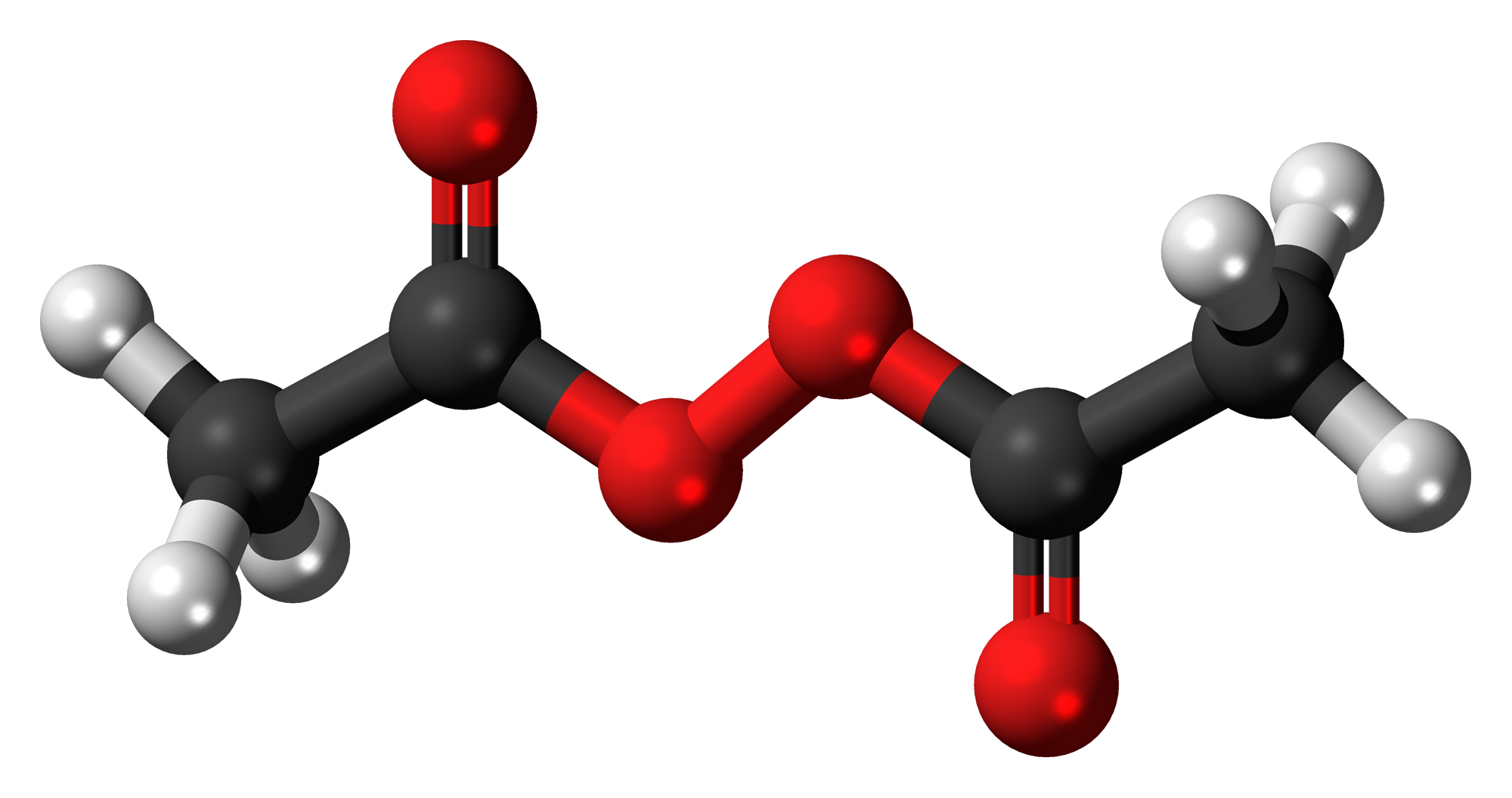

Names
- Preferred IUPAC name Acetic peroxyanhydride
- Other names acetyl peroxide (2:1); diacetyl peroxide; Peroxide, diacetyl; ethanoyl peroxide; acetyl ethaneperoxoate; ethanoyl ethane peroxoate; peracetic acid acetyl ester

Identifiers
CAS Number	110-22-5
3D model (JSmol)	Interactive image
ChemSpider	7749
ECHA InfoCard	100.003.409
EC Number	203-748-8
PubChem CID	8040
UNII	FDU6Y8075A
UN number	2084
CompTox Dashboard (EPA)	DTXSID4059384
- InChI: InChI=1S/C4H6O4/c1-3(5)7-8-4(2)6/h1-2H3 Key: ZQMIGQNCOMNODD-UHFFFAOYSA-N
- SMILES: O=C(OOC(=O)C)C

Properties
Chemical formula	C_{4}H_{6}O_{4}
Molar mass	118.088 g·mol^{−1}
Appearance	Colorless crystals
Density	1.163 g/cm^{3}
Melting point	30 °C (86 °F; 303 K)
Boiling point	121.4 °C (250.5 °F; 394.5 K) at 760 mmHg; 63 °C (145 °F; 336 K) at 21 mmHg
Solubility in water	slight in cold water

Hazards
- Occupational safety and health (OHS/OSH)
Main hazards	Explosive, oxidizer
NFPA 704 (fire diamond)	1 2 4
Flash point	32.2 °C (90.0 °F; 305.3 K) (45 °C [113 °F; 318 K])

Explosive data
Shock sensitivity	Very high / moderate when wet
Friction sensitivity	Very high / moderate when wet
- Except where otherwise noted, data are given for materials in their standard state (at 25 °C [77 °F], 100 kPa). verify (what is ?) Infobox references

Diacetyl peroxide is the organic peroxide with the formula (CH_{3}CO_{2})_{2}. It is a white solid or oily liquid with a sharp odor. As with a number of organic peroxides, it is explosive. It is often used as a solution, e.g., in dimethyl phthalate.

== History ==
Diacetyl peroxide was discovered in 1858 by Benjamin Collins Brodie, who obtained the compound by treating acetic anhydride (which he referred to as "anhydrous acetic acid" from the time of radical theory) with barium peroxide in anhydrous diethyl ether.

== Preparation ==
Diacetyl peroxide forms upon combining hydrogen peroxide and excess acetic anhydride. Peracetic acid is an intermediate.

== Safety ==
Consisting of both an oxidizer, the O-O bond and reducing agents, the C-C and C-H bonds, diacetyl peroxide is shock sensitive and explosive.

The threshold quantity for Process Safety Management per Occupational Safety and Health Administration 1910.119 is 5,000 lb (2,300 kg) if the concentration of the diacetyl peroxide solution is greater than 70%.

There have been reports of detonation of the pure material. The 25% solution also has explosive potential. The crystalline peroxide is especially shock sensitive and a high explosion risk.

Organic peroxides are all prone to exothermic decomposition, potentially leading to explosions and fire.

Contact with liquid causes irritation of the exposed area. If ingested, it irritates the mouth and stomach.
