= Tetraazidomethane =

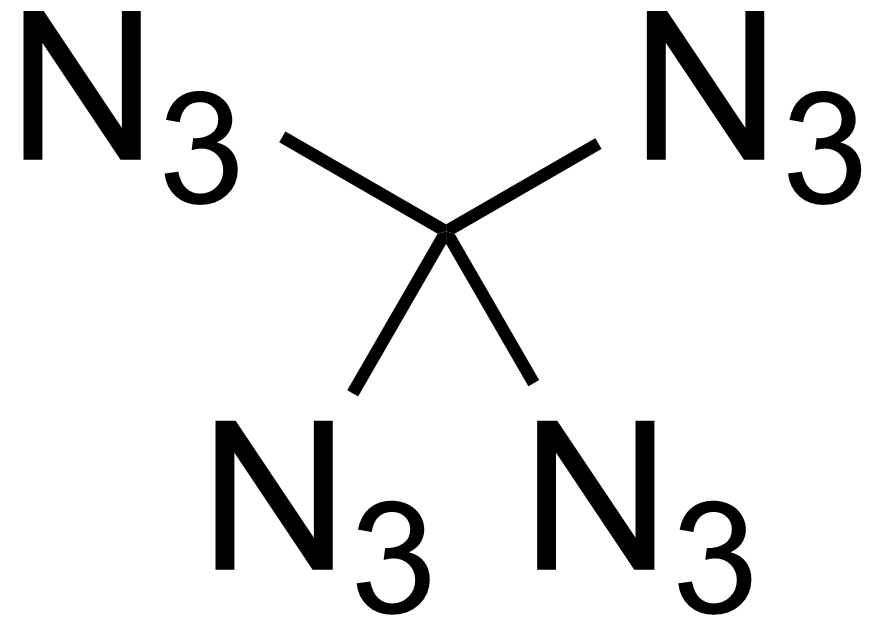
Tetraazidomethane
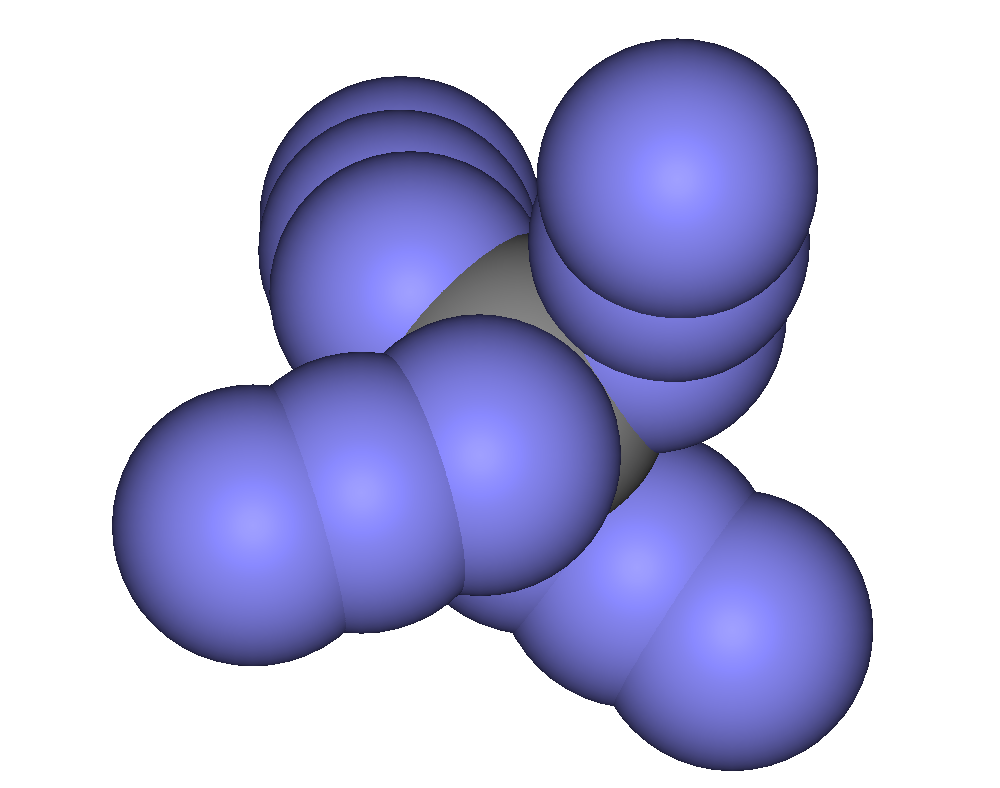
Tetraazidomethane

Names
- Preferred IUPAC name Tetraazidomethane

Identifiers
CAS Number	869384-16-7
3D model (JSmol)	Interactive image
ChemSpider	17219283
PubChem CID	16059578
CompTox Dashboard (EPA)	DTXSID20581604
- InChI: InChI=1S/CN12/c2-10-6-1(7-11-3,8-12-4)9-13-5 Key: PGNZIEKVQCKOBT-UHFFFAOYSA-N; InChI=1/CN12/c2-10-6-1(7-11-3,8-12-4)9-13-5 Key: PGNZIEKVQCKOBT-UHFFFAOYAX
- SMILES: [N-]=[N+]=N\C(\N=[N+]=[N-])(\N=[N+]=[N-])\N=[N+]=[N-]

Properties
Chemical formula	C(N_{3})_{4}
Molar mass	180.095 g·mol^{−1}
Appearance	Colorless liquid
Boiling point	~165 °C (estimate)
- Except where otherwise noted, data are given for materials in their standard state (at 25 °C [77 °F], 100 kPa). verify (what is ?) Infobox references

Tetraazidomethane, C(N_{3})_{4}, is a colorless, highly explosive liquid. Its chemical structure consists of a carbon atom covalently bonded to four azide functional groups.

== Synthesis ==
It was first prepared by Klaus Banert in 2006 by reaction of trichloroacetonitrile with sodium azide.

== Uses ==
As with other polyazides, tetraazidomethane has interest as a high-energy-density material with potential uses in explosives, propellants, or fireworks. Silicon tetraazide is also a known compound.

== Reactions ==
Tetraazidomethane participates in a number of reactions including hydrolysis, cycloaddition reactions with alkenes and alkynes, and reaction with phosphines to form phosphazenes.
