= Kinetite =

Explosive material patented in 1884

Kinetite was an explosive material patented in 1884 by T. Petry and O. Fallenstein, It consisted of nitrobenzene thickened or gelatinised by the addition of some collodion-cotton incorporated with finely ground potassium chlorate and precipitated antimony sulphide. It is an orange coloured, plastic mass, with the characteristic strong smell of nitro-benzol. It was manufactured by dissolving gun cotton in nitrobenzene.

Developed as a safer alternative to dynamite, its manufacture and manipulation were claimed to be without danger, as it required a very high temperature to ignite and, under ordinary circumstances, could not be exploded by heat alone when unconfined. Instead, it detonated only under shock, and then only the part exposed to concussion. Largely manufactured in Germany, it was introduced to Australia in 1885 by Thomas Wilkins. In the same year it was reported to be both £5 per ton cheaper than dynamite, and more efficient for mining operations: In sinking a shaft, a given weight of dynamite enabled 1.7 metres (5 ft 7 in) to be sunk in 114 shifts, and with the same weight of kinetite 1.6 metres (5 ft 3 in) were sunk in 94 shifts.

== Safety ==
It was largely unaffected by short immersion in water, when immersion was prolonged however the chlorate dissolved out, leaving a practically non-explosive residue. However, if exposed to moist and dry air alternately, the chlorate crystallised out on the surfaces rendering the explosive very sensitive.

In testing however it was found to be extremely sensitive to combined friction and percussion, and could be readily ignited by a glancing blow with wood. Found also to be chemically unstable, it was known to ignite spontaneously both in the laboratory and in a magazine. A report of the French commission on the use of explosives in the presence of fire-damp in mines concluded that "The presence of chlorate of potash makes this substance too dangerous, for its use to be recommended."

== Composition ==
The principle of the mixture was the enveloping of each particle of the salts in an elastic jelly composed of hydrocarbons and nitrogen. The jelly additionally supplied material to the explosion.

An 1887 analysis gave the following composition:

| Nitro-benzol | 19.4% |
| Chlorate of potash | 76.9% |
| Sulphide of antimony nitro-cotton | 3.7% |
