= R-salt =

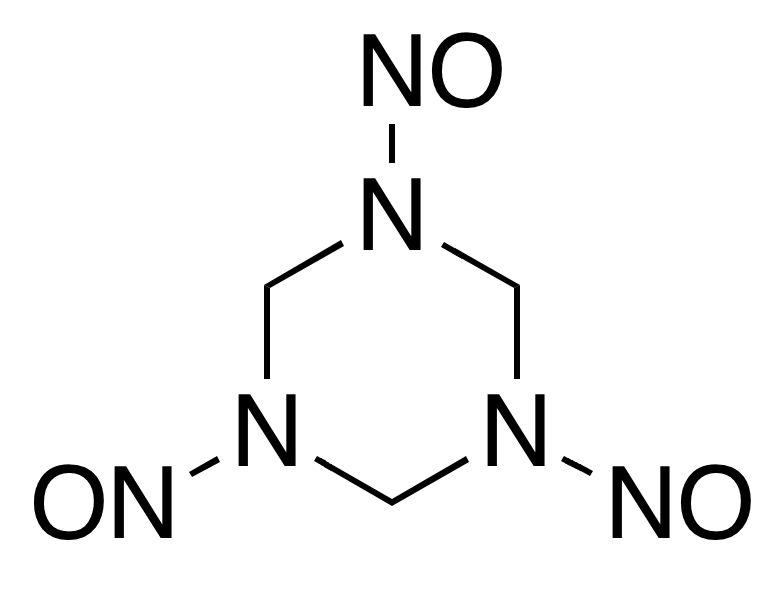

Names
- Other names: TNX; Hexahydro-1,3,5-trinitroso-1,3,5-triazine; Trinitrosotrimethylenetriamine

Identifiers
CAS Number	13980-04-6
3D model (JSmol)	Interactive image
Beilstein Reference	14853
ChEBI	CHEBI:24557
ChEMBL	ChEMBL352556
ChemSpider	24566
ECHA InfoCard	100.034.319
EC Number	237-766-2
PubChem CID	26368
UNII	MK86FR3SN8
CompTox Dashboard (EPA)	DTXSID10161171
- InChI: InChI=1S/C3H6N6O3/c10-4-7-1-8(5-11)3-9(2-7)6-12/h1-3H2 Key: HFWOSHMLDRSIDN-UHFFFAOYSA-N
- SMILES: C1N(CN(CN1N=O)N=O)N=O

Properties
Chemical formula	C_{3}H_{6}N_{6}O_{3}
Molar mass	174.120 g·mol^{−1}

Hazards
- Occupational safety and health (OHS/OSH)
Main hazards	toxic and explosive
- GHS labelling
Pictograms	(GHS06: Toxic)
Signal word	Danger
Hazard statements	H301
Precautionary statements	P264, P270, P301+P316, P321, P330, P405, P501
- Except where otherwise noted, data are given for materials in their standard state (at 25 °C [77 °F], 100 kPa). Infobox references

R-salt (TNX, systematic name hexahydro-1,3,5-trinitroso-1,3,5-triazine) is an explosive organic compound that has been used in terrorist attacks. It is a high explosive that is less sensitive than other compounds of similar availability. It has a similar structure to RDX but with nitrosamine groups replacing the nitroamine groups of RDX. It is also found as a decomposition product of RDX in the environment, such as after RDX detonation. This may be a potential environmental issue as a study concluded that TNX is toxic to earthworm Eisenia fetida. R-salt is synthesized by nitrosation of hexamine.
