= Titanium tetraazide =

Names
- IUPAC name Titanium(IV) tetraazide
- Other names Titanium tetraazide

Identifiers
CAS Number	517874-43-0
3D model (JSmol)	Interactive image
PubChem CID	76529634
- InChI: InChI=1S/4N3.Ti/c4*1-3-2;/q4*-1;+4 Key: UBKFNPJMWUJHGB-UHFFFAOYSA-N
- SMILES: [N-]=[N+]=[N-].[N-]=[N+]=[N-].[N-]=[N+]=[N-].[N-]=[N+]=[N-].[Ti+4]

Properties
Chemical formula	Ti(N_{3})_{4}
Molar mass	215.95 g/mol
- Except where otherwise noted, data are given for materials in their standard state (at 25 °C [77 °F], 100 kPa). Infobox references

Titanium tetraazide is an inorganic chemical compound with the formula Ti(N_{3})_{4}. It is a highly sensitive explosive, and has been prepared from titanium tetrafluoride and trimethylsilyl azide via the corresponding fluoride-azide exchange.

== Properties ==
Titanium tetraazide has been characterized by vibrational spectroscopy and single-crystal X-ray diffraction. The compound was predicted in 2003 to be vibrationally stable, and was expected to have a tetrahedral structures containing linear bond angles, contrasting other metal azides which generally feature bent bond angles. After synthesis in 2004, the resulting titanium tetraazide did not exhibit linear bond angles, as the coordination numbers exceeded 4.
