= Selenium tetraazide =

Names
- IUPAC name Selenium(IV) tetraazide
- Other names Selenium tetraazide

Identifiers
CAS Number	1003019-88-2
3D model (JSmol)	Interactive image
PubChem CID	139263047
- InChI: InChI=1S/N12Se/c1-5-9-13(10-6-2,11-7-3)12-8-4 Key: RAHBAOGFMBUQBX-UHFFFAOYSA-N
- SMILES: [N-]=[N+]=N[Se](N=[N+]=[N-])(N=[N+]=[N-])N=[N+]=[N-]

Properties
Chemical formula	Se(N_{3})_{4}
Molar mass	247.05 g/mol
Appearance	Yellow solid
- Except where otherwise noted, data are given for materials in their standard state (at 25 °C [77 °F], 100 kPa). Infobox references

Selenium tetraazide is an inorganic chemical compound with the formula Se(N_{3})_{4}. It is a highly sensitive explosive, and has been prepared directly from selenium tetrafluoride and trimethylsilyl azide.

== Properties ==
Selenium tetraazide is a yellow solid which precipitates frequently due to its low solubility. The compound is very susceptible to combustion even at low temperatures, and was only found to be stable at −50 °C.
