= Cyanuric triazide =

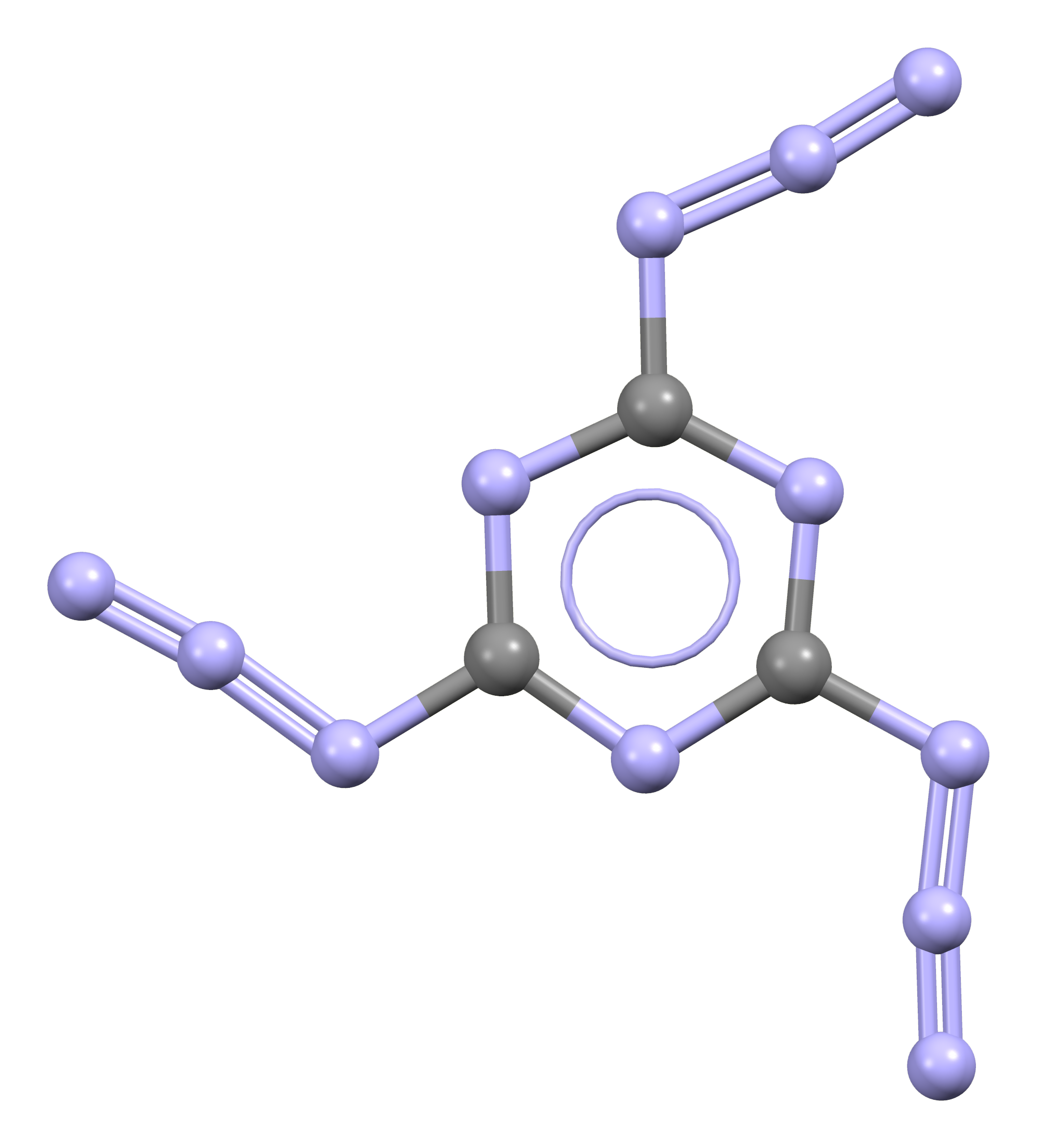

Names
- IUPAC name 2,4,6-Triazido-1,3,5-triazine

Identifiers
CAS Number	5637-83-2
3D model (JSmol)	Interactive image
ChemSpider	20543
PubChem CID	21857
UNII	P5JCR9JM71
CompTox Dashboard (EPA)	DTXSID40971806
- InChI: InChI=1S/C3N12/c4-13-10-1-7-2(11-14-5)9-3(8-1)12-15-6 Key: JKYMSKUDZIJFKI-UHFFFAOYSA-N; InChI=1/C3N12/c4-13-10-1-7-2(11-14-5)9-3(8-1)12-15-6 Key: JKYMSKUDZIJFKI-UHFFFAOYAS
- SMILES: C1(=NC(=NC(=N1)N=[N+]=[N-])N=[N+]=[N-])N=[N+]=[N-]

Properties
Chemical formula	C_{3}N_{12}
Molar mass	204.117 g·mol^{−1}
Appearance	white crystal
Density	1.73 g·cm^{−3}
Melting point	94 °C (201 °F; 367 K)
Boiling point	150 °C (302 °F; 423 K) Decomposition or explosion

Hazards
- Occupational safety and health (OHS/OSH)
Main hazards	Explosive substance
- Flash point
Autoignition temperature	205 °C (401 °F; 478 K)
- Except where otherwise noted, data are given for materials in their standard state (at 25 °C [77 °F], 100 kPa). Infobox references

Cyanuric triazide (C_{3}N_{12} or (NCN_{3})_{3}) is described as an environmentally friendly, low toxicity, and organic primary explosive with a detonation velocity of about 7,300 m s^{−1} and a autoignition temperature of 205 °C.

== Structure ==
The cyanuric triazide molecule exists as a planar triskelion with molecular point group C_{3h}. The 1,3,5-triazine (or cyanuric) ring consists of alternating carbon and nitrogen atoms with C–N bond lengths of 1.334 to 1.336 Å. The distance from the center of the ring to each ring carbon atom is 1.286 Å, while the corresponding distance to ring nitrogens is 1.379 Å. Azide groups are linked to the carbon atoms on the cyanuric ring by single bonds with an interatomic distance of 1.399 Å.

== Synthesis ==
Cyanuric triazide can be synthesized via the nucleophilic aromatic substitution of cyanuric trichloride with an excess of sodium azide in heated acetone. The white crystals can then be purified via recrystallization from −20 °C toluene.

== Decomposition reactions ==
This white polycrystalline solid was found to be stable under standard conditions but is extremely shock sensitive causing it to violently decompose when ground with a mortar. The thermodynamic properties of cyanuric triazide were studied using bomb calorimetry with a combustion enthalpy (H) of 2234 kJ mol^{−1} under oxidizing conditions and 740 kJ mol^{−1} otherwise. The former value is comparable to the military explosive RDX, (C_{3}N_{3})(NO_{3})_{3}H_{6}, but is not put into use due to its less than favorable stability. Melting point examination showed a sharp melting range to clear liquid at 94–95 °C, gas evolution at 155 °C, orange to brown solution discoloration at 170 °C, orange-brown solidification at 200 °C and rapid decomposition at 240 °C. The rapid decomposition at 240 °C results from the formation of elemental carbon as graphite and the formation of nitrogen gas.
