= 4-Dimethylaminophenylpentazole =

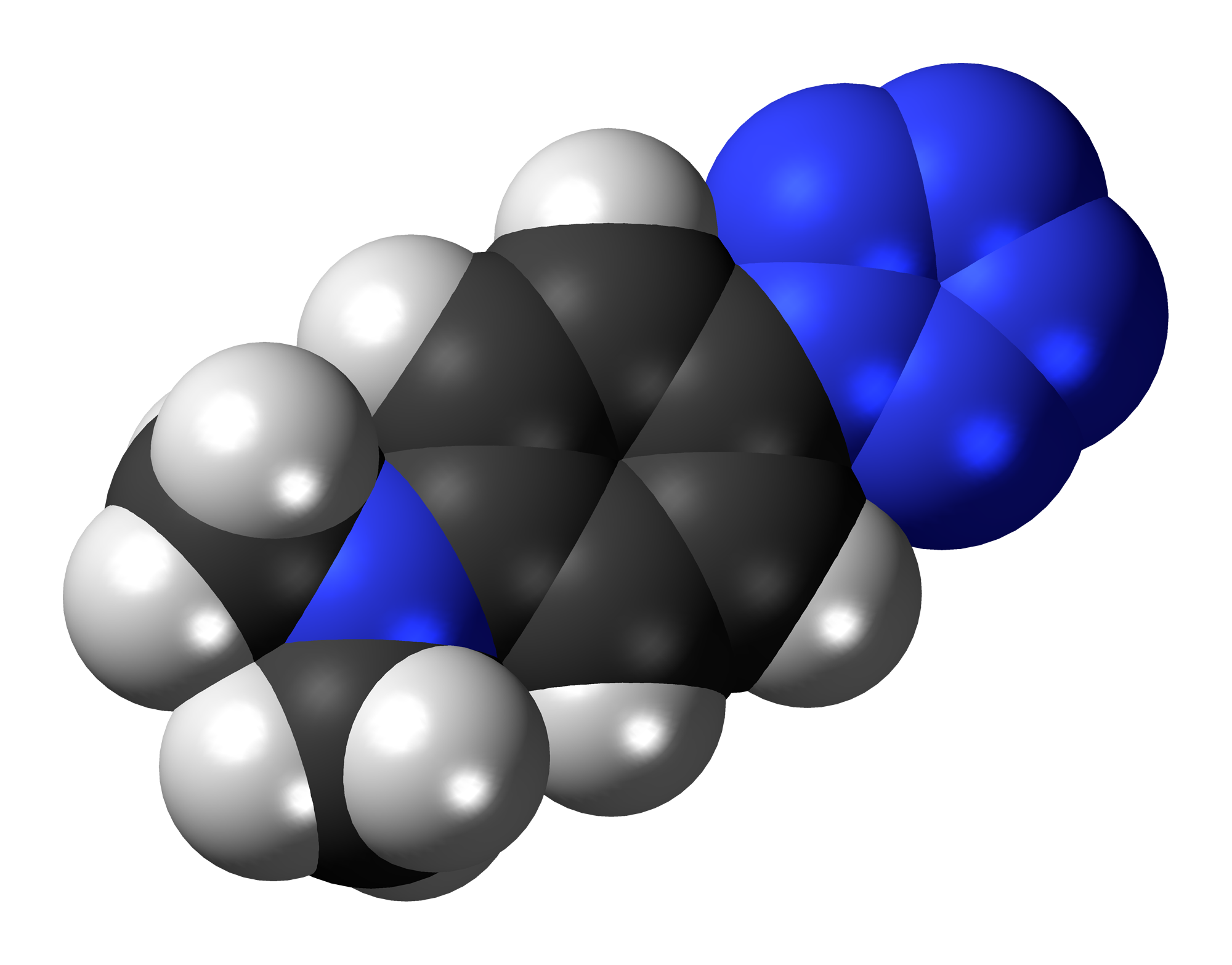

Names
- Preferred IUPAC name N,N-Dimethyl-4-(1H-pentazol-1-yl)aniline

Identifiers
CAS Number	58402-54-3
3D model (JSmol)	Interactive image; Interactive image
ChemSpider	10447638
PubChem CID	23279314
UNII	C5ZCD4UV53
CompTox Dashboard (EPA)	DTXSID60632462
- InChI: InChI=1S/C8H10N6/c1-13(2)7-3-5-8(6-4-7)14-11-9-10-12-14/h3-6H,1-2H3 Key: OICBARXSRMXZPL-UHFFFAOYSA-N
- SMILES: n1nnnn1-c2ccc(N(C)C)cc2; CN(C)c1ccc(cc1)n2nnnn2

Properties
Chemical formula	C_{8}H_{10}N_{6}
Molar mass	190.210 g·mol^{−1}
- Except where otherwise noted, data are given for materials in their standard state (at 25 °C [77 °F], 100 kPa). verify (what is ?) Infobox references

4-Dimethylaminophenylpentazole is an unstable, explosive compound that contains the rare pentazole ring, which is composed of five nitrogen atoms. The electron donating effect of the 4-dimethylamino substituent on the phenyl ring makes this compound one of the more stable of the phenylpentazoles. At room temperature, its chemical half-life is only a few hours, although storage is possible at cryogenic temperatures. The compound was first prepared in 1956 along with other substituted phenylpentazoles. Studies have been conducted on various other derivatives, though necessarily limited by the instability of these compounds. Some more highly substituted derivatives, such as 2,6-dihydroxy-4-dimethylaminophenylpentazole, are slightly more stable but conversely, more difficult to make. Current research has focused on forming transition metal complexes of these pentazole derivatives, as the pentazole ring should be stabilised by bonding to the metal centre.
