= Azidotetrazolate =

Azidotetrazolate (CN_{7}^{−}) is an anion which forms a highly explosive series of salts. The ion is made by removing a proton from 5-azido-1H-tetrazole. The molecular structure contains a five-membered ring with four nitrogen atoms, and an azido side chain connected to the carbon atom. Several salts exist, but they are unstable and spontaneously explode. For example, the rubidium, potassium and caesium salts are so unstable that they explode while crystallizing.

Azidotetrazolates are under investigation for use as bullet propellant, rocket propellants and high explosives. The nitrogen base compounds have the advantage of being "green explosives", meaning that their waste products are safe. Amongst the tetrazolates, they have the highest nitrogen fraction.

== Properties ==
Different stimuli can set off explosions. Possibilities include impact, friction, sparks or heat. Guanidinium azidotetrazolate could be melted to an ionic liquid at 100°C, but would decompose smoothly at 159°. Sodium azidotetrazolate explodes when the temperature reaches 155°C.

The CNNNN ring in azidotetrazolate is planar and aromatic. The NNN side chain is attached to the carbon atom, and bent at the first nitrogen so that it is roughly parallel to the ring.

The base acids, 5-azido-1H-tetrazole and 5-azido-2H-tetrazole both can exist. The 1H version has a hydrogen atom bonded to a nitrogen atom next to the carbon. It is the stable form in solids and solutions in polar liquids. This is explained by a favourable hydrogen bond, and a greater dipole moment. The 2H version with hydrogen attached in the second nitrogen from the carbon is purportedly more stable in the gas phase.

== Formation ==
The azidotetrazolate ion can be made from cyanogen bromide and sodium azide in water:

BrCN + 2NaN_{3} → N_{4}CN_{3}^{−} + Na^{+} + NaBr

== Salts ==
formula	name	molecular weight	density	structure	unit cell dimension Å	cell volume	formula per cell	Specific impulse	melt °C	decompose °C	CAS
NH_{4}CN_{7}	Ammonium azidotetrazolate	128.12	1.608	monoclinic	a=3.9103 b=6.9140 c=9.9127 β=99.177°	264.57	2	248		157	35038-47-2
N_{2}H_{5}CN_{7}	Hydrazinium azidotetrazolate	143.14	1.568	monoclinic	a=10.8114 b=7.4641 c=7.6676 β=101.437°	606.47	4	265		136	
CN_{3}H_{6}CN_{7}	Guanidinium azidotetrazolate semihydrate	358.35	1.546	monoclinic	a=9.5374 b=15.3120 c=10.5731 β=94.361	1539.6	4		100	159	
CN_{4}H_{7}CN_{7}	Aminoguanidinium azidotetrazolate	185.19	1.524	triclinic	a=9.7652 b=9.7803 c=10.0434 α=71.327° β=74.399° γ=63.962°	807.2	4	228			
NH_{3}OHCN_{7}	Hydroxylammonium azidotetrazolate	144.12	1.649	monoclinic	a=3.677 b=20.885 c=7.641 β=98.367	580.5	4				
LiCN_{7}•H_{2}O	Lithium azidotetrazolate monohydrate	135.03	1.683	monoclinic	a=8.9207 b=4.6663 c=12.8648 β=95.608	532.96	4				
NaCN_{7}•H_{2}O	Sodium azidotetrazolate monohydrate	151.09	1.743	monoclinic	a=11.203 b=7.138 c=14.409 β=91.630°	1151.8	8		explode	155	35038-45-0
KCN_{7}	Potassium azidotetrazolate	149.18	1.917	monoclinic	a=9.7759 b=6.2990 c=8.4533 β=96.720°	516.96	4				
RbCN_{7}	Rubidium azidotetrazolate	195.12	Unknown; all attempts at isolation terminated by detonation of solution.							<25	
CsCN_{7}	Caesium azidotetrazolate	242.99	2.810	orthorhombic	a=4.3082 b=7.1345 c=18.6869	574.38	4				
3Ca(CN_{7})_{2}•16H_{2}O	Calcium azidotetrazolate	1068.98	1.657	monoclinic	a=24.448 b=6.616 c=28.057 β=109.246°	4285	4				
AgCN_{7}	Silver azidotetrazolate										
HCN_{7}	5-Azido-1H-tetrazole	111.07	1.72						75	165	35038-46-1

== Related ==
Chemicals related to the azidotetrazolate anion include 1-diazidocarbamoyl-5-azidotetrazole with the same percentage of nitrogen.
