= Explosive antimony =

Allotrope of antimony that explodes when exposed to friction or heat

Explosive antimony is an allotrope of the chemical element antimony that is so sensitive to shock that it explodes when scratched or subjected to sudden heating. The allotrope was first described in 1855.

Chemists form the allotrope through electrolysis of a concentrated solution of antimony trichloride in hydrochloric acid, which forms an amorphous glass. This glass contains significant amounts of halogen impurity at its boundaries.

The allotrope had an onion-like layered structure, centered on the cathode. The layers are thin, at a rate of 2000-3000 per cm (5.0-3.3 μm).

When it explodes, the allotrope releases 24 calories (100 J) per gram (2.9 kcal/mol (12 kJ/mol)). White fumes of antimony trichloride are produced and the elemental antimony reverts to its metallic form.
