= Danubit =

Danubit was an industrial plastic explosive produced by the Slovak company Istrochem. It had been used for many decades intended primarily as a rock blasting explosive for surface and underground mass mining of mineral raw materials. Underwater blasting applications were possible as well.

The producer of Danubit, Istrochem, is a chemical company founded in 1847 by Alfred Nobel in Bratislava, Slovakia. The production of explosives ceased, when part of the company was acquired by the Czech company Explosia a.s., the producer of Semtex in 2009.

== Characteristics ==
Appearance	reddish plastic mass
Velocity of detonation	min. 6000 m/s
Explosion temperature	min. 3130 °C
Impact sensitivity	min. 3.5 J (2 kg, 50%)
Explosive effect by Trauzl	min. 380 cm^{3}
Shelf life	6 months

== See also ==
- Dynamite
