= Copper(II) azide =

Chemical compound

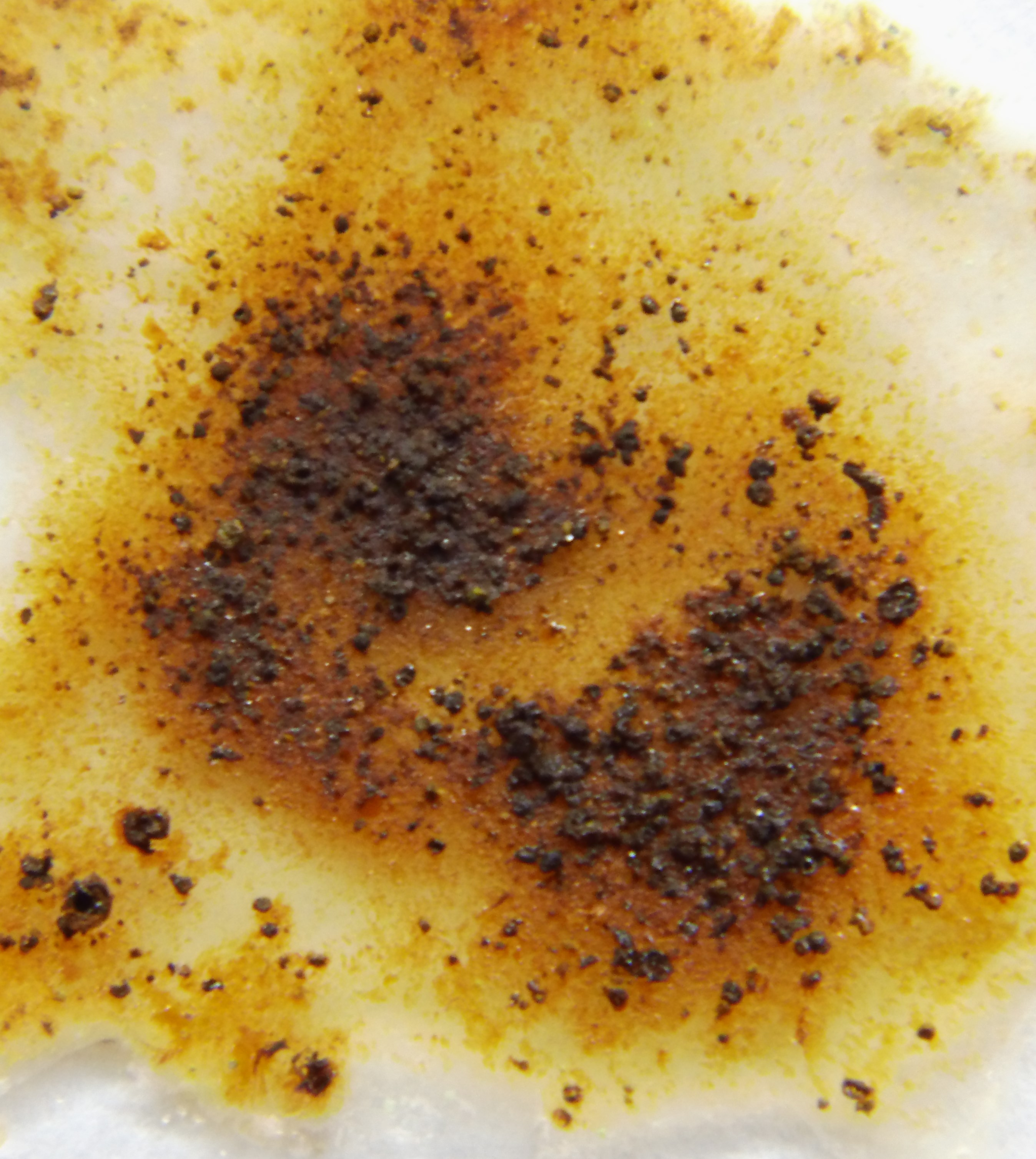

Names
- IUPAC name Copper(II) azide
- Other names Cupric azide

Identifiers
CAS Number	14215-30-6
3D model (JSmol)	Interactive image; Interactive image
ChemSpider	21106430
PubChem CID	57348354
UNII	43SX07O4UP
CompTox Dashboard (EPA)	DTXSID00931365
- InChI: InChI=1S/Cu.2N3/c;2*1-3-2/q+2;2*-1 Key: SXHYOTRZGGGMEV-UHFFFAOYSA-N; InChI=1/Cu.2N3/c;2*1-3-2/q+2;2*-1 Key: SXHYOTRZGGGMEV-UHFFFAOYAL
- SMILES: [N-]=[N+]=[N-][Cu+2][N-]=[N+][N-]; [Cu+2].[N-]=[N+]=[N-].[N-]=[N+]=[N-]

Properties
Chemical formula	Cu(N_{3})_{2}
Molar mass	147.586 g/mol
Appearance	brown orthorhombic crystals
Density	2.6 g/cm^{3}
Melting point	Explodes when heated

Hazards
- GHS labelling
Pictograms	(GHS01: Explosive) (GHS06: Toxic)
Signal word	Danger
NFPA 704 (fire diamond)	3 0 4
- NIOSH (US health exposure limits)
PEL (Permissible)	TWA 1 mg/m^{3} (as Cu)
REL (Recommended)	TWA 1 mg/m^{3} (as Cu)
IDLH (Immediate danger)	TWA 100 mg/m^{3} (as Cu)

Related compounds
Other cations	Lead(II) azide Silver azide Sodium azide
- Except where otherwise noted, data are given for materials in their standard state (at 25 °C [77 °F], 100 kPa). verify (what is ?) Infobox references

Copper(II) azide is a medium density explosive with the molecular formula Cu(N_{3})_{2}.

== Uses ==
Copper azide is very explosive and is too sensitive for any practical use unless handled in solution.

== Preparation ==
Copper azide can be prepared by a metathesis reaction between water-soluble sources of Cu^{2+} and azide ions. (Spectator ions omitted in reaction below).

Cu^{2+} + 2 N^{−}_{3} → Cu(N_{3})_{2}

It can be destroyed by concentrated nitric acid to form non-explosive products, these being nitrogen, nitrogen oxides, and copper(II) nitrate.
