= Fluorine perchlorate =

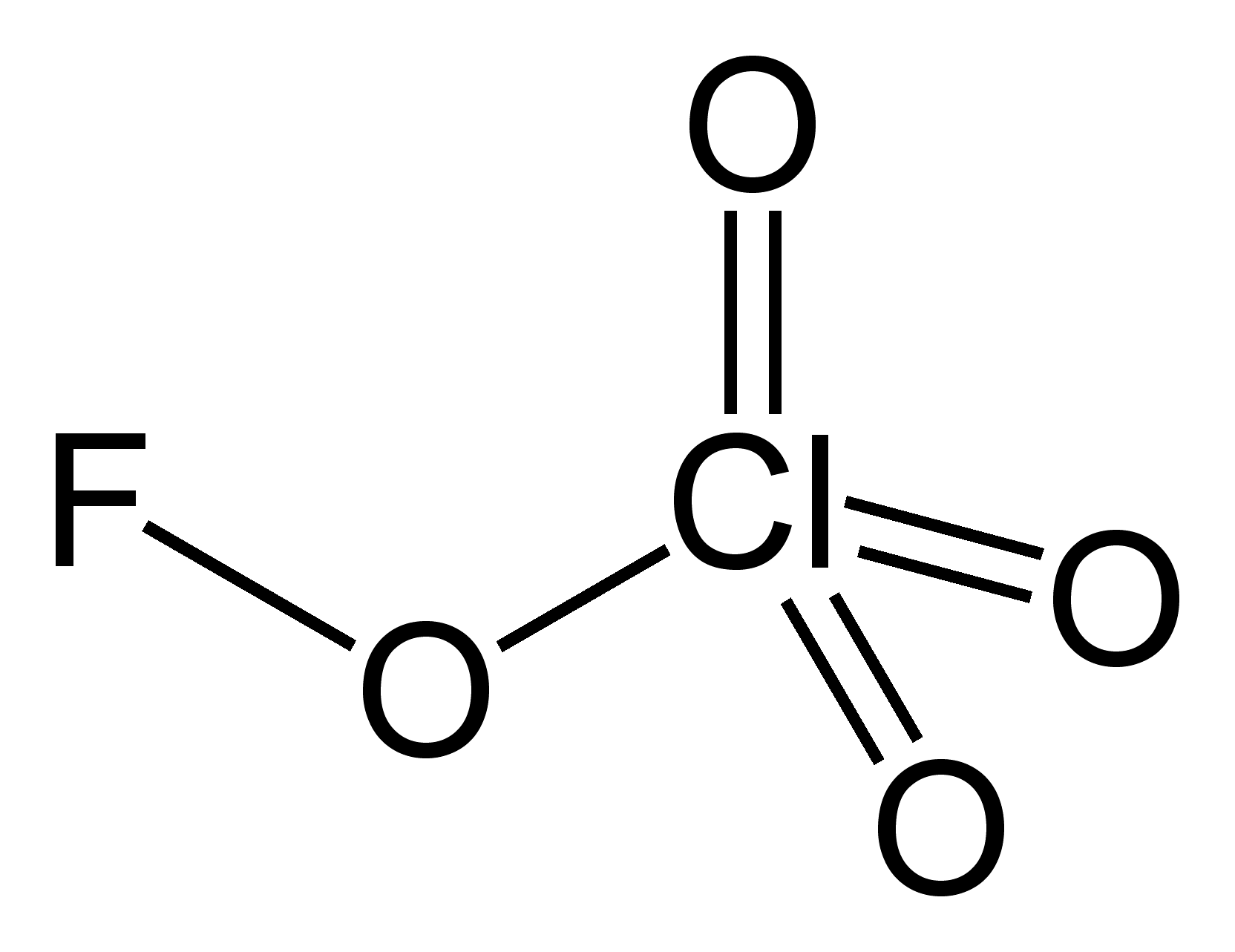

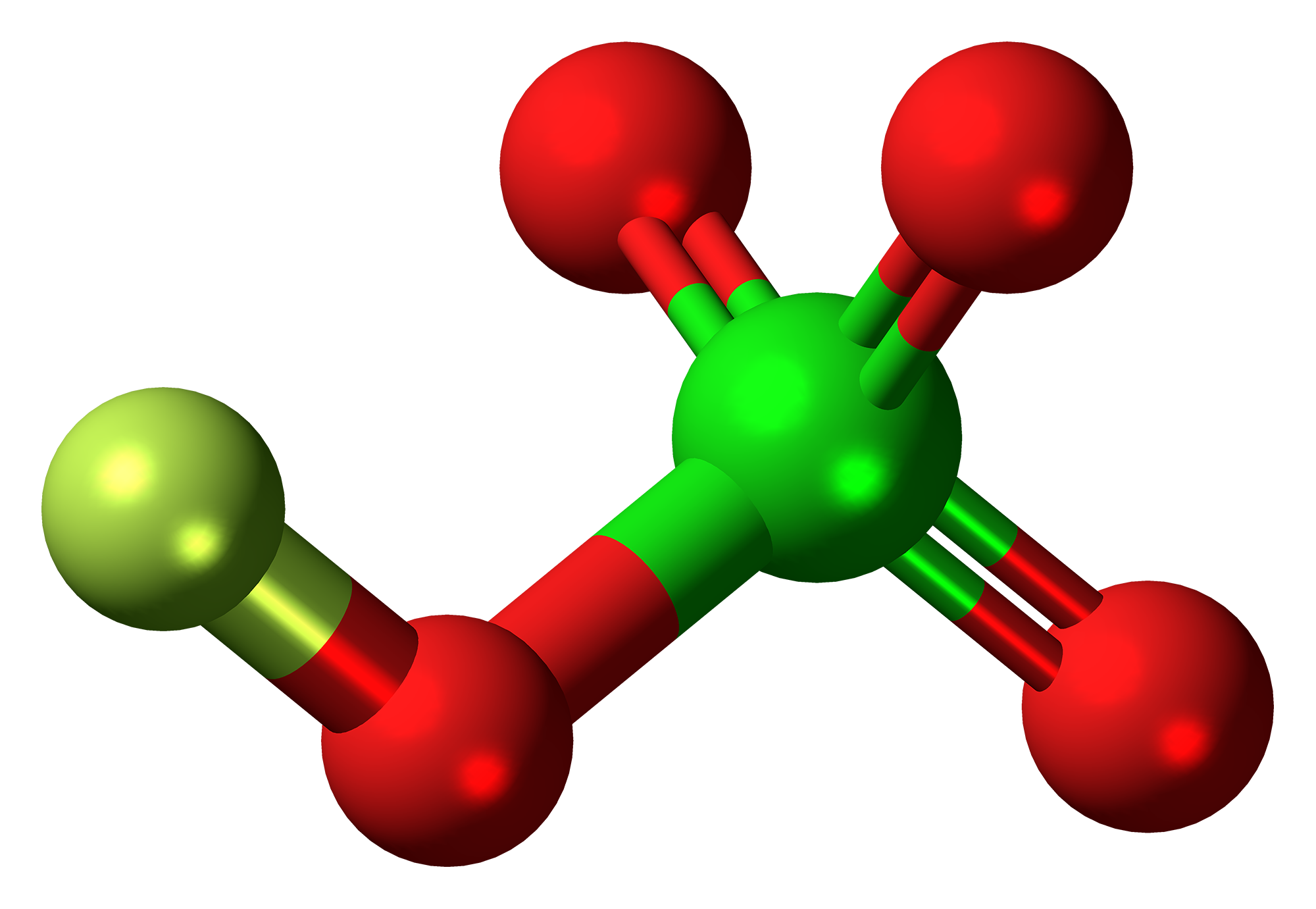

Names
- IUPAC name Perchloryl hypofluorite
- Other names Fluorine perchlorate

Identifiers
| CAS Number | 10049-03-3 |
| 3D model (JSmol) | Interactive image |
| ChemSpider | 10326178 |
| PubChem CID | 13022374 |
| UNII | M5BON9S68S |
| CompTox Dashboard (EPA) | DTXSID40515441 |
- InChI: InChI=1S/ClFO4/c2-6-1(3,4)5 Key: DRFVFUCINMEBEQ-UHFFFAOYSA-N; InChI=1/ClFO4/c2-6-1(3,4)5 Key: DRFVFUCINMEBEQ-UHFFFAOYAO
- SMILES: FOCl(O)(O)O

Properties
| Chemical formula | FClO_{4} |
| Melting point | −167.3 °C (−269.1 °F; 105.8 K) |
| Boiling point | −16 °C (3 °F; 257 K) |

Thermochemistry
| Std enthalpy of formation (Δ_{f}H^{⦵}_{298}) | 9 kcal/mol |

Hazards
- Occupational safety and health (OHS/OSH)
| Main hazards | Highly explosive gas |
- Except where otherwise noted, data are given for materials in their standard state (at 25 °C [77 °F], 100 kPa). verify (what is ?) Infobox references

Fluorine perchlorate, also called perchloryl hypofluorite is the rarely encountered chemical compound of fluorine, chlorine, and oxygen with the chemical formula ClO_{4}F or FOClO_{3}. It is an extremely unstable gas that explodes spontaneously and has a penetrating odor.

== Synthesis ==
One synthesis uses fluorine and perchloric acid, though the action of ClF_{5} on water is another method.

F_{2} + HClO_{4} → FClO_{4} + HF

Another method of synthesis involves the thermal decomposition of tetrafluoroammonium perchlorate, NF_{4}ClO_{4}, which yields very pure FClO_{4} that may be manipulated and frozen without explosions.

NF_{4}ClO_{4} → NF_{3} + FClO_{4}

== Structure ==
Fluorine perchlorate is not analogous to perchloric acid because the fluorine atom is more electronegative than oxygen. It contains an oxygen atom in a rare oxidation state of 0 due to the electronegativity of oxygen, which is higher than that of chlorine but lower than that of fluorine.

== Safety ==
FClO_{4} has a very dangerous and unpredictable series of reactions associated with it, as a covalent perchlorate (chlorine in the +7 oxidation state) and a compound featuring a very sensitive O-F single bond. Small amounts of reducing agents, such as organic compounds, can trigger explosive detonation. Products of these decomposition reactions could include oxygen halides, interhalogen compounds, and other hazardous substances.

Accidental synthesis is possible if precursors are carelessly mixed. Like similar covalent fluorides and perchlorates, it needs to be handled with extreme caution.

== Reaction ==
FClO_{4} is a strong oxidant and it reacts with the iodide ion:

FOClO_{3} + 2 I^{−} → ClO^{−}_{4} + F^{−} + I_{2}

FClO_{4} can also react with tetrafluoroethylene:

CF_{2}=CF_{2} + FOClO_{3} → CF_{3}CF_{2}OClO_{3}

It may be a radical addition reaction.
