= Cadmium azide =

Names
- IUPAC name Cadmium diazide
- Other names Cadmium(II) azide

Identifiers
CAS Number	14215-29-3
3D model (JSmol)	Interactive image
ChemSpider	23254970
PubChem CID	57348353
CompTox Dashboard (EPA)	DTXSID40721621
- InChI: InChI=1S/Cd.2N3/c;2*1-3-2/q+2;2*-1 Key: DOXDQPGIFAJLKV-UHFFFAOYSA-N
- SMILES: [N-]=[N+]=[N-].[N-]=[N+]=[N-].[Cd+2]

Properties
Chemical formula	Cd(N_{3})_{2}
Molar mass	196.46 g/mol
Appearance	colorless

Hazards
- GHS labelling
Pictograms	(GHS01: Explosive)
Signal word	Danger
- Except where otherwise noted, data are given for materials in their standard state (at 25 °C [77 °F], 100 kPa). Infobox references

Cadmium azide is an inorganic chemical compound with the formula Cd(N_{3})_{2}. It is composed of the cadmium cation (Cd^{2+}) and the azide anions (N^{−}_{3}).

== Properties ==
Cadmium azide is colorless and crystalline powder. It is highly sensitive to pressure, and is explosive akin to most other azides. It has a high temperature resistance, and also possesses good detonation ability. Because of this, cadmium azide is expected to be applicable within microinitiating systems.
