= Mercury nitride =

Inorganic compound

In chemistry, mercury nitrides are chemical compounds that contain mercury cations and nitride anions. Binary mercury nitrides, e.g. Hg_{3}N_{2}, are not well characterized and are probably unstable in the condensed phase under ordinary conditions. A nitride of mercury has been reported in the form of [Hg_{2}N](NO_{3}). This reddish solid adopts a network structure consisting of NHg_{4} tetrahedra linked by nitrate ligands.
