= Sensitivity (explosives) =

Degree to which an explosive can be set off by impact, heat, or friction

In explosives engineering, sensitivity refers to the degree to which an explosive can be initiated by impact, heat, or friction. Current in-use standard methods of mechanical (impact and friction) sensitivity determination differ by the sample preparation (constant mass or volume is usually used; pile or pressed pellet), sample arrangement (confined/unconfined sample etc), instrument type, go/not go criteria, and the statistical analysis of results.

Sensitivity, stability and brisance are three of the most significant properties of explosives that affect their use and application. All explosive compounds have a certain amount of energy required to initiate, analogous to the minimum ignition energy of fuel-air mixtures. If an explosive is too sensitive, it may go off accidentally. A safer explosive is less sensitive and will not explode if accidentally dropped or mishandled. However, such explosives are more difficult to initiate intentionally.

== Types of sensitivity ==
The sensitivity of explosives is characterized by the figure of insensitivity, a measure of the probability of a material to initiate or detonate in response to quantities of external stimuli (usually impact, friction, and electrostatic discharge are considered):

- impact insensitivity is most commonly measured with a drop-weight tower;
- friction insensitivity has several tests including the Allegany Ballistics Laboratory (ABL) and Bundesanstalt für Materialforschung und -prüfung (BAM) friction tests;
- ESD insensitivity is measured with varying energies delivered via capacitors.

== Explosive train ==
Less sensitive explosives can be initiated by smaller quantities of more sensitive explosives, called primers or detonators, such as blasting caps. The use of increasingly less sensitive explosive materials to create an escalating chain reaction is known as an explosive train, initiation sequence, or firing train.

== Classifications ==
High explosives are conventionally subdivided into two explosives classes, differentiated by sensitivity:

- Primary explosives are extremely sensitive to mechanical shock, friction, and heat, to which they will respond by burning rapidly or detonating.
- Secondary explosives, also called base explosives, are relatively insensitive to shock, friction, and heat.

The dataset for 150 CHNOFCl energetic compounds is available.

== Sources ==
- EPA (2024). "Revisions to Standards for the Open Burning/Open Detonation of Waste Explosives" (PDF). : Environmental Protection Agency.
