= Silicon tetraazide =

Chemical compound

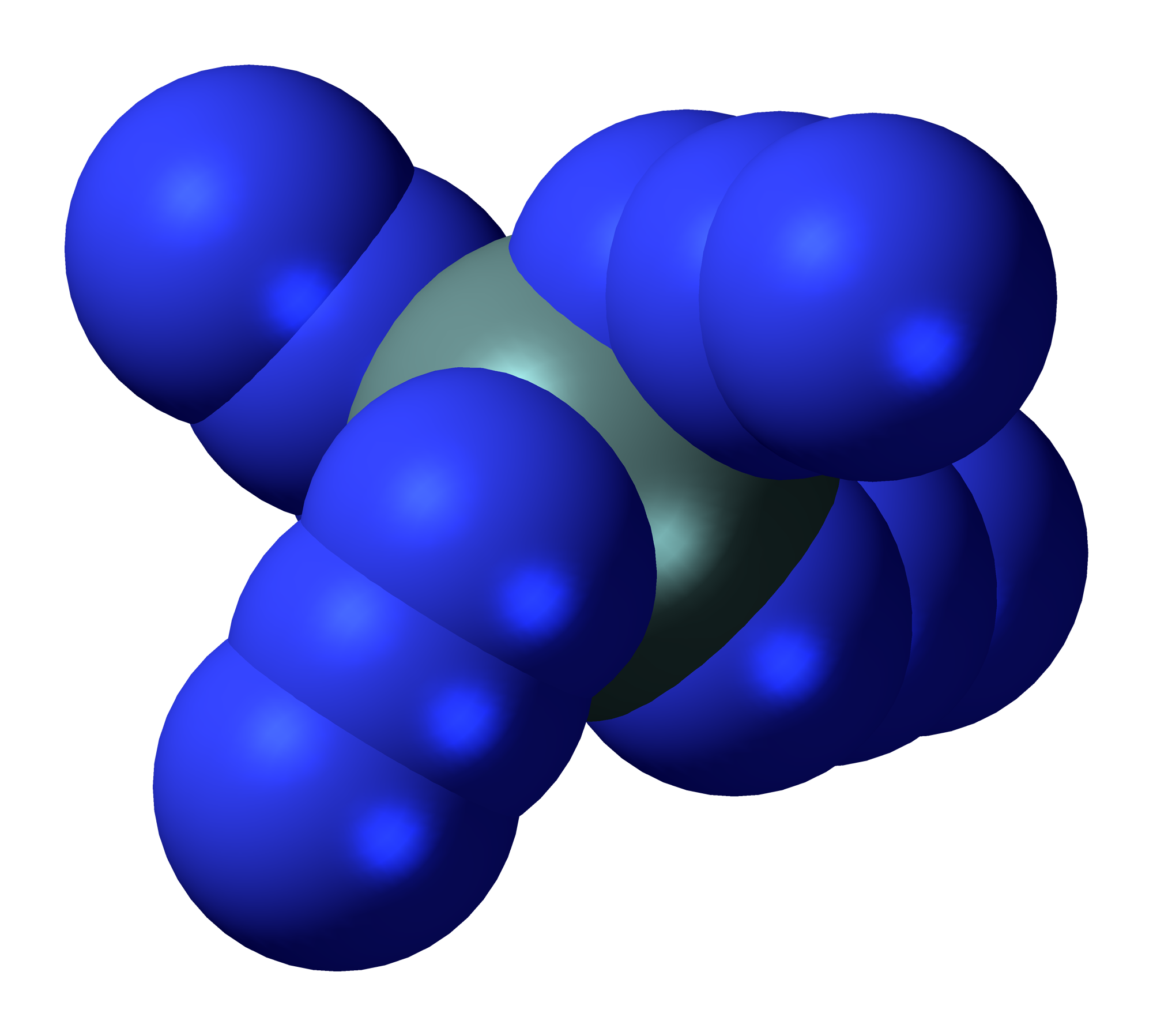

Names
- Other names Tetraazidosilane

Identifiers
| CAS Number | 27890-58-0 |
| 3D model (JSmol) | Interactive image |
| ChemSpider | 35764491 |
| PubChem CID | 57461327 |
| CompTox Dashboard (EPA) | DTXSID701029721 |
- InChI: InChI=1S/N12Si/c1-5-9-13(10-6-2,11-7-3)12-8-4 Key: SZJFGTWFLXTOHF-UHFFFAOYSA-N
- SMILES: [N-]=[N+]=N[Si](N=[N+]=[N-])(N=[N+]=[N-])N=[N+]=[N-]

Properties
| Chemical formula | Si(N_{3})_{4} |
| Molar mass | 196.1659 g/mol |
| Appearance | White crystals |
| Melting point | 212 °C (414 °F; 485 K) |
| Solubility in water | Reacts |
- Except where otherwise noted, data are given for materials in their standard state (at 25 °C [77 °F], 100 kPa). Infobox references

Silicon tetraazide is a thermally unstable binary compound of silicon and nitrogen with a nitrogen content of 85.7% (by molar mass). This high-energy compound combusts spontaneously and can only be studied in a solution. A further coordination to a six-fold coordinated structure such as a hexaazidosilicate ion [Si(N_{3})_{6}]^{2−} or as an adduct with bidentate ligands Si(N_{3})_{4}·L_{2} will result in relatively stable, crystalline solids that can be handled at room temperature.

== Preparation ==
Silicon tetraazide is synthesized by conversion of silicon tetrachloride with sodium azide in benzene.

The reaction of silicon tetrachloride with an excess of sodium azide at room temperature in acetonitrile will result in the formation of sodium hexaazidosilicate (Na_{2}[Si(N_{3})_{6}]) which by adding ligands such as 2,2′-bipyridine and 1,10-phenanthroline will result in stable silicon tetraazide adducts. Other bases such as pyridine and tetramethylethylenediamine will not react with the hexaazidosilicate ion.

Another preparation of a bis(triphenylphosphine)iminium hexaazidosilicate salt [(Ph_{3}P)_{2}N]_{2}[Si(N_{3})_{6}] is possible by conversion of bis(triphenylphosphine)iminium azide [(Ph_{3}P)_{2}N]N_{3} with silicon tetrachloride in acetonitrile, where Ph is phenyl.

== Properties ==
Silicon tetraazide is a white crystalline compound that will detonate at even 0 °C. The pure compound, and also silicon chloride triazide SiCl(N_{3})_{3} and silicon dichloride diazide SiCl_{2}(N_{3})_{2} contaminated samples, can detonate spontaneously without clear cause. The compound is susceptible to hydrolysis. It is soluble in diethylether and benzene.

The addition compound with 2,2′-bipyridine is much more stable. A melting point of 212 °C with a melting enthalpy of 110 J/g is recorded. The DSC measurement shows at 265 °C a sharp exothermic reaction with an enthalpy of −2400 J/g. Similar results are found for the addition compound with 1,10-phenanthroline. As the hemiacetonitrile solvatated isolated compound expels solvent at 100 °C, and shows then in the DSC measurement from 240 °C onwards a strong exothermic reaction with a generated heat of 2300 J/g. The enthalpies are higher than that of sodium azide with −800 J/g, but still lower than the values encountered with classic explosives such as RDX with −4500 J/g. The addition compounds are stable in solution. It can be concluded from IR-spectroscopy and proton NMR data that no dissociation occurs in silicon tetraazide and 2,2'-bipyridine or for example 1,10-phenanthroline. The bis(triphenylphosphino)iminium hexaazidosilicate salt [(Ph_{3}P)_{2}N]_{2}[Si(N_{3})_{6}] on the other hand is relatively stable. The compound melts at 214 °C and shows in the DSC measurement at 250 °C a reaction. One mass spectrometry coupled thermogravimetric analysis investigation indicated as reaction products nitrogen, silicon tetraazide and hydrazoic acid.

== Applications ==
A practical application of free silicon tetraazide is unlikely due to the high instability. In solution the compound has potential uses as raw material for nitrogen-rich materials. One application as reagent in the manufacture of polyolefins has been patented. The stabilized adducts can serve as energetic compounds as a replacement for lead azide.
