= Shock sensitivity =

Sensitivity of an explosive to shock

Shock sensitivity is a comparative measure of the sensitivity to sudden compression (by impact or blast) of an explosive chemical compound. Determination of the shock sensitivity of a material intended for practical use is one important aspect of safety testing of explosives.

A variety of tests and indices are in use, of which one of the more common is the Rotter Impact Test, with results expressed as FoI (Figure of Insensitivity.) In addition, various "gap tests" are used to measure sensitivity to blast shock.

== Sensitivities vary widely ==
A few materials such as nitrogen triiodide cannot be touched at all without detonating, and so are of purely academic interest. Some other compounds with a high sensitivity to shock, such as nitroglycerin and acetone peroxide, may detonate from a firm jolt and so cannot be legally transported in pure form. Acetone peroxide is often used by amateurs and terrorists as a means to detonate other explosives as well as acting as the main blasting agent, often resulting in injuries or death to those who underestimate its sensitivity. A number of methods are known to desensitize nitroglycerine so that it can be transported for medical uses, and it is also incorporated into other less sensitive explosives, such as dynamites and gelignites.

Many practical commercial materials of intermediate sensitivity, such as gelignites and water gel explosives, can be safely handled as they will not explode from casual shocks such as being dropped or lightly knocked by a tool. However, they may explode if struck forcefully by a metal tool, and would certainly explode in the barrel if they were used in an artillery shell. Reliable initiation of such materials requires the small explosion of a detonator. Apart from this another explosive material such as Armstrong's mixture is also used in commercial markets and even sold to the public in the form of fireworks, cap guns and party poppers.

== Figure of insensitivity ==
Figure of insensitivity (F of I, FoI) for impact is an inverse scale of measure of the impact sensitivity of an explosive substance. In this particular context the term 'Insensitivity' refers to the likelihood of initiation/detonation by impact, friction, electrostatic discharge, application of flame, etc. It is a quantitative measure of the level of stimulus required to cause explosive decomposition.

The figure of insensitivity is determined from impact testing, typically using a drop-weight tower. In this test, a small sample of the explosive is placed on a small steel anvil which is slotted into a recess in the base of the drop tower. A cylindrical, 1 kilogram steel weight (mounted inside a tube to accurately guide its descent to the impact point in the centre of the anvil) is then dropped onto the test specimen from a measured height. The specimen is monitored both during and after this process to determine whether initiation occurs. This test is repeated many times, varying the drop height according to a prescribed method. Various heights are used, starting with a small distance (e.g. 10 cm) and then progressively increasing it to as high as 3 metres. The series of drop heights and whether initiation occurred are analysed statistically to determine the drop height which has a 50% likelihood of initiating the explosives. The intention of these tests is to develop safety policies/rules that will govern the design, manufacturing, handling and storage of the explosive and any munitions containing it.

A reference standard sample of RDX is currently used to calibrate the drop tower, so that the drop height to produce 50% likelihood of initiation in this material is measured and recorded. The drop height required to initiate other explosives can then be related to the RDX standard so that a ready comparison of impact sensitivity between different explosives can be made. By convention, explosives having a 50% initiation drop height equal to that of RDX are given an F of I of 80.

The scale was originally defined using TNT as the reference standard, with TNT having, by definition, an F of I of exactly 100. On this original scale, RDX yielded an F of I of around 80. Following World War II, when more complex explosive compositions replaced pure TNT as the most common energetic component of weapon systems, RDX was adopted as the reference standard.

== See also ==
- Activation energy
- Catastrophic failure
- Phase change
- Safety testing of explosives
