= Armstrong's mixture =

Pyrotechnical composition

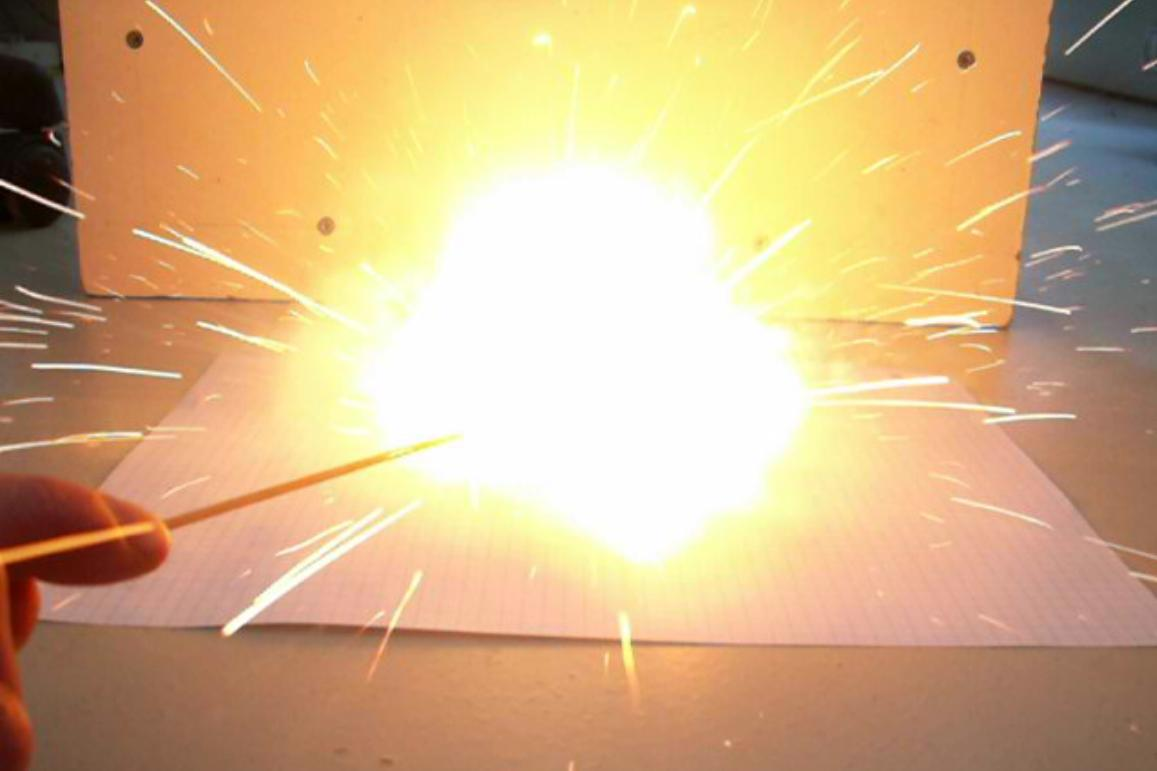
Armstrong’s Mixture

Armstrong's mixture is a highly shock and friction sensitive explosive. Formulations vary, but one consists of 67% potassium chlorate, 27% red phosphorus, 3% sulfur, and 3% calcium carbonate. It is named for Sir William Armstrong, who invented it sometime prior to 1872 for use in explosive shells.

== Toys ==
Armstrong's mixture can be used as ammunition for toy cap guns. The mixture is suspended in water with some gum arabic or similar binder and deposited in drops, each containing a few milligrams of explosive, to dry between layers of paper backing. The dots explode with some smoke when struck.

Armstrong's mixture can be used in impact firecrackers known as cap torpedoes, which explode on impact when the ball (made of clay or papier-mâché) is thrown or (with some types) launched by slingshot. The firecrackers may include gravel with the explosive mixture to ensure enough friction is generated to produce a detonation.

== Military use ==
With the addition of a grit such as boron carbide (in a modified formulation given as 70% KClO_{3}, 19% red phosphorus, 3% sulfur, 3% chalk, and 5% boron carbide by weight), Armstrong's mixture has been considered for use in firearm primers. This use as primer for artillery propellants may have been Armstrong's original purpose.

It also was seen in various patents for matches, novelty fireworks, and signalling devices.

Armstrong's mixture has been used in thrown impact-detonated improvised explosive devices, made simply by loading it into hollow balls.

== Safety ==
Armstrong's mixture is both very sensitive and very explosive, a dangerous combination that limits its practical use to toy caps. Such toy caps and fireworks typically contain no more than 10 milligrams each, but gram quantities can cause maiming hand injuries.

The mixture is likely to explode if mixed dry and is even dangerous wet. If the pH is not made neutral, phosphoric acids that may have been generated by oxidized phosphorus on contact with the water could cause it to deteriorate while slowly drying. Generally the wet slurry or paste is loaded into the final casing while wet and was heat-dried in rotating drums prior to being coated with water glass to securely protect them from leakage when globe torpedoes were still in production commercially.

Simple mixtures of red phosphorus and potassium chlorate can detonate at a wide range of proportions; a 20% phosphorus mixture had 27% of the equivalent power of a like mass of TNT in a laboratory experiment, and the detonation of the 10% and 20% phosphorus mixtures even in small unconfined samples of 1 gram was described by the authors of one study as "impressive" and "scary".

Pyrotechnician John Donner wrote in 1996 that it "is the most hazardous mixture commonly used in small fireworks."

Tenney Davis called it "a combination which is the most sensitive, dangerous, and unpredictable of the many with which the pyrotechnist has to deal. Their preparation ought under no conditions to be attempted by an amateur."

Toy charges, such as the several-milligram dots used for cap guns, are individually harmless but potentially dangerous in large numbers. On May 14, 1878, such an accident occurred in Paris. A store containing some six to eight million paper caps, totaling about 64 kilograms of explosive mass, caught fire and exploded, killing 14 and injuring 16 others.
