= Trimethylsilyl azide =

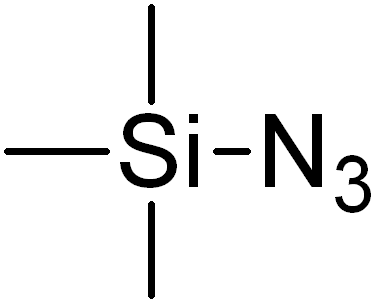

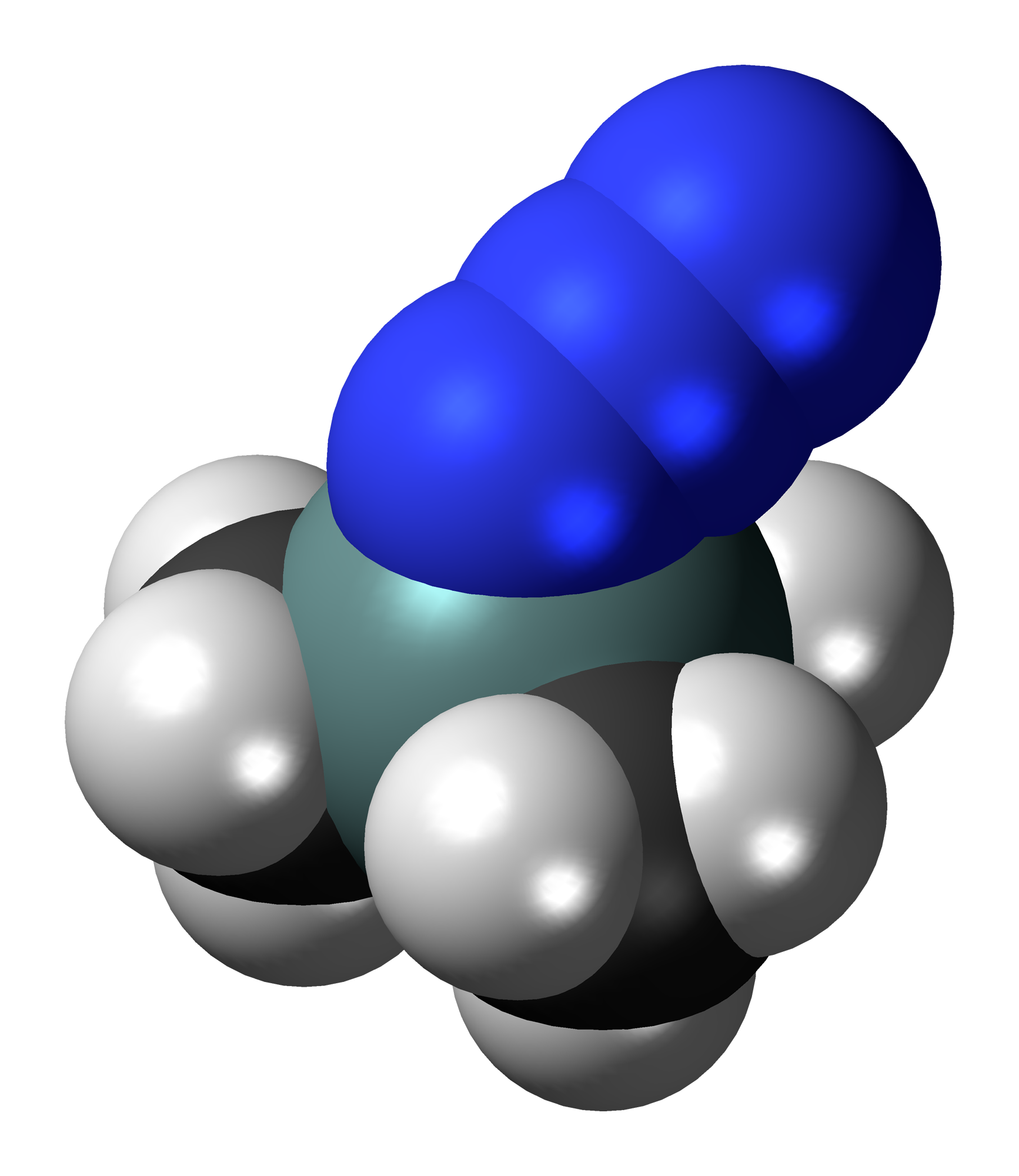

Names
- Preferred IUPAC name Azidotri(methyl)silane

Identifiers
CAS Number	4648-54-8
3D model (JSmol)	Interactive image
Beilstein Reference	1903730
ChemSpider	70747
ECHA InfoCard	100.022.798
EC Number	225-078-5
PubChem CID	78378
UNII	EM57JSM2Y9
CompTox Dashboard (EPA)	DTXSID3063542
- InChI: InChI=1S/C3H9N3Si/c1-7(2,3)6-5-4/h1-3H3 Key: SEDZOYHHAIAQIW-UHFFFAOYSA-N; InChI=1/C3H9N3Si/c1-7(2,3)6-5-4/h1-3H3 Key: SEDZOYHHAIAQIW-UHFFFAOYAJ
- SMILES: [N-]=[N+]=N[Si](C)(C)C

Properties
Chemical formula	C_{3}H_{9}N_{3}Si
Molar mass	115.211 g·mol^{−1}
Appearance	colorless liquid
Odor	Odourless; pungent
Density	0.8763 g/cm^{3} (20 °C)
Melting point	−95 °C (−139 °F; 178 K)
Boiling point	52 to 53 °C (126 to 127 °F; 325 to 326 K) at 175 mmHg (92 to 95 °C at 760 mmHg)
Solubility in water	reacts to form dangerous hydrazoic acid

Hazards
- GHS labelling
Pictograms	(GHS02: Flammable) (GHS06: Toxic) (GHS09: Environmental hazard)
Signal word	Danger
Hazard statements	H225, H301, H311, H331, H410
Precautionary statements	P210, P233, P240, P241, P242, P243, P261, P264, P270, P271, P273, P280, P301+P310, P302+P352, P303+P361+P353, P304+P340, P311, P312, P321, P322, P330, P361, P363, P370+P378, P391, P403+P233, P403+P235, P405, P501
NFPA 704 (fire diamond)	4 3 0
Flash point	6 °C (43 °F; 279 K)
Autoignition temperature	> 300 °C (572 °F; 573 K)
- Lethal dose or concentration (LD, LC)
LD_{50} (median dose)	100 mg/kg (Oral, expert judgement); 315.8 mg/kg (dermal)
- Except where otherwise noted, data are given for materials in their standard state (at 25 °C [77 °F], 100 kPa). verify (what is ?) Infobox references

Trimethylsilyl azide is the organosilicon compound with the formula (CH_{3})_{3}SiN_{3}. A colorless liquid, it is a reagent in organic chemistry, serving as the equivalent of hydrazoic acid.

== Preparation ==
Trimethylsilyl azide is commercially available. It may be prepared by the reaction of trimethylsilyl chloride and sodium azide:

(CH_{3})_{3}Si−Cl + NaN_{3} → (CH_{3})_{3}Si−N_{3} + NaCl

== Reactions ==
The compound hydrolyzes to hydrazoic acid:

(CH_{3})_{3}SiN_{3} + H_{2}O → (CH_{3})_{3}SiOH + HN_{3}

The compound adds to ketones and aldehydes to give the siloxy azides and subsequently tetrazoles:

(CH_{3})_{3}SiN_{3} + R_{2}CO → R_{2}C(N_{3})OSi(CH_{3})_{3}

It ring-opens epoxides to give azido alcohols.

It has been used in the Oseltamivir total synthesis.

== Safety ==
Trimethylsilyl azide is incompatible with moisture, strong oxidizing agents, and strong acids. Azides are often explosive, as illustrated by their use in air bags.
