= Eugène Turpin =

French chemist (1848–1927)

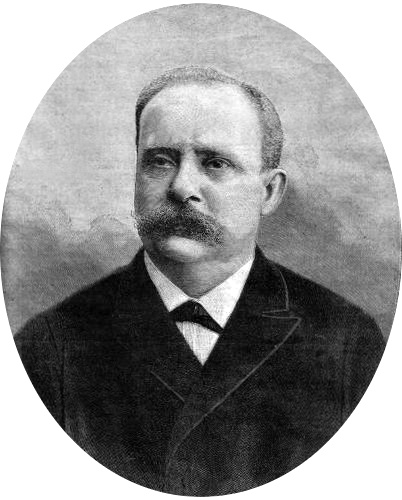
Eugène Turpin.

François Eugène Turpin (30 September 1848 – 24 January 1927) was a French chemist involved in research of explosive materials. He lived in Colombes.

== Biography ==
In 1881, Turpin proposed panclastites, a class of Sprengel explosives based on a mixture of a suitable fuel with dinitrogen tetroxide as an oxidizer.

In 1885, based on research of Hermann Sprengel, Turpin patented the use of pressed and cast picric acid in blasting charges and artillery shells. In 1887, the French government adopted it under the name Melinite, with addition of gun cotton. Since 1888, Britain started manufacturing a very similar mixture in Lydd, Kent, under the name Lyddite. Japan followed with an improved formula known as Schimose.

In 1889, a Captain Tripone stole his secret and sold it to Germany. Turpin was falsely accused of the treason and imprisoned. He was pardoned in 1893 after a campaign led by Le Petit Journal, and exonerated in 1901.

In 1897, Turpin sued Jules Verne for basing Thomas Roch from the Facing the Flag novel on him and the melinite explosive. Verne, defended by future president Raymond Poincaré, was found innocent; his letter to his brother Paul, however, confirms the character was indeed based on Turpin.

After World War I, investigation of turpinite confirmed it to be a fictional war gas allegedly developed by Eugène Turpin.
