= M687 155 mm projectile =

Chemical Weapon projectile

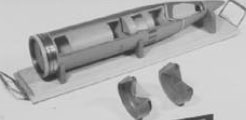
A cross-section of the M687 155 mm sarin shell

The M687 was an American 155 mm binary sarin chemical artillery shell. The design was standardized in 1976 and production began on December 16, 1987 at Pine Bluff Arsenal, Pine Bluff, Arkansas. Production was halted three years later, following the 1990 Chemical Weapons Accord between the United States and the USSR, and the dismantling of existing stocks began in November 1997 at Hawthorne Army Depot, Nevada. America's remaining stocks were stored at the Deseret Chemical Depot, Utah, and the Umatilla Chemical Depot (Umatilla County, Oregon).

The shell contained two canisters separated by a rupture disk. The compartments were filled with two liquid precursor chemicals for sarin (GB2): methylphosphonyl difluoride (denominated DF) and a mixture of isopropyl alcohol and isopropyl amine (denominated OPA) is in a second canister. The isopropyl amine binds the hydrogen fluoride generated during the chemical reaction. When the shell was fired the force of the acceleration would cause the disk between them to breach and the spinning of the projectile facilitated mixing. The two precursor chemicals would react in flight to produce sarin and when the shell reached its target the sarin would be released.

The shells were meant to be stored and transported with only the OPA compartment loaded; the fuze and the DF compartment would be inserted shortly before firing.

The M687 was never used in combat and, under the Chemical Weapons Convention, the U.S. destroyed the shells and the precursor chemical DF as part of its agreement to eliminate all chemical weapons. More than 258,000 of the shells were shipped to Hawthorne Army Depot from their storage at Deseret Chemical Depot, Utah, and the Umatilla Chemical Depot, Oregon and were destroyed by July 1999. The last of the U.S.'s stockpile of DF was destroyed on April 6, 2006.

== See also ==
- Chemical Weapons Convention
- M104 155 mm projectile
- M110 155 mm projectile
- M121 155 mm projectile
- M2 4.2-inch mortar
- M55 (rocket)
- United States and weapons of mass destruction
