= Panclastite =

Panclastites are a class of Sprengel explosives similar to oxyliquits. They were first suggested in 1881 by Eugène Turpin, a French chemist. They are a mixture of liquid dinitrogen tetroxide serving as oxidizer with a suitable fuel, e.g. carbon disulfide, in the 3:2 volume ratio. Other fuel being used is nitrobenzene. Possible alternative fuels are e.g. nitrotoluene, gasoline, nitromethane, or halocarbons.

Panclastites are shock-sensitive and difficult to handle, requiring their mixing immediately before use; also the dinitrogen tetroxide is highly corrosive and explodes in contact with some chemicals. Despite their brisance and detonation velocity being comparable with TNT, panclastites have virtually no use today.

During World War I, due to shortages of other explosives, French used some panclastite-class mixtures, which they called anilites, in small aircraft bombs. The mixing of the chemicals was triggered by airflow spinning a propeller on the nose of the bomb after it was dropped, mixing the previously separated chemicals inside. The resulting mixture was so sensitive the bombs did not need a fuze to explode on impact.

In the 1880s, Germans were testing torpedoes with panclastite warhead. Carbon disulfide and nitrogen tetroxide were stored in separate glass compartments, which were broken when the torpedo was launched and the chemicals mixed, and later were detonated by a contact fuse.
