= M104 155 mm projectile =

Chemical artillery shell

Projectile, 155 mm howitzer, M104
- Type: Artillery shell
- Place of origin: United States

Service history
- In service: 1940s–1970s
- Used by: United States

Production history
- Produced: 1940s-1970s

Specifications
- Mass: 94.81 pounds (43.0 kg) (HD); 98.71 pounds (44.8 kg) (WP)
- Length: 26.8 inches (68.1 cm)
- Diameter: 155 mm (6.1 in)
- Warhead: Distilled sulfur mustard (HD); White phosphorus (WP)
- Warhead weight: 11.7 lb (5.3 kg) (HD); 15.6 lb (7.1 kg) (WP)
- Detonation mechanism: Timed fuze
- Launch platform: M114 155 mm howitzer M44 self propelled howitzer M109 howitzer

The M104 155 mm projectile is a chemical artillery shell designed for use by the U.S. Army. It was specifically designed to carry about 11.7 pounds (5.3 kg) of sulfur mustard (H) or (HD) blister agent (distilled mustard). As early as the 1960s, the shell was also filled with white phosphorus to be used for obscuration and signaling.

== History and design ==
Following World War I, militaries around the world began working to standardize calibers of ammunition within their countries. In the United States, the military began focusing on replacing the European-made 75 mm artillery shells with 105 mm and 155 mm shells.

The M104 (along with the M110, which it shares many design elements with) was designed as a 155 mm artillery shell for use in the M114 howitzer. It is a 26.8 inches (68.1 cm) steel shell with a rotating band near the base, and a burster well that goes down the center of the shell. Filler of either sulfur mustard or white phosphorus is placed in the empty space and a fuze is fixed to the top before firing.

== Variants and markings ==
=== Projectile, gas, persistent, HD, 155 mm howitzer, M104 ===
This version of the shell was designed as a chemical weapon delivery system. It weighs 94.81 pounds (43.0 kg) in total and is filled with 11.7 lb (5.3 kg) of distilled mustard (HD). It is marked as a standard chemical artillery munition, being gray with two green, horizontal bands.

The United States Army still possesses a limited stockpile of these munitions, which are in the process of being safely decommissioned in accordance with the 1997 Chemical Weapons Convention.

=== Projectile, smoke, WP, 155 mm gun, M104 ===
A later version of the M104, this version is 98.71 pounds (44.8 kg) in total and filled with 15.6 lb (7.1 kg) of white phosphorus. Due to the properties of white phosphorus, the shell also has mild incendiary effects. It is marked as a military smoke munition, being gray with a single yellow, horizontal band.

== See also ==
- M110 155 mm projectile
- M121 155 mm projectile
- M687 155 mm projectile
