= M104 =

M104 or M-104 may refer to:

- Sombrero Galaxy, called M104 by Messier number
- M104 group of galaxies
- HMS Walney (M104), a British warship
- M104 Wolverine, a military armored bridge
- M104 155mm Cartridge, a U.S. Army chemical artillery shell
- M104 (New York City bus), a New York City Bus route in Manhattan
- Mercedes-Benz M104 engine
- M-104 highway (Michigan), a road in the United States
- a Y-chromosome mutation, also called P22
