= M121 =

M121 or M-121 may refer to:

- M121/A1 155mm Cartridge, a U.S. Army chemical artillery shell
- M-121 (bomb), a World War II bomb
- M121 mortar carrier, the United States designation for the Soltam TT6
- M-121 highway (Michigan), a road connecting Zeeland and Grandville
- Mauboussin M.121 Corsaire Major, a 1921 French trainer and touring aircraft
- M121 (Cape Town), a Metropolitan Route in Cape Town, South Africa
