= M121 155 mm projectile =

Projectile, 155 mm, M121/A1
- Type: Artillery shell
- Place of origin: United States

Service history
- In service: 1954–1997
- Used by: United States
- Wars: Cold War

Production history
- Produced: 1954-1980s

Specifications
- Mass: 97.2 pounds (44.1 kg) (M121); 98.9 pounds (44.9 kg) (M121A1)
- Length: 26.8 inches (68.1 cm) (M121); 27 inches (68.6 cm) (M121A1)
- Diameter: 155 mm (6.1 in)
- Warhead: Sarin (GB) (M121 and M121A1); VX (M121A1)
- Warhead weight: 6.5 pounds (2.9 kg) (GB); 6 pounds (2.7 kg) (VX)
- Launch platform: M114 155 mm howitzer M44 self propelled howitzer M109 howitzer M198 howitzer

The M121/A1 155 mm projectile was a chemical artillery shell designed for use by the U.S. Army. It was designed to be used with approximately 6.5 lb (2.9 kg) of GB or VX nerve agents.

== History ==
The U.S. Army standardized the M121 shell in 1954 as an artillery shell capable of delivering sarin via a 155 mm howitzer. Shortly after the discovery of VX in 1952, the U.S. Army Chemical Corps began experimenting with employment systems for the newly discovered nerve agent. The M121A1 was standardized in 1961 as a modified version of the original projectile with the additional capability of transporting VX as well as sarin. The M121 and M121A1 have never been used in combat and remaining stockpiles are currently being disposed of in accordance with the 1997 Chemical Weapons Convention.

== Design ==
The M121 was designed as a steel shell that was 26.7 inches (67.8 cm) long with the fuze assembly attached and 23.8 inches (60.5 cm) without the fuze. The center contains a burster, which is topped by a booster propellant, which subsequently screws into the fuze. the hollow portion of the shell is filled with 6.5 pounds (2.9 kg) of sarin (GB).

The M121A1 is identical to the M121 with the exception of it using a larger fuze assembly, which makes the entire projectile 28.8 inches (73.2 cm). The large fuze assembly allows for the M121A1 to safely carry and deliver 6 pounds (2.7 kg) of VX or 6.5 pounds (2.9 kg) of sarin away from the howitzer.

== See also ==
- M104 155 mm projectile
- M110 155 mm projectile
- M687 155 mm projectile
