= Miedziankit =

Binary chlorate-based explosive

Miedziankit is a Polish explosive. It consists of 90% potassium chlorate and 10% kerosene.

Miedziankit was developed by Polish chemist Stanisław Ignacy Łaszczyński and patented by him in 1909. It was widely used in Germany, Poland, and Russia in the years around World War I, when nitrate-based explosives were needed for the war effort.

It is a Sprengel explosive and can be prepared just before use by soaking chlorate cartridges in kerosene. Alternatively, it can be mixed at the factory, using kerosene with a high enough flash point (above 30 °C) to make the explosive safe for transport.

When pressed in an iron tube to a density of 1.7 g/cm^{3}, Miedziankit has a detonation velocity of 3000 m/s. For comparison, "rackarock", a mixture of chlorate and nitrobenzene, invented by Divin in 1860 and patented in 1881, had velocity of 5,000 m/s.
