= M110 155 mm projectile =

Chemical artillery shell

Projectile, 155 mm howitzer, M110/A1/A2
- Type: Artillery shell
- Place of origin: United States

Service history
- In service: 1940s–present
- Used by: United States
- Wars: World War II; Korean War; Operation Powerpack; Vietnam War; Invasion of Grenada; Invasion of Panama; Gulf War; War in Afghanistan (2001-2021); Iraq War; Operation Inherent Resolve

Production history
- Produced: 1940s–present

Specifications
- Overall length: 26.8 inches (68.1 cm)
- Filling: Distilled sulfur mustard (HD); White phosphorus (WP)
- Filling weight: 9.7 lb (4.4 kg) (HD); 14.6 lb (6.6 kg) (WP, M110 and M110A1); 15.6 lb (7.1 kg) (WP, M110A2)
- Detonation mechanism: Timed Fuze

The M110 155 mm projectile is an artillery shell used by the U.S. Army and U.S. Marine Corps. The M110 was originally designed as a chemical artillery round to deliver blister agents via howitzer as a replacement for the World War I-era 75 mm chemical projectiles. The design was later repurposed as a white phosphorus smoke round for marking, signaling, and screening purposes. The white phosphorus variants of the shell also have a secondary, incendiary effect.

== Original design ==
Officially designated projectile, 155 mm howitzer, M110, the original round was a 26.8-inch (68.1 cm) steel shell with a rotating band near its base and a burster rod down its center. The original shell typically contained 9.7 pounds (4.4 kg) of sulfur mustard (H) or distilled sulfur mustard (HD), which would fill the hollow space in the shell. As early as the 1960s, a white phosphorus version was created under the same designation with 14.6 pounds (6.6 kg) of white phosphorus filler. Both versions were designed for employment by the M114 howitzer and the M44 Self-Propelled Howitzer for use as terrain denial (in the case of the mustard-filled versions), target-marking, and obscuration (in the case of the white phosphorus versions.)

== Design variants and markings ==
=== M110 ===
The original version of the shell came in two variations, one filled with mustard (HD) (projectile, gas, persistent, HD, 155 mm howitzer, M110) and one filled with white phosphorus (WP) (projectile, smoke, WP, 155 mm gun, M110). To distinguish between the two, the HD versions were gray marked with two, horizontal, green bands, like most other chemical artillery shells. The WP versions were gray with a single, horizontal, yellow band, as is standard for military smoke munitions.

Both versions are now considered obsolete, with the WP version seeing updated versions in later incarnations of the shell.

The HD version has not been produced since the 1960s and was never used in combat. Remaining stockpiles of the HD version are in the process of being destroyed in accordance with the 1997 Chemical Weapons Convention.

=== M110A1 ===
The first upgrade to the M110 shell is only slightly modified from the original, maintaining the 14.6 pounds (6.6 kg) white phosphorus filler weight of the original with slight modifications to the release mechanisms to make the shell more reliable. It is primarily used for signaling and small-scale screening missions. The M110A1 is gray with a single, yellow, horizontal band, which is standard for military smoke munitions.

=== M110A2 ===
The second upgrade to the M110 shell is more dramatically modified from the other two variants, with thinner casing to increase the amount of filler that can be placed in the shell. The M110A2 contains 15.6 pounds (7.1 kg) of white phosphorus, which increases the duration of the smoke it produces. This change makes the M110A2 ideal for target marking and large-scale obscuration missions. The M110A2 is gray with a single, yellow, horizontal band, which is standard for military smoke munitions.

== Similar projectiles ==
- M104 155 mm projectile
- M121 155 mm projectile
- M687 155 mm projectile
