= Turpinite =

Turpinite, also called Turpenite, is a fictional war gas allegedly developed by the French chemist Eugène Turpin and deployed against the attacking German army during the first months of World War I.

According to contemporary accounts, Turpinite, delivered by artillery shells, silently and suddenly killed any person within 400 yards (370 m) of impact with its fumes. Survivors of Turpinite barrages reported a strong chemical smell after an attack. In reality, this smell was a side effect of the explosives used by the French and British militaries during the war. The widespread, sudden deaths caused by artillery were in many cases caused by concussion, which leaves no mark on the victim.

After the war, German scientist Fritz Haber, who pioneered German gas attacks at the Second Battle of Ypres, said German soldiers had reported a strong chemical smell attributed to turpenite. Haber and others investigated, finding the smell was due to incomplete combustion of the picric acid used in British artillery shells. The belief that the French used chemical weapons in 1914 may have contributed to later German use of such weapons.

== Bibliography ==
- Max Hastings, Catastrophe 1914: Europe Goes to War. London, Knopf Press, Release Date 24 September 2013, ISBN 978-0307597052, 640 pp.
