= Oxyliquit =

Explosive material containing liquid oxygen and fuel (e.g. organic fuels)

An Oxyliquit, also called liquid air explosive or liquid oxygen explosive, is an explosive material which is a mixture of liquid oxygen (LOX) with a suitable fuel, such as carbon (as lampblack), or an organic chemical (e.g. a mixture of soot and naphthalene), wood meal, or aluminium powder or sponge. It is a class of Sprengel explosives.

== Properties ==
Oxyliquits have numerous advantages. They are inexpensive to make, can be initiated by a safety fuse, and in case of a misfire, the oxygen evaporates quickly, rendering the charge quite safe in a short period of time. The first large scale deployment took place in 1899 during the building of the Simplon Tunnel, in the form of cartridges filled with diatomaceous earth soaked with petroleum, or an absorbent cork charcoal, dipped in liquid oxygen immediately before use. In another modification, the cartridge is filled with liquid oxygen after placement in the borehole.

One of the disadvantages of oxyliquits is that, once mixed, they are sensitive to sparks, shock, and heat, in addition to reported cases of spontaneous ignition. The power relative to weight is high, but the density is low, so the brisance is low as well. Ignition by a fuse alone is sometimes unreliable. The charge should be detonated within 5 minutes of soaking, but even after 15 minutes it may be capable of exploding, even though weaker and with production of carbon dioxide.

An oxyliquit explosion can be accidentally produced while filling high-altitude aircraft systems. When liquid oxygen is spilled on tarmac (asphalt) the pavement can become sufficiently explosive to be set off simply by walking on it, even though the oxygen evaporates shortly after it is spilled.

At first, liquid air, self-enriched by standing (nitrogen has a lower boiling point and evaporates preferentially) was used, but pure liquid oxygen gives better results.

A mixture of lampblack and liquid oxygen was measured to have a detonation velocity of 3,000 m/s, and 4 to 12% more explosive power than dynamite. The long duration of the flame it produced, however, made it unsafe for use in the presence of explosive gases. Therefore, oxyliquits were mostly used in open quarries and strip mines.

== History ==
The explosive properties of these mixtures were discovered in Germany in 1895 by Prof. Carl von Linde, a developer of a successful machine for liquefaction of gases, who named them oxyliquits.

In 1930, over 3 million pounds (1.4×10^{6} kg) of liquid oxygen were used for this purpose in Germany alone, and additional 201,466 lb (91,383 kg) were consumed by British quarries. The accident rate was lower than with conventional explosives. However, the Dewar flasks the LOX was stored in occasionally exploded, which was caused by iron impurities in the activated carbon serving as trace gas absorbent in the insulation vacuum layer in the flask, which caused spontaneous ignition in case of LOX leak into the enclosed space.

Use of oxyliquits during World War II was low, as there was a plentiful supply of nitrates obtained from synthetic ammonia.

Due to the complicated machinery required for manufacture of liquid oxygen, oxyliquit explosives were used mostly only where their consumption was high. In the United States, some such locations were the strip mines in coal mining areas of the Midwest. Its consumption peaked in 1953 with 10,190 tons, but then decreased to zero in 1968, when it was entirely replaced with the cheaper ANFO.
