= Sprengel explosive =

Class of explosives

Sprengel explosives are a generic class of materials invented by Hermann Sprengel in the 1870s. They consist of stoichiometric mixtures of strong oxidisers and reactive fuels, mixed just prior to use in order to enhance safety. Either the oxidiser or the fuel, or both, should be a liquid to facilitate mixing, and intimate contact between the materials for a fast reaction rate.

Sprengel suggested nitric acid, nitrates and chlorates as oxidisers, and nitroaromatics (e.g. nitrobenzene) as fuels. Other Sprengel explosives used at various times include charcoal with liquid oxygen (an oxyliquit), "Rackarock", and ANFO ammonium nitrate (oxidiser) mixed with a fuel oil (fuel), normally diesel, kerosene, or nitromethane. Eventually ANFO supplanted all others because its oxidiser was the safest, and - due to its widespread use as a fertiliser in agriculture - also the cheapest.

"Rackarock" consisted of potassium chlorate and nitrobenzene. It was provided in the form of permeable cartridges of the chlorate, which were placed in wire baskets and dipped in the nitrobenzene for a few seconds before use. For underwater use, it could be provided in cans instead. It was famously used in the massive submarine demolition of Flood Rock, a navigational hazard in Long Island Sound in 1885. The charge of over a hundred tonnes of explosive (laid in tunnels 20 metres below sea level) destroyed approximately 600,000 tonnes of rock. It was used as part of anti-personnel mines in the defense of Leningrad. It was patented by Nikolai Divin in 1881.

"Helhoffite" a mixture of 28% nitrobenzene and 72% nitric acid. Usually, the finished liquid mixture was saturated with diatomaceous earth, which gave a consistent plastic explosive. The volume of explosive gases is 713 l/kg. The explosion temperature is 3141 °C. They were widely used in the USA, Italy and France. At the end of the 19th century, helgophyte was used on a large scale in the construction of large railway networks in Russia (the Trans-Siberian Railway) and China. It is named after the inventor, Gelgoff.

== See also ==
- Cheddite
- Miedziankit
- Oxyliquit
- Panclastite
