= Hermann Sprengel =

German-British chemist (1834–1906)

Hermann Sprengel FRS
- Born: 29 August 1834; Hanover, Germany
- Died: 14 January 1906 (aged 71); London, United Kingdom
- Occupation: Chemist
- Known for: Sprengel pump

Hermann Sprengel FRS (29 August 1834 – 14 January 1906) was a German-British chemist who discovered the explosive nature of picric acid in 1873, patented safety explosives and invented the mercurial air pump.

== Life ==
He was born at Schillerslage, near Hanover, on 29 August 1834. Sprengel was the son of George Sprengel. He was educated in Göttingen and earned his degree at the university at Heidelberg in 1858. He moved to England the following year and became a naturalised British subject.

He was first employed as an assistant in chemical laboratory in Oxford and then moved to London to work at Guy's and St Bartholomew's Hospitals, before working in the chemical works of Thomas Farmer of Kennington (1865-1870). There he invented a generic class of materials called Sprengel explosives. In addition he invented a very robust and continuously operable device called the Sprengel Pump which could reduce the amount of air in a chamber to one-millionth of its volume paving the way for the filament light bulb.

He was elected a Fellow of the Royal Society in 1878. His candidature citation read "Distinguished as a Chemist and Physicist. Author of the following researches.

- (1) Ueber einen neuen Lothrohrapparat (Pogg Ann v 112 1861)
- (2) On the detection of Nitric Acid (J Ch Soc 1865)
- (3) Researches on the vacuum (J Ch Soc 1865)
- (4) On determining the weight of heterogeneous liquids (J Ch Soc 1866)
- (5) Improvements in the preparation of Explosive compounds
- (6) The water air-pump (Phil Mag, 1873)
- (7) An Air-bath of constant temperature between 100 degrees & 200 degrees C (J Ch Soc 1873)
- (8) A method of determining the Specific Gravity of liquids with ease & great exactness (J Ch Soc 1873 & Pogg Ann 1874)
- (9) A new class of explosives which are non-explosive during their manufacture storage & transport (J Ch Soc 1873)
- (10) Use of water "atomiser" in production of Sulphuric Acid (Ch News 1875)."

He died at 54 Denbigh Street, London, S.W., on 14 January 1906, and was buried in Brompton Cemetery. He had never married.
