= M44 self-propelled howitzer =

M44
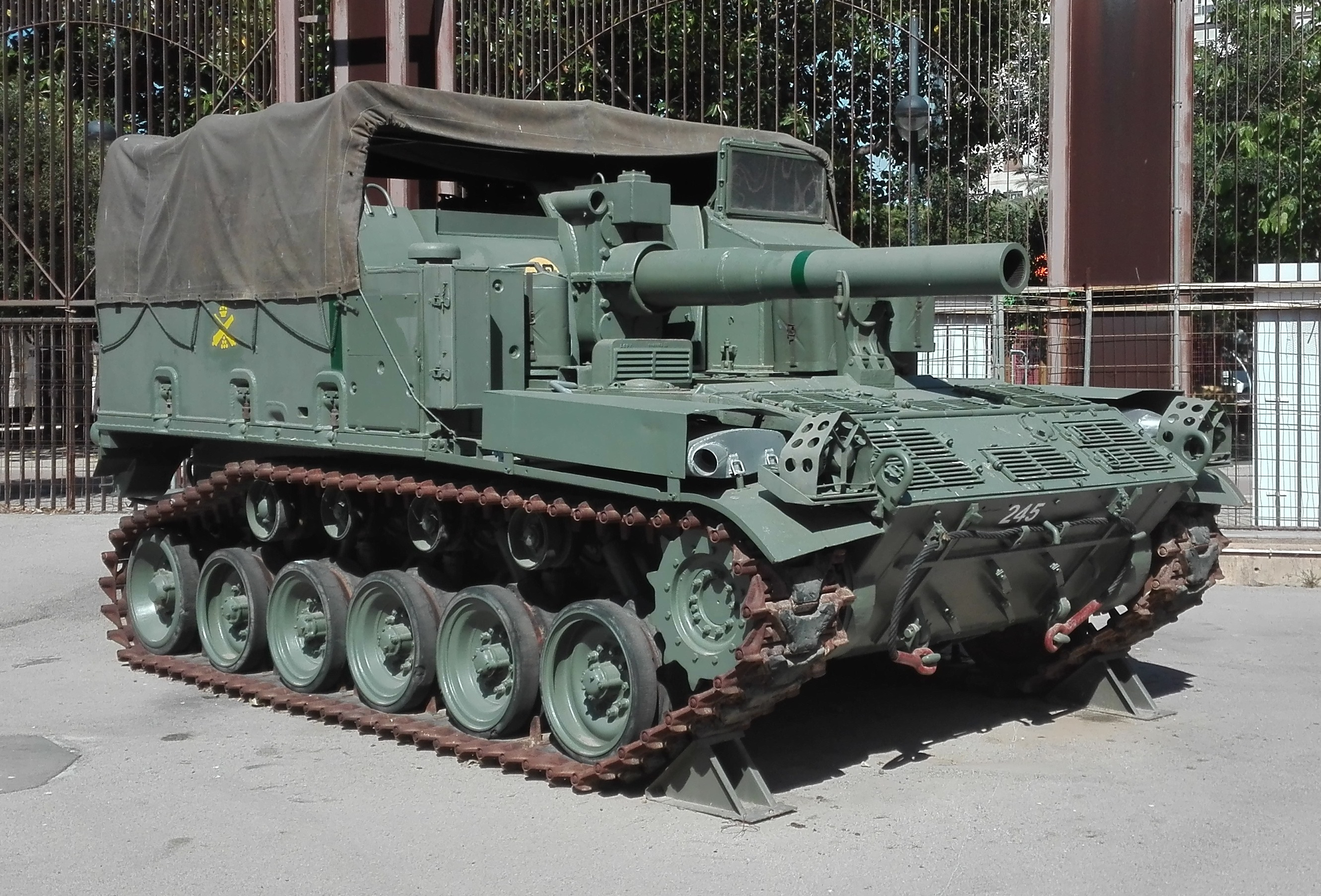
- Type: Self-propelled artillery
- Place of origin: United States

Service history
- Wars: Kurdish–Turkish conflict

Specifications
- Mass: 32 short tons (29,000 kg)
- Length: 6.16 metres (20 ft 3 in)
- Width: 3.24 metres (10 ft 8 in)
- Height: 3.11 metres (10 ft 2 in)
- Crew: 5 (2 Loaders, Gunner, Commander, Driver)
- Shell: separate loading, bagged charge
- Caliber: 155 mm L/23 caliber
- Breech: interrupted screw
- Elevation: −5 to 65 degrees
- Traverse: 30 degrees
- Rate of fire: Sustained: 1 rpm Rapid: 4 rpm
- Muzzle velocity: 1,850 ft/s (560 m/s)
- Effective firing range: Conventional: 14.6 km (9.1 mi)
- Maximum firing range: 16,000 yards (15,000 m)
- Armor: 12 millimetres (0.47 in)
- Main armament: M114 155mm howitzer
- Secondary armament: M2HB .50 caliber machine gun
- Engine: Continental AOS-895-3; 450 hp (340 kW)
- Suspension: torsion bar
- Operational range: 75 miles (121 km)
- Maximum speed: 35 mph (56 km/h)

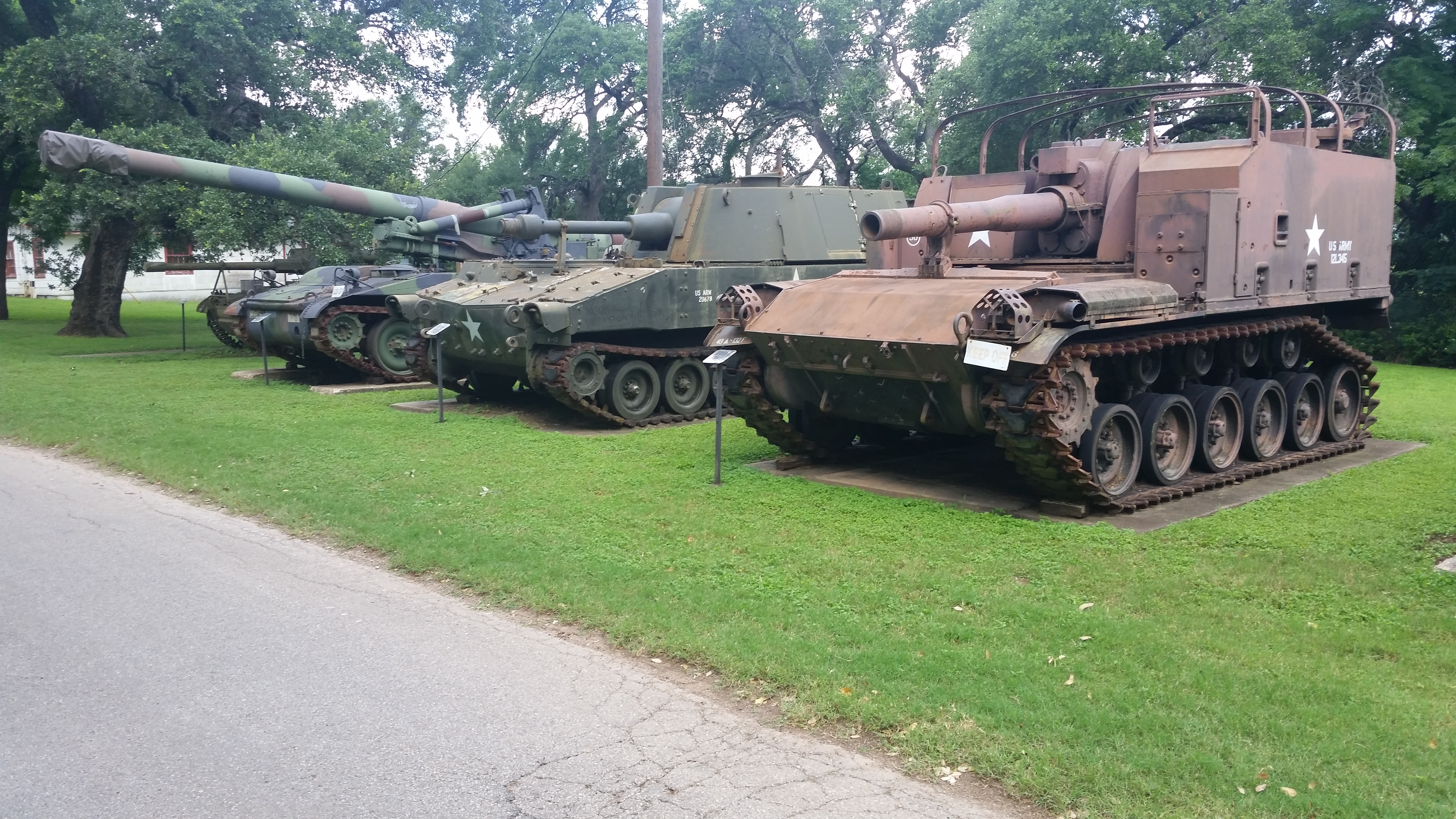
M44 (right) at the Texas Military Forces Museum

The M44 was an American-made self-propelled 155 mm howitzer based on the M41 Walker Bulldog tank chassis, first introduced in the early 1950s. Flaws in its design prevented it from seeing action in the Korean War, but the type went on to serve in the armies of the United States, West Germany, Italy, and the United Kingdom into the late Cold War period, and even longer in Turkish service.

== History ==
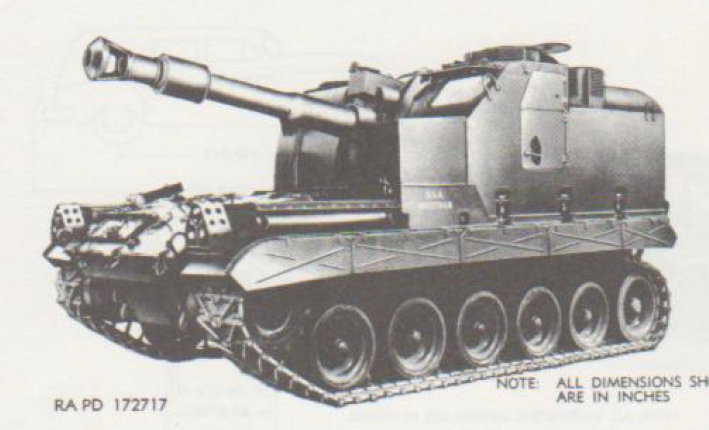
1953 image of the T99E1

After WWII the US Army sought to replace the M41 Howitzer Motor Carriage with a better SPH using the drive train of the future light tank then developed (originally T37, later T41 and finally M41), giving it increased battlefield mobility. Unlike the M41 and the earlier M12 Gun Motor Carriage, the T99 was to have an enclosed gun compartment, giving the five-man crew some armor protection even when firing the cannon. The 155mm cannon, designated T97, was to be a radically new design, with a muzzle brake, bore evacuator and new, separately-loaded ammunition with metal cartridge cases. T99 should also have had a revolutionary gun control system.

When the Korean War broke out in 1950, the US Army realized it didn’t have enough self-propelled artillery the development was sped up, and with features from T41E1 light tank, the T99E1 SPH prototype was rushed into production even before testing was complete. After 250 had already been produced by the Massey Harris company, it was discovered that firing the howitzer discharged poisonous fumes into the gun compartment, leading to the cancellation of the order. Engineers offered a revised design called the T194E1 with a modified howitzer T186E1 (standardized as M45) based on the M114 bagged charge ammunition and open (roofless) crew compartment that successfully vented the fumes, albeit at the cost of crew protection. The already produced vehicles were upgraded to the new standard, with the designation M44, and deployed to front line units in 1954, too late to see action in the Korean War. The M44 fleet was later upgraded with AOS-895-6 engines, and thus designated the M44A1. Production ended in 1958. The M44 served on until 1963, when it was replaced by the M109.

The M44 was exported to West Germany, Italy, the UK (where it was called the "Cardinal" under the ecclesiastical naming convention for self-propelled artillery) and Turkey.

=== British M44s ===
In 1956, the United Kingdom received 58 M44s through the Mutual Defense Assistance Program. 52 were deployed to the British Army of the Rhine in the 1st Royal Horse Artillery and 4th Royal Horse Artillery, while the remaining six were sent to England. The M44 was considered a major improvement over the World War II vintage Sexton self-propelled howitzers. As newer weapons became available, the M44s were passed on to different units, and were ultimately retired and returned to the United States in June 1968.

=== Turkish M44T ===
In 1986, 222 Turkish Army M44s were extensively upgraded with 36 caliber 155mm howitzers by Rheinmetall with an increased range of 24.7 km. An MTU MB 833 Aa-501 V-6 water-cooled diesel developing 450 hp at 2,300 rpm coupled to the original Allison CD-500-3 transmission via a ZF gearbox was fitted. There were numerous other improvements such as upgraded suspension, tracks and fire control and increased fuel capacity. The driver's position was moved into the hull. The last was delivered in 1992. Some sources claim they have now been withdrawn, but two were seen in a video by the Russian news agency RT, allegedly firing into Northern Syria from a border post inside Turkey in 2015.

== Variants ==
- T99E1: Closed-topped prototype pilot vehicle.
- T194E1 and M44: Revised open-topped production model.
- M44A1: M44s upgraded with AOS-895-6 engine, increasing range to 82 miles.
- M44T: 222 Turkish vehicles upgraded with 36 caliber 155 mm howitzers with range of 24.7 km, new engines with greatly increased range, reconfigured driver's seat, fire control and other upgrades. Upgrades conducted between 1986 and 1992.

== Operators ==
- United States : 250 produced
- United Kingdom : 58 received in 1955, serving until 1968
- West Germany : All retired
- Belgium: In service from 1956 to 1967. 25 in stock in 1983
- Greece : All retired
- Italy : Served in the heavy battalion of Italian Armored divisions, including the Ariete division until 1970.
- Taiwan : 48, All retired.
- Turkey : 222 upgraded to M44T variant by Rheinmetall between 1986 and 1992.
- Japan : 10 served from 1965 to 1980s, replaced by the Type 75
- Spain : All retired

=== Surviving vehicles ===
At least 39 surviving M44s have been identified in North America and Europe, not including any still in Turkish service.
