= Shell (projectile) =

Payload-carrying projectile

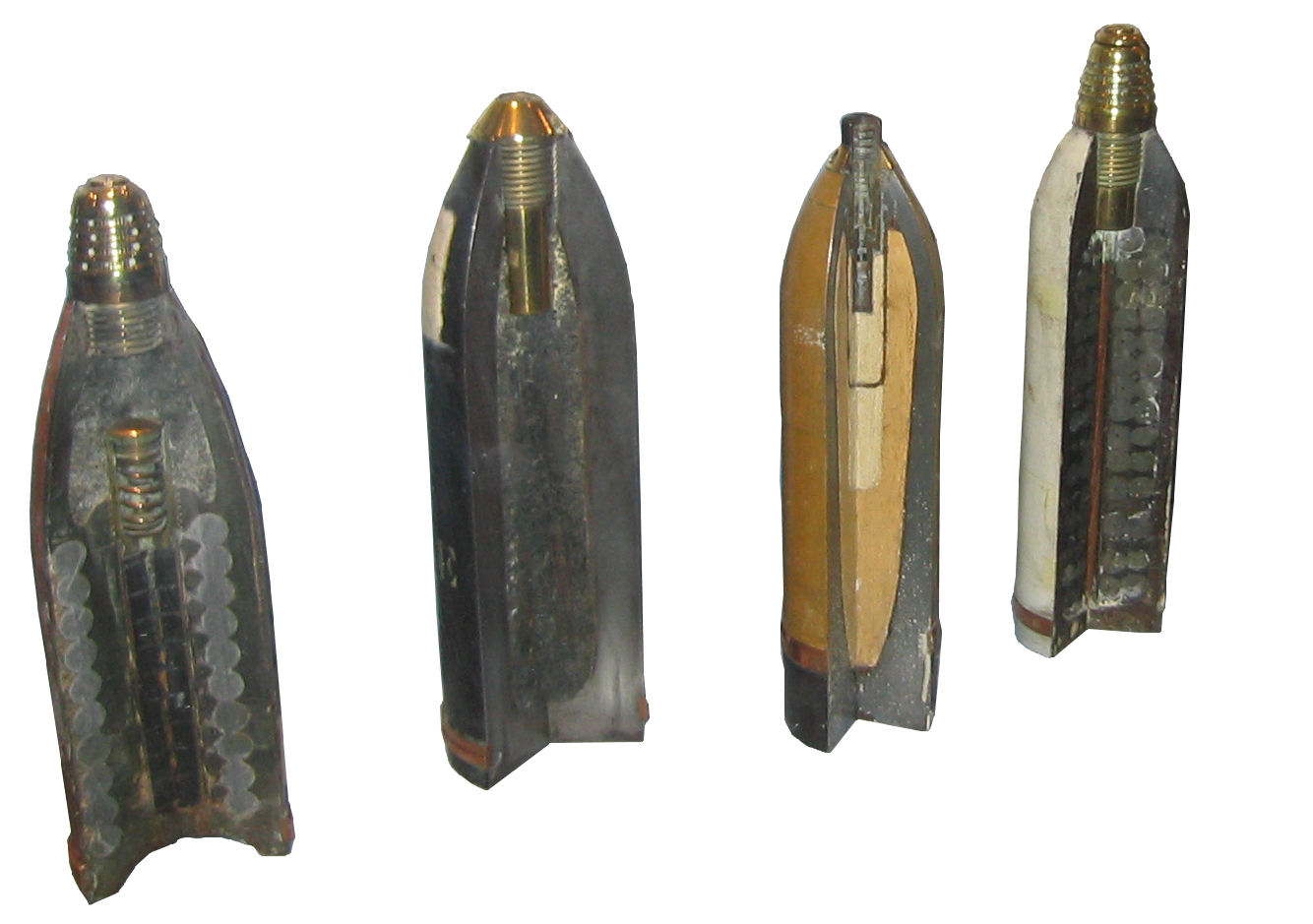
Some sectioned shells from the First World War. From left to right: 90 mm shrapnel shell, 120 mm pig iron incendiary shell, 77/14 model – 75 mm high-explosive shell, model 16–75 mm shrapnel shell.

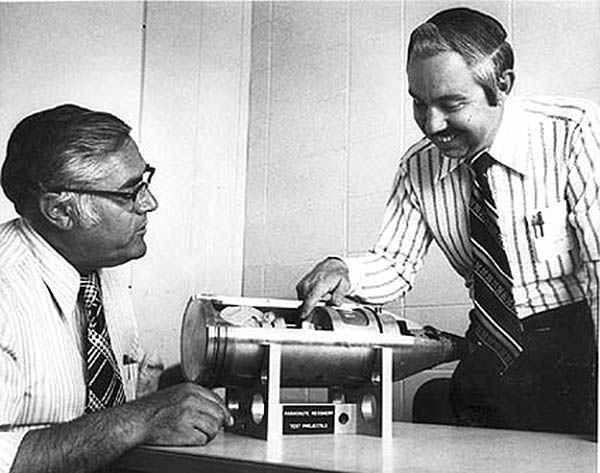
US scientists with a full-scale cut-away model of the W48 155 millimeter nuclear artillery shell, a very small tactical nuclear weapon with an explosive yield equivalent to 72 tons of TNT (0.072 kiloton). It could be fired from any standard 155 mm (6.1 inch) howitzer (e.g., the M114 or M198).

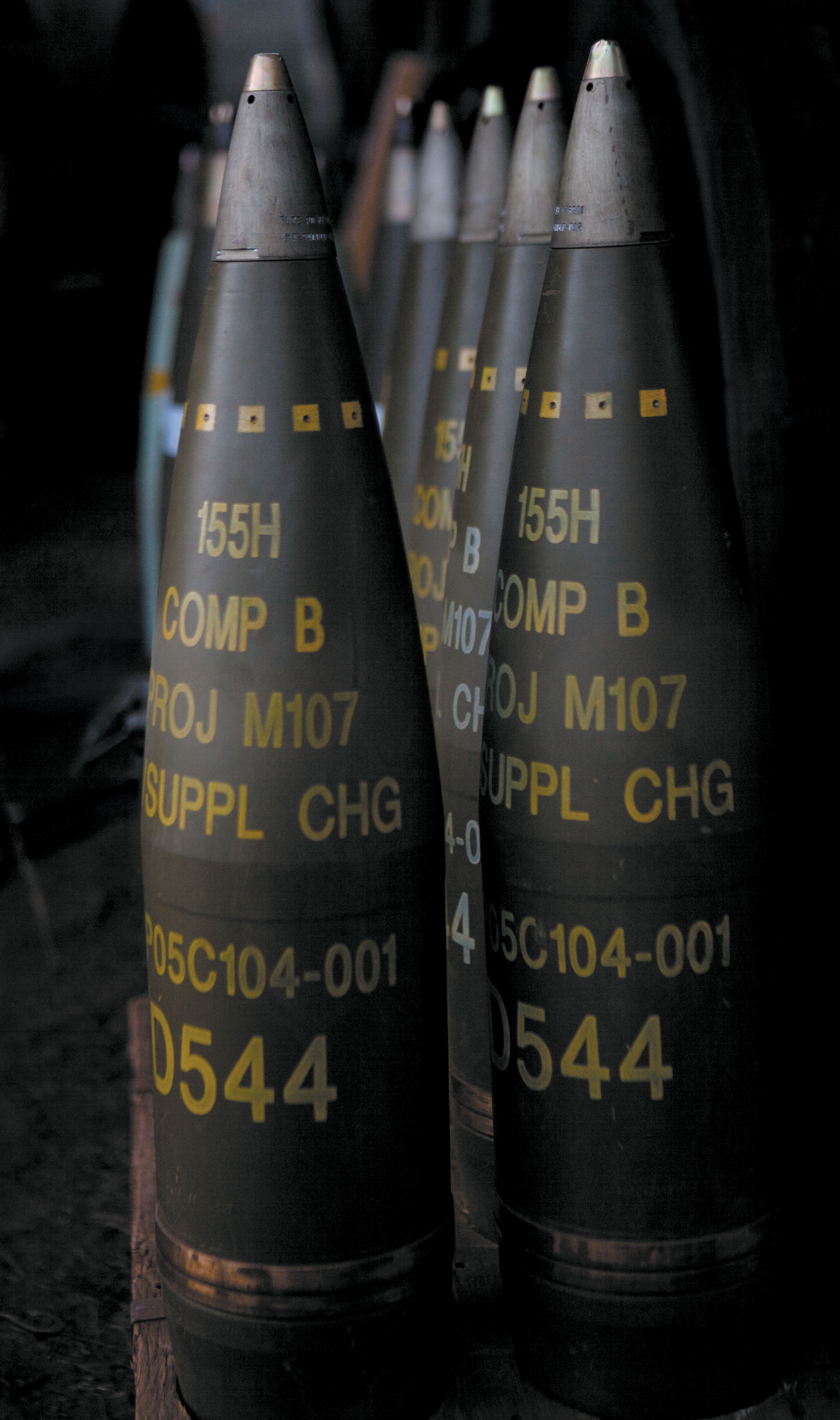
155mm M107 projectiles, with fuzes fitted.

A shell, in a modern military context, is a projectile whose payload contains an explosive, incendiary, or other chemical filling. Originally it was called a bombshell, but "shell" has come to be unambiguous in a military context. A shell can hold a tracer.

All explosive- and incendiary-filled projectiles, particularly for mortars, were originally called grenades, derived from the French word for pomegranate, so called because of the similarity of shape and that the multi-seeded fruit resembles the powder-filled, fragmentizing bomb. Words cognate with grenade are still used for an artillery or mortar projectile in some European languages.

Shells are usually large-caliber projectiles fired by artillery, armoured fighting vehicles (e.g. tanks, assault guns, and mortar carriers), warships, and autocannons. The shape is usually a cylinder topped by an ogive-tipped nose cone for good aerodynamic performance, and possibly with a tapered boat tail; but some specialized types differ widely.

== Background ==
Gunpowder is a low explosive, meaning it will not create a concussive, brisant explosion unless it is contained, as in a modern-day pipe bomb or pressure cooker bomb. Early grenades were hollow cast-iron balls filled with gunpowder, and "shells" were similar devices designed to be shot from artillery in place of solid cannonballs ("shot"). Metonymically, the term "shell", from the casing, came to mean the entire munition.

In a gunpowder-based shell, the casing was intrinsic to generating the explosion, and thus had to be strong and thick. Its fragments could do considerable damage, but each shell broke into only a few large pieces. Further developments led to shells which would fragment into smaller pieces. The advent of high explosives such as TNT removed the need for a pressure-holding casing, so the casing of later shells only needed to contain the munition, and, if desired, to produce shrapnel. The term "shell," however, was sufficiently established that it remained as the term for such munitions.

Hollow shells filled with gunpowder needed a fuse that was either impact triggered (percussion) or time delayed. Percussion fuses with a spherical projectile presented a challenge because there was no way of ensuring that the impact mechanism contacted the target. Therefore, ball shells needed a time fuse that was ignited before or during firing and burned until the shell reached its target.

== Early shells ==
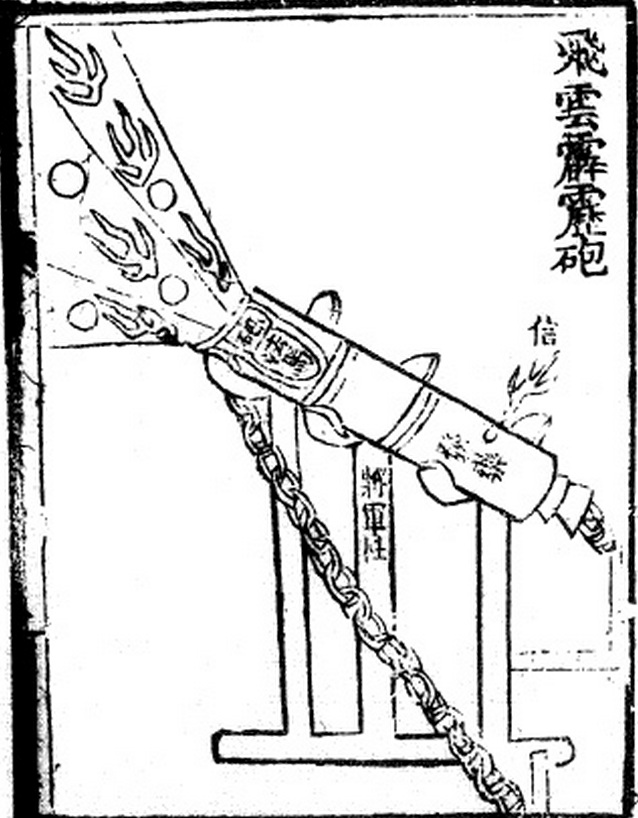
The "flying-cloud thunderclap-eruptor" cannon from the Huolongjing

Cast iron shells packed with gunpowder have been used in warfare since at least early 13th century China. Hollow, gunpowder-packed shells made of cast iron used during the Song dynasty (960–1279) are described in the early Ming Dynasty Chinese military manual Huolongjing, written in the mid 14th century. The History of Jin 《金史》 (compiled by 1345) states that in 1232, as the Mongol general Subutai (1176–1248) descended on the Jin stronghold of Kaifeng, the defenders had a "thunder crash bomb" which "consisted of gunpowder put into an iron container ... then when the fuse was lit (and the projectile shot off) there was a great explosion the noise whereof was like thunder, audible for more than thirty miles, and the vegetation was scorched and blasted by the heat over an area of more than half a mou. When hit, even iron armour was quite pierced through." Archaeological examples of these shells from the 13th century Mongol invasions of Japan have been recovered from a shipwreck.

Shells were used in combat by the Republic of Venice at Jadra in 1376. Shells with fuses were used at the 1421 siege of St Boniface in Corsica. These were two hollowed hemispheres of stone or bronze held together by an iron hoop. At least since the 16th century grenades made of ceramics or glass were in use in Central Europe. A hoard of several hundred ceramic grenades dated to the 17th century was discovered during building works in front of a bastion of the Bavarian city of Ingolstadt, Germany. Many of the grenades contained their original black-powder loads and igniters. Most probably the grenades were intentionally dumped in the moat of the bastion before the year 1723. An early problem was that there was no means of precisely measuring the time to detonation – reliable fuses did not yet exist, and the burning time of the powder fuse was subject to considerable trial and error. Early powder-burning fuses had to be loaded fuse down to be ignited by firing or a portfire or slow match put down the barrel to light the fuse. Other shells were wrapped in bitumen cloth, which would ignite during the firing and in turn ignite a powder fuse. Nevertheless, shells came into regular use in the 16th century. A 1543 English mortar shell was filled with "wildfire."

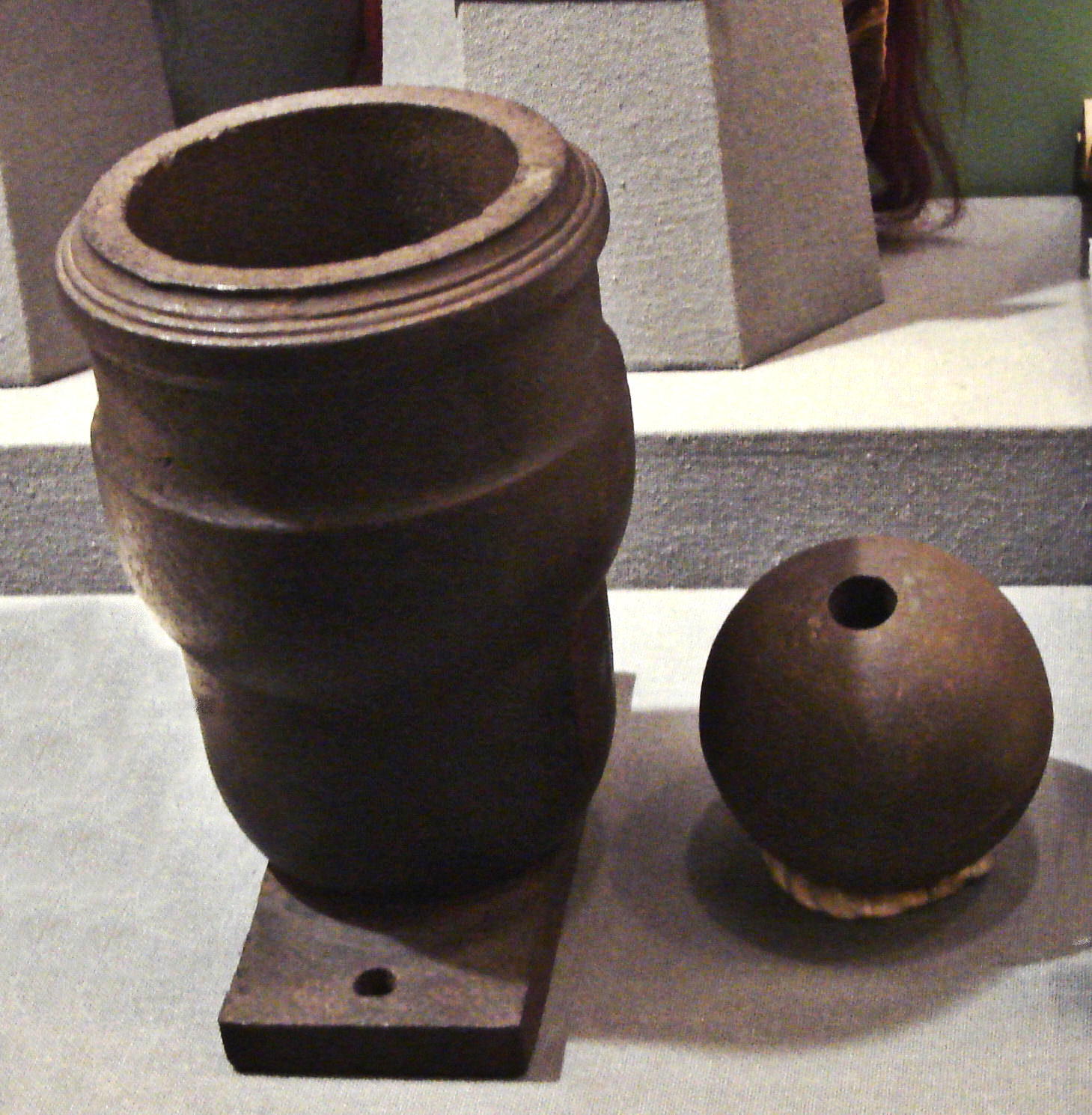
A mortar with a hollowed shell from the Boshin war

By the 18th century, it was known that if loaded toward the muzzle instead, the fuse could be lit by the flash through the windage between the shell and the barrel. At about this time, shells began to be employed for horizontal fire from howitzers with a small propelling charge and, in 1779, experiments demonstrated that they could be used from guns with heavier charges.

The use of exploding shells from field artillery became relatively commonplace from early in the 19th century. Until the mid 19th century, shells remained as simple exploding spheres that used gunpowder, set off by a slow burning fuse. They were usually made of cast iron, but bronze, lead, brass and even glass shell casings were experimented with. The word bomb encompassed them at the time, as heard in the lyrics of The Star-Spangled Banner ("the bombs bursting in air"), although today that sense of bomb is obsolete. Typically, the thickness of the metal body was about a sixth of their diameter, and they were about two-thirds the weight of solid shot of the same caliber.

To ensure that shells were loaded with their fuses toward the muzzle, they were attached to wooden bottoms called sabots. In 1819, a committee of British artillery officers recognized that they were essential stores and in 1830 Britain standardized sabot thickness as a half-inch. The sabot was also intended to reduce jamming during loading. Despite the use of exploding shells, the use of smoothbore cannons firing spherical projectiles of shot remained the dominant artillery method until the 1850s.

== Modern shell ==
The mid–19th century saw a revolution in artillery, with the introduction of the first practical rifled breech loading weapons. The new methods resulted in the reshaping of the spherical shell into its modern recognizable cylindro-conoidal form. This shape greatly improved the in-flight stability of the projectile and meant that the primitive time fuzes could be replaced with the percussion fuze situated in the nose of the shell. The new shape also meant that further, armour-piercing designs could be used.

During the 20th century, shells became increasingly streamlined. In World War I, ogives were typically two circular radius head (crh) – the curve was a segment of a circle having a radius of twice the shell caliber. After that war, ogive shapes became more complex and elongated. From the 1960s, higher quality steels were introduced by some countries for their HE shells, this enabled thinner shell walls with less weight of metal and hence a greater weight of explosive. Ogives were further elongated to improve their ballistic performance.

=== Rifled breech loaders ===
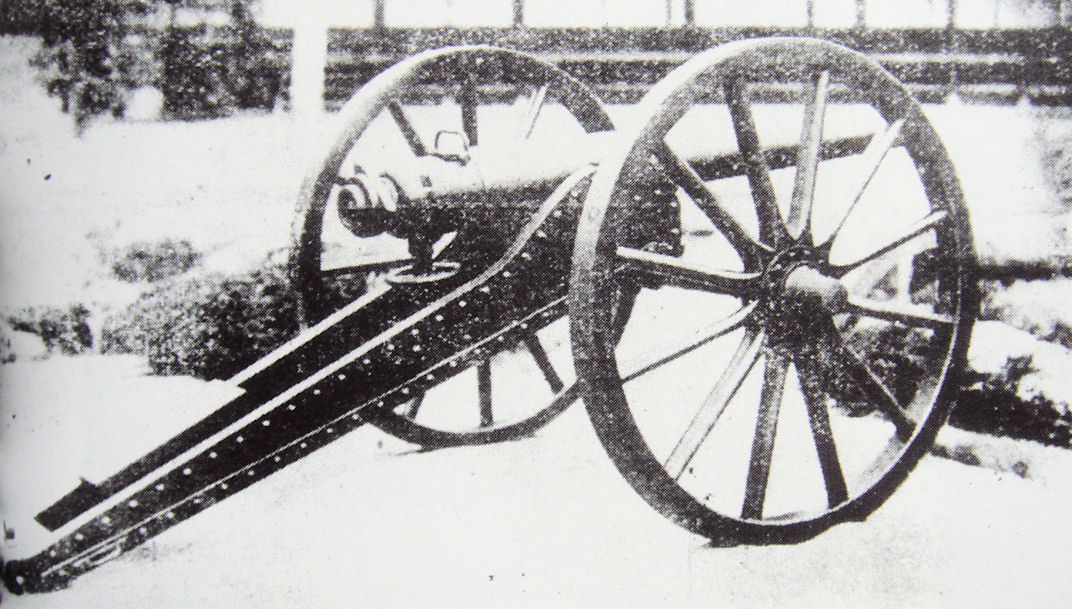
The Armstrong gun was a pivotal development for modern artillery as the first practical rifled breech loader. Pictured, deployed by Japan during the Boshin war (1868–69).

Advances in metallurgy in the industrial era allowed for the construction of rifled breech-loading guns that could fire at a much greater muzzle velocity. After the British artillery was shown up in the Crimean War as having barely changed since the Napoleonic Wars, the industrialist William Armstrong was awarded a contract by the government to design a new piece of artillery. Production started in 1855 at the Elswick Ordnance Company and the Royal Arsenal at Woolwich.

The piece was rifled, which allowed for a much more accurate and powerful action. Although rifling had been tried on small arms since the 15th century, the necessary machinery to accurately rifle artillery only became available in the mid-19th century. Martin von Wahrendorff and Joseph Whitworth independently produced rifled cannons in the 1840s, but it was Armstrong's gun that was first to see widespread use during the Crimean War. The cast iron shell of the Armstrong gun was similar in shape to a Minié ball and had a thin lead coating which made it fractionally larger than the gun's bore and which engaged with the gun's rifling grooves to impart spin to the shell. This spin, together with the elimination of windage as a result of the tight fit, enabled the gun to achieve greater range and accuracy than existing smooth-bore muzzle-loaders with a smaller powder charge.

The gun was also a breech-loader. Although attempts at breech-loading mechanisms had been made since medieval times, the essential engineering problem was that the mechanism could not withstand the explosive charge. It was only with the advances in metallurgy and precision engineering capabilities during the Industrial Revolution that Armstrong was able to construct a viable solution. Another innovative feature was what Armstrong called its "grip", which was essentially a squeeze bore; the 6 inches of the bore at the muzzle end was of slightly smaller diameter, which centered the shell before it left the barrel and at the same time slightly swaged down its lead coating, reducing its diameter and slightly improving its ballistic qualities.

Rifled guns were also developed elsewhere – by Major Giovanni Cavalli and Baron Martin von Wahrendorff in Sweden, Krupp in Germany and the Wiard gun in the United States. However, rifled barrels required some means of engaging the shell with the rifling. Lead coated shells were used with the Armstrong gun, but were not satisfactory so studded projectiles were adopted. However, these did not seal the gap between shell and barrel. Wads at the shell base were also tried without success.

In 1878, the British adopted a copper "gas-check" at the base of their studded projectiles and in 1879 tried a rotating gas check to replace the studs, leading to the 1881 automatic gas-check. This was soon followed by the Vavaseur copper driving band as part of the projectile. The driving band rotated the projectile, centered it in the bore and prevented gas escaping forwards. A driving band has to be soft but tough enough to prevent stripping by rotational and engraving stresses. Copper is generally most suitable but cupronickel or gilding metal were also used.

=== Percussion fuze ===
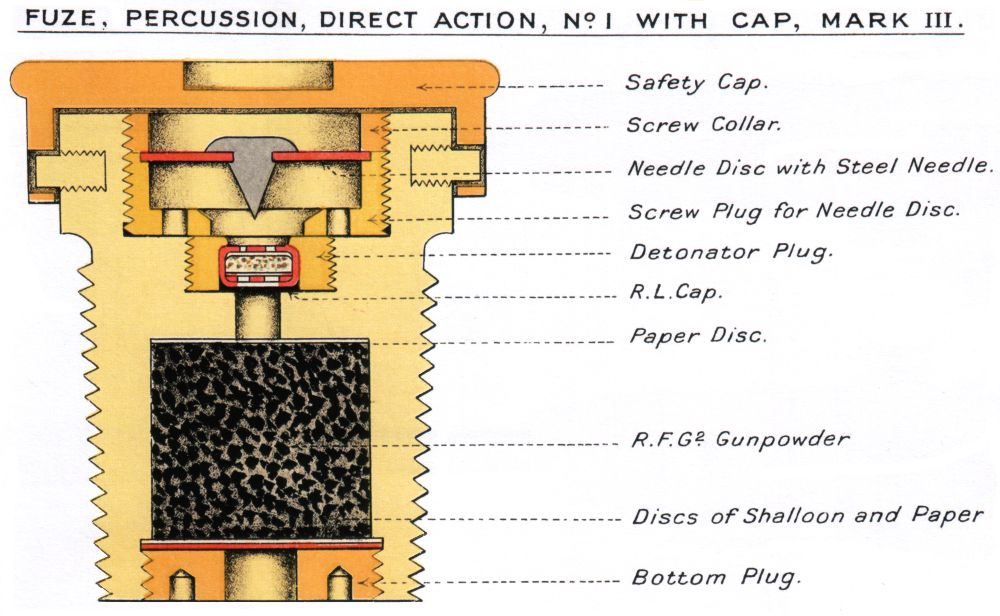
Early British "direct action" nose impact fuze of 1900 with no safety or arming mechanism, relying on heavy direct physical impact to detonate

Although an early percussion fuze appeared in 1650 that used a flint to create sparks to ignite the powder, the shell had to fall in a particular way for this to work and this did not work with spherical projectiles. An additional problem was finding a suitably stable "percussion powder". Progress was not possible until the discovery of mercury fulminate in 1800, leading to priming mixtures for small arms patented by the Rev Alexander Forsyth, and the copper percussion cap in 1818.

The percussion fuze was adopted by Britain in 1842. Many designs were jointly examined by the army and navy, but were unsatisfactory, probably because of the safety and arming features. However, in 1846 the design by Quartermaster Freeburn of the Royal Artillery was adopted by the army. It was a wooden fuze about 6 inches long and used shear wire to hold blocks between the fuze magazine and a burning match. The match was ignited by propellant flash and the shear wire broke on impact. A British naval percussion fuze made of metal did not appear until 1861.

==== Types of fuzes ====
- Percussion fuzes
  - Direct action fuzes
  - Graze fuzes
  - Delay fuzes
  - Base fuzes
- Airburst fuzes
  - Time fuzes
  - Proximity fuzes
  - Distance measuring fuzes
  - Electronic time fuzes

=== Smokeless powders ===
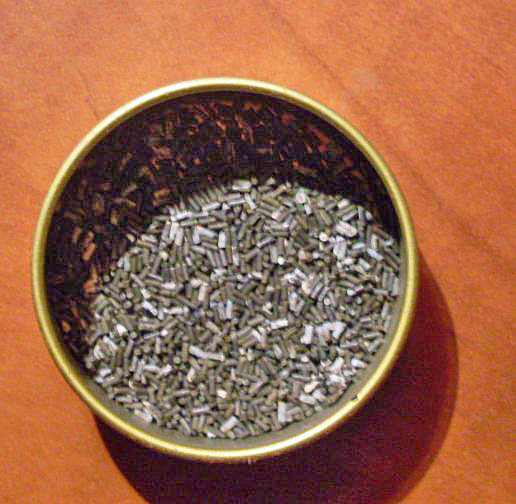
Poudre B was the first practical smokeless powder

Gunpowder was used as the only form of explosive up until the end of the 19th century. Guns using black powder ammunition would have their view obscured by a huge cloud of smoke and concealed shooters were given away by a cloud of smoke over the firing position. Guncotton, a nitrocellulose-based material, was discovered by Swiss chemist Christian Friedrich Schönbein in 1846. He promoted its use as a blasting explosive and sold manufacturing rights to the Austrian Empire. Guncotton was more powerful than gunpowder, but at the same time was somewhat more unstable. John Taylor obtained an English patent for guncotton; and John Hall & Sons began manufacture in Faversham. British interest waned after an explosion destroyed the Faversham factory in 1847. Austrian Baron Wilhelm Lenk von Wolfsberg built two guncotton plants producing artillery propellant, but it was dangerous under field conditions, and guns that could fire thousands of rounds using gunpowder would reach their service life after only a few hundred shots with the more powerful guncotton.

Small arms could not withstand the pressures generated by guncotton. After one of the Austrian factories blew up in 1862, Thomas Prentice & Company began manufacturing guncotton in Stowmarket in 1863; and British War Office chemist Sir Frederick Abel began thorough research at Waltham Abbey Royal Gunpowder Mills leading to a manufacturing process that eliminated the impurities in nitrocellulose making it safer to produce and a stable product safer to handle. Abel patented this process in 1865, when the second Austrian guncotton factory exploded. After the Stowmarket factory exploded in 1871, Waltham Abbey began production of guncotton for torpedo and mine warheads.

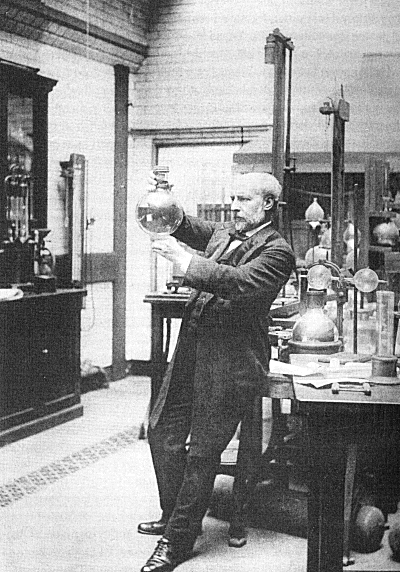
Sir James Dewar developed the cordite explosive in 1889

In 1884, Paul Vieille invented a smokeless powder called Poudre B (short for poudre blanche—white powder, as distinguished from black powder) made from 68.2% insoluble nitrocellulose, 29.8% soluble nitrocellulose gelatinized with ether and 2% paraffin. This was adopted for the Lebel rifle. Vieille's powder revolutionized the effectiveness of small guns, because it gave off almost no smoke and was three times more powerful than black powder. Higher muzzle velocity meant a flatter trajectory and less wind drift and bullet drop, making 1000 meter shots practicable. Other European countries swiftly followed and started using their own versions of Poudre B, the first being Germany and Austria which introduced new weapons in 1888. Subsequently, Poudre B was modified several times with various compounds being added and removed. Krupp began adding diphenylamine as a stabilizer in 1888.

Britain conducted trials on all the various types of propellant brought to their attention, but were dissatisfied with them all and sought something superior to all existing types. In 1889, Sir Frederick Abel, James Dewar and W. Kellner patented (No. 5614 and No. 11,664 in the names of Abel and Dewar) a new formulation that was manufactured at the Royal Gunpowder Factory at Waltham Abbey. It entered British service in 1891 as Cordite Mark 1. Its main composition was 58% nitro-glycerine, 37% guncotton and 3% mineral jelly. A modified version, Cordite MD, entered service in 1901, this increased guncotton to 65% and reduced nitro-glycerine to 30%, this change reduced the combustion temperature and hence erosion and barrel wear. Cordite could be made to burn more slowly which reduced maximum pressure in the chamber (hence lighter breeches, etc.), but longer high pressure – significant improvements over gunpowder. Cordite could be made in any desired shape or size. The creation of cordite led to a lengthy court battle between Nobel, Maxim, and another inventor over alleged British patent infringement.

== Other shell types ==
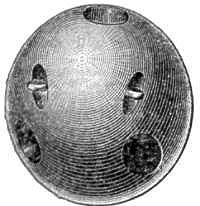
Drawing of a carcass shell

A variety of fillings have been used in shells throughout history. An incendiary shell was invented by Valturio in 1460. The carcass shell was first used by the French under Louis XIV in 1672. Initially in the shape of an oblong in an iron frame (with poor ballistic properties) it evolved into a spherical shell. Their use continued well into the 19th century.

A modern version of the incendiary shell was developed in 1857 by the British and was known as Martin's shell after its inventor. The shell was filled with molten iron and was intended to break up on impact with an enemy ship, splashing molten iron on the target. It was used by the Royal Navy between 1860 and 1869, replacing heated shot as an anti-ship, incendiary projectile.

Two patterns of incendiary shell were used by the British in World War I, one designed for use against Zeppelins.

Similar to incendiary shells were star shells, designed for illumination rather than arson. Sometimes called lightballs they were in use from the 17th century onwards. The British adopted parachute lightballs in 1866 for 10-, 8- and 5 1/2-inch calibers. The 10-inch was not officially declared obsolete until 1920.

Smoke balls also date back to the 17th century, British ones contained a mix of saltpetre, coal, pitch, tar, resin, sawdust, crude antimony and sulphur. They produced a "noisome smoke in abundance that is impossible to bear". In 19th-century British service, they were made of concentric paper with a thickness about 1/15th of the total diameter and filled with powder, saltpeter, pitch, coal and tallow. They were used to 'suffocate or expel the enemy in casemates, mines or between decks; for concealing operations; and as signals.

During the First World War, shrapnel shells and explosive shells inflicted terrible casualties on infantry, accounting for nearly 70% of all war casualties and leading to the adoption of steel combat helmets on both sides. Frequent problems with shells led to many military disasters with dud shells, most notably during the 1916 Battle of the Somme. Shells filled with poison gas were used from 1917 onwards.

== Propulsion ==
Artillery shells are differentiated by how the shell is loaded and propelled, and the type of breech mechanism.

=== Fixed ammunition ===
Fixed ammunition has three main components: the fuzed projectile, the casing to hold the propellants and primer, and the single propellant charge. Everything is included in a ready-to-use package and in British ordnance terms is called fixed quick firing. Often guns which use fixed ammunition use sliding-block or sliding-wedge breeches and the case provides obturation which seals the breech of the gun and prevents propellant gasses from escaping. Sliding block breeches can be horizontal or vertical. Advantages of fixed ammunition are simplicity, safety, moisture resistance and speed of loading. Disadvantages are eventually a fixed round becomes too long or too heavy to load by a gun crew. Another issue is the inability to vary propellant charges to achieve different velocities and ranges. Lastly, there is the issue of resource usage since a fixed round uses a case, which can be an issue in a prolonged war if there are metal shortages.

=== Separate loading cased charge ===
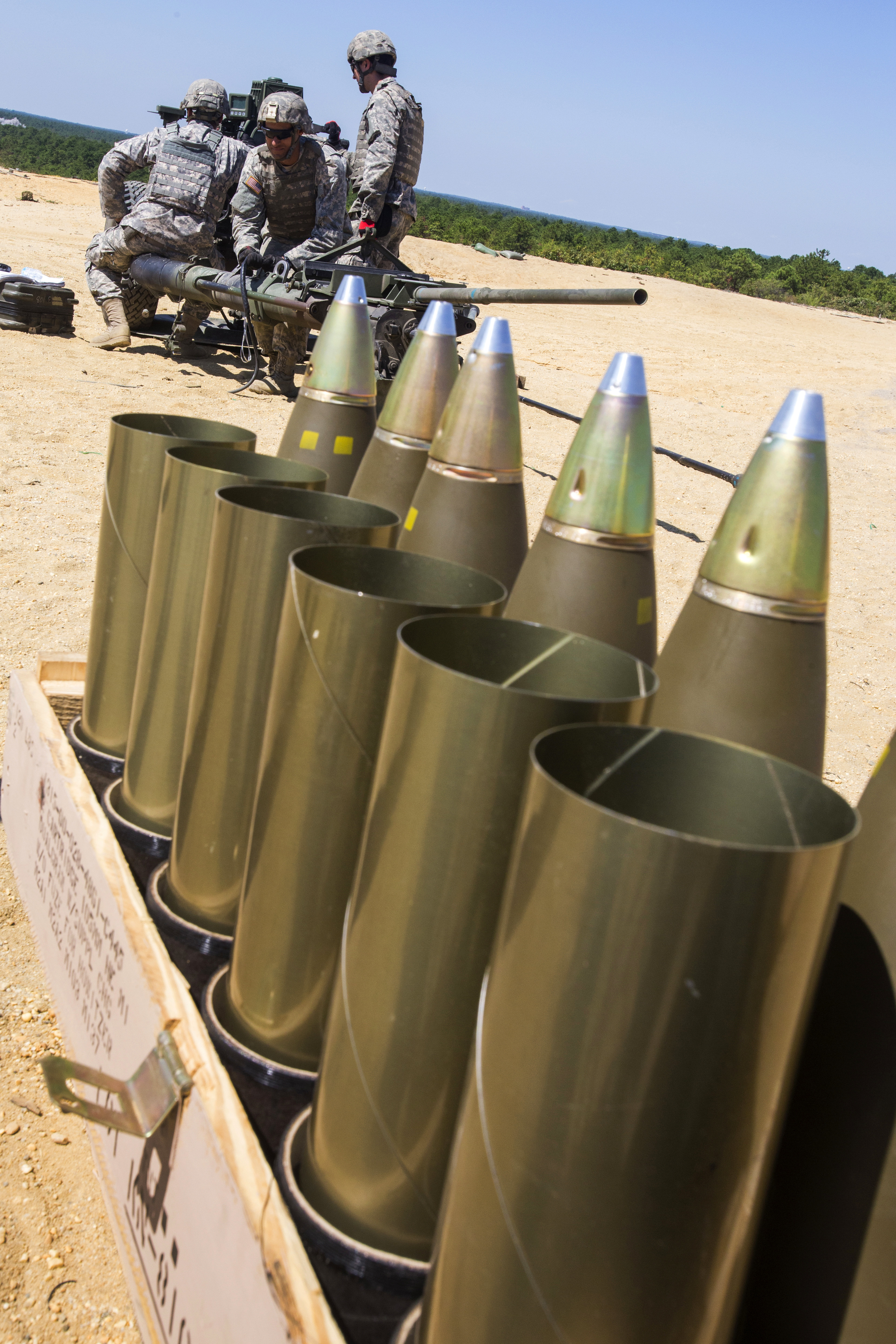
Semi-fixed ammunition for the M119 howitzer, with the propellant cases and projectiles separated

Separate loading cased charge ammunition has three main components: the fuzed projectile, the casing to hold the propellants and primer, and the bagged propellant charges. The components are usually separated into two or more parts. In British ordnance terms, this type of ammunition is called separate quick firing. Often guns which use separate loading cased charge ammunition use sliding-block or sliding-wedge breeches and during World War I and World War II Germany predominantly used fixed or separate loading cased charges and sliding block breeches even for their largest guns. A variant of separate loading cased charge ammunition is semi-fixed ammunition. With semi-fixed ammunition the round comes as a complete package but the projectile and its case can be separated. The case holds a set number of bagged charges and the gun crew can add or subtract propellant to change range and velocity. The round is then reassembled, loaded, and fired. Advantages include easier handling for larger caliber rounds, while range and velocity can easily be varied by increasing or decreasing the number of propellant charges. Disadvantages include more complexity, slower loading, less safety, less moisture resistance, and the metal cases can still be a material resource issue.

=== Separate loading bagged charge ===
In separate loading bagged charge ammunition there are three main components: the fuzed projectile, the bagged charges and the primer. Like separate loading cased charge ammunition, the number of propellant charges can be varied. However, this style of ammunition does not use a cartridge case and it achieves obturation through a screw breech instead of a sliding block. Sometimes when reading about artillery the term separate loading ammunition will be used without clarification of whether a cartridge case is used or not, in which case it refers to the type of breech used. Heavy artillery pieces and naval artillery tend to use bagged charges and projectiles because the weight and size of the projectiles and propelling charges can be more than a gun crew can manage. Advantages include easier handling for large rounds, decreased metal usage, while range and velocity can be varied by using more or fewer propellant charges. Disadvantages include more complexity, slower loading, less safety and less moisture resistance.

=== Range-enhancing technologies ===
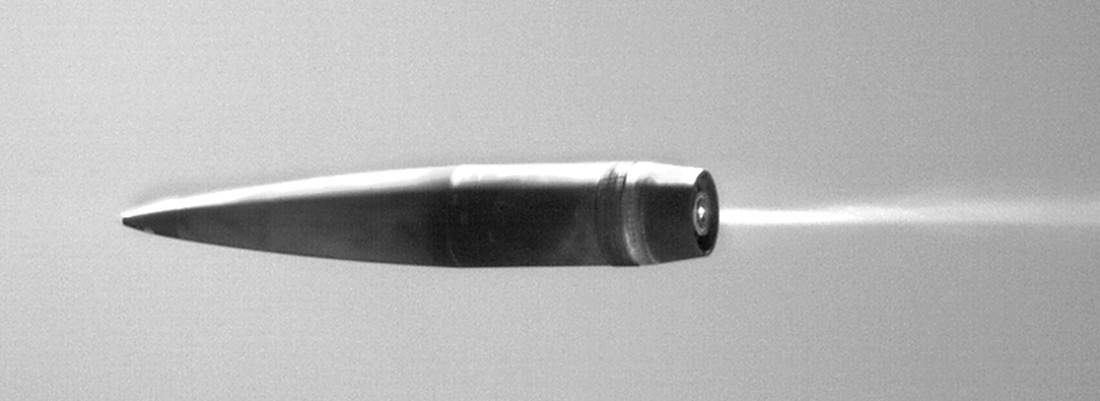
XM1113 extended-range artillery round, shown here at a range demonstration, uses a rocket-assist motor

Extended-range shells are sometimes used. Two primary types exist: rocket-assisted projectiles (RAP), which generate additional thrust via a rocket motor built into the base, and base bleed (BB), which reduce base drag by expelling gas into the low-pressure area behind the shell. These shell designs usually have reduced high-explosive filling to remain within the permitted mass for the projectile, and hence less lethality.

== Sizes ==
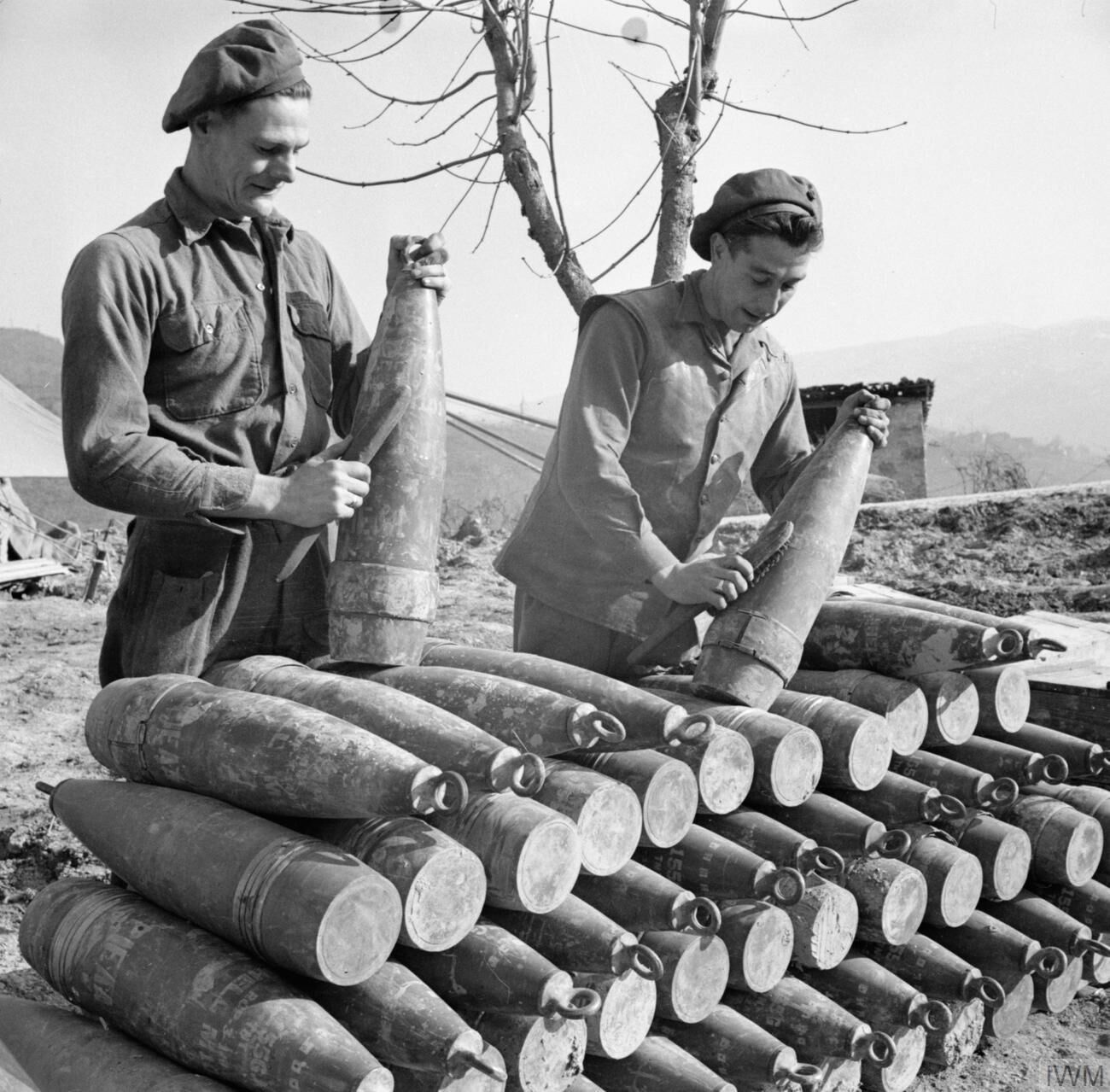
British gun crew preparing 155 mm shells at Vergato, Italy during the Liberation of Italy, 22 February 1945

The caliber of a shell is its diameter. Depending on the historical period and national preferences, this may be specified in millimeters, centimeters, or inches. The length of gun barrels for large cartridges and shells (naval) is frequently quoted in terms of the ratio of the barrel length to the bore size, also called caliber. For example, the 16"/50 caliber Mark 7 gun is 50 calibers long, that is, 16"×50=800"=66.7 feet long. Some guns, mainly British, were specified by the weight of their shells (see below).

Explosive rounds as small as 12.7 x 82 mm and 13 x 64 mm have been used on aircraft and armoured vehicles, but their small explosive yields have led some nations to limit their explosive rounds to 20mm (.78 in) or larger. International Law precludes the use of explosive ammunition for use against individual persons, but not against vehicles and aircraft. The largest shells ever fired during war were those from the German super-railway guns, Gustav and Dora, which were 800 mm (31.5 in) in caliber. Very large shells have been replaced by rockets, missiles, and bombs. Today shells exceeding 155 mm (6.1 in) are much less commonly used, with the exception of certain dated legacy systems. The 203mm Soviet-era 2S7 Pion is a noteworthy example, seeing regular usage throughout the Russo-Ukrainian War by the armed forces of both countries. Ukraine was able to continue fielding these heavy howitzers thanks to 203mm shells donated by the US, formerly used by the now-retired M110 howitzer.

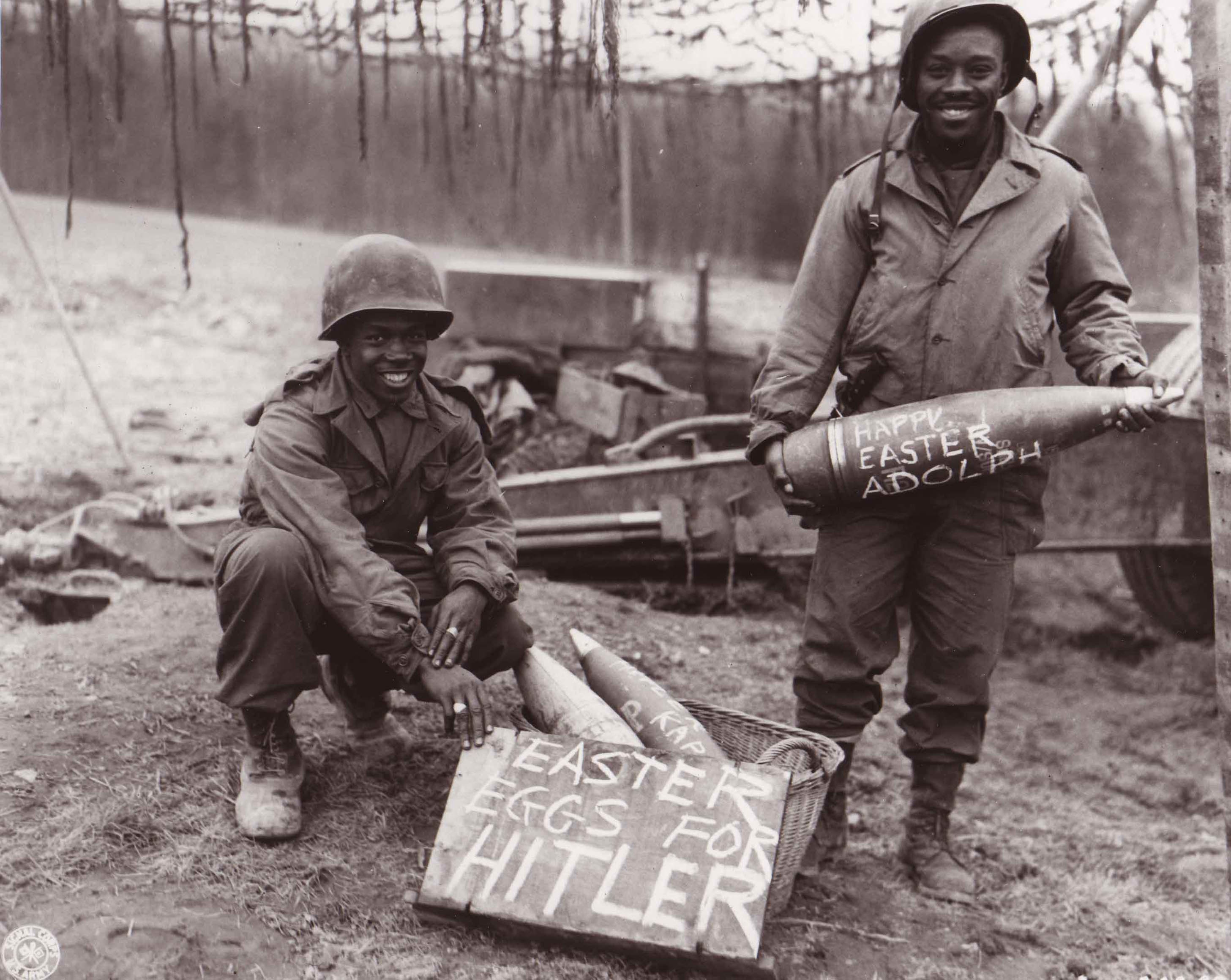
American soldiers with 155 mm artillery shells, 10 March 1945

Gun calibers have standardized around a few common sizes, especially in the larger range, mainly due to the uniformity required for efficient military logistics. Shells of 105 and 155 mm for artillery with 105 and 120 mm for tank guns are common in NATO allied countries. Shells of 122, 130, and 152 mm for artillery with 100, 115, and 125 mm for tank guns, remain in common usage among the regions of Eastern Europe, Western Asia, Northern Africa, and Eastern Asia. Most common calibers have been in use for many decades, since it is logistically complex to change the caliber of all guns and ammunition stores.

The weight of shells increases by and large with caliber. A typical 155 mm (6.1 in) shell weighs about 50 kg (110 lbs), a common 203 mm (8 in) shell about 100 kg (220 lbs), a concrete demolition 203 mm (8 in) shell 146 kg (322 lbs), a 280 mm (11 in) battleship shell about 300 kg (661 lbs), and a 460 mm (18 in) battleship shell over 1,500 kg (3,307 lbs). The Schwerer Gustav large-calibre gun fired shells that weighed between 4,800 kg (10,582 lbs) and 7,100 kg (15,653 lbs).

During the 19th century, the British adopted a particular form of designating artillery. Field guns were designated by nominal standard projectile weight, while howitzers were designated by barrel caliber. British guns and their ammunition were designated in pounds, e.g., as "two-pounder" shortened to "2-pr" or "2-pdr". Usually, this referred to the actual weight of the standard projectile (shot, shrapnel, or high explosive), but, confusingly, this was not always the case.

Some were named after the weights of obsolete projectile types of the same caliber, or even obsolete types that were considered to have been functionally equivalent. Also, projectiles fired from the same gun, but of non-standard weight, took their name from the gun. Thus, conversion from "pounds" to an actual barrel diameter requires consulting a historical reference. A mixture of designations were in use for land artillery from the First World War (such as the BL 60-pounder gun, RML 2.5 inch Mountain Gun, 4 inch gun, 4.5 inch howitzer) through to the end of World War II (5.5 inch medium gun, 25-pounder gun-howitzer, 17-pounder tank gun), but the majority of naval guns were by caliber. After the end of World War II, field guns were designated by caliber.

== Types ==
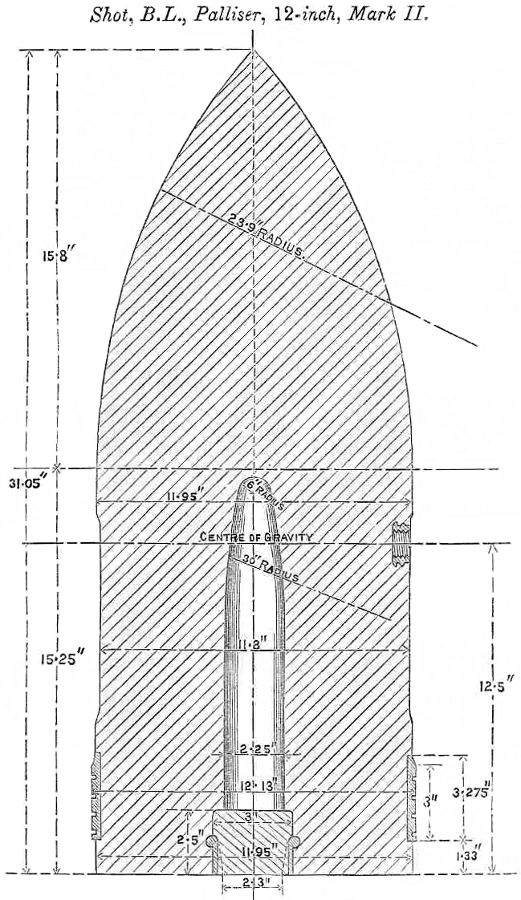
Palliser shot for the BL 12 inch naval gun Mk I - VII, 1886

There are many different types of shells. The principal ones include:

=== Armour-piercing shells ===
With the introduction of the first ironclads in the 1850s and 1860s, it became clear that shells had to be designed to effectively pierce the ship armour. A series of British tests in 1863 demonstrated that the way forward lay with high-velocity lighter shells. The first pointed armour-piercing shell was introduced by Major Palliser in 1863. Approved in 1867, Palliser shot and shell was an improvement over the ordinary elongated shot of the time. Palliser shot was made of cast iron, the head being chilled in casting to harden it, using composite molds with a metal, water cooled portion for the head.

Britain also deployed Palliser shells in the 1870s–1880s. In the shell, the cavity was slightly larger than in the shot and was filled with 1.5% gunpowder instead of being empty, to provide a small explosive effect after penetrating armour plating. The shell was correspondingly slightly longer than the shot to compensate for the lighter cavity. The powder filling was ignited by the shock of impact and hence did not require a fuze. However, ship armour rapidly improved during the 1880s and 1890s, and it was realised that explosive shells with steel had advantages including better fragmentation and resistance to the stresses of firing. These were cast and forged steel.

AP shells containing an explosive filling were initially distinguished from their non-HE counterparts by being called a "shell" as opposed to "shot". By the time of the Second World War, AP shells with a bursting charge were sometimes distinguished by appending the suffix "HE". At the beginning of the war, APHE was common in anti-tank shells of 75 mm caliber and larger due to the similarity with the much larger naval armour piercing shells already in common use. As the war progressed, ordnance design evolved so that the bursting charges in APHE became ever smaller to non-existent, especially in smaller caliber shells, e.g. Panzergranate 39 with only 0.2% HE filling.

==== Types of armour-piercing ammunition ====
- Solid shell ("shot") - a solid penetrator that uses only initial impact energy to penetrate armour
  - Armour-piercing (AP)
  - Armour-piercing ballistic capped (APBC) - a shot with a cover to improve aerodynamics
  - Armour-piercing capped (APC)
  - Armour-piercing capped ballistic capped (APCBC)
  - Armour-piercing composite rigid (APCR), also known as High-Velocity Armour-Piercing (HVAP)
  - Armour-piercing composite non-rigid (APCNR), also known as Armour-Piercing Super-Velocity (APSV) - fired from a tapering barrel
  - Armour-piercing discarding sabot (APDS)
  - Armour-piercing fin-stabilized discarding sabot (APFSDS)
- Hard shell with explosives – a mostly solid shell with an explosive element that detonates, after the shell has penetrated the armour using its impact velocity
  - Armour-piercing high-explosive (APHE)
  - Armour-piercing high-explosive tracer (APHE-T) - an APHE with tracer in base
  - Semi-armour-piercing (SAP)
  - Semi-armour-piercing high-explosive (SAPHE)
  - Semi-armour-piercing high-explosive incendiary (SAPHEI)
  - Semi-armour-piercing high-explosive incendiary tracer (SAPHEI-T)
- Indirect-penetration shell – a shell with a mechanism that is triggered upon impact to cause damage behind armour
  - High-explosive anti-tank (HEAT)
  - High-explosive squash head (HESH), also known as High-explosive plastic/plasticized (HEP)

=== High-explosive shells ===
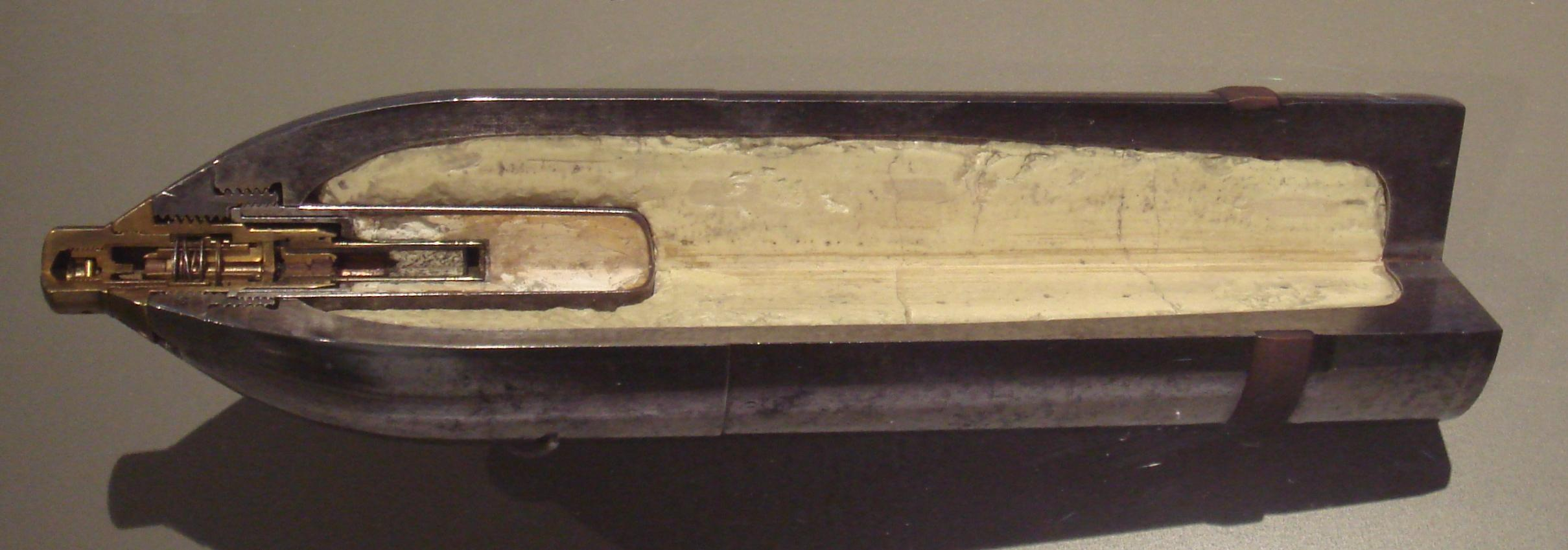
Picric acid was used in the first high-explosive shells. Cut out section of a high-explosive shell belonging to a Canon de 75 modèle 1897.

Although smokeless powders were used as a propellant, they could not be used as the substance for the explosive warhead, because shock sensitivity sometimes caused detonation in the artillery barrel at the time of firing. Picric acid was the first high-explosive nitrated organic compound widely considered suitable to withstand the shock of firing in conventional artillery. In 1885, based on research of Hermann Sprengel, French chemist Eugène Turpin patented the use of pressed and cast picric acid in blasting charges and artillery shells. In 1887, the French government adopted a mixture of picric acid and guncotton under the name Melinite. In 1888, Britain started manufacturing a very similar mixture in Lydd, Kent, under the name Lyddite.

Japan followed with an "improved" formula known as shimose powder. In 1889, a similar material, a mixture of ammonium cresylate with trinitrocresol, or an ammonium salt of trinitrocresol, started to be manufactured under the name ecrasite in Austria-Hungary. By 1894, Russia was manufacturing artillery shells filled with picric acid. Ammonium picrate (known as Dunnite or explosive D) was used by the United States beginning in 1906. Germany began filling artillery shells with TNT in 1902. Toluene was less readily available than phenol, and TNT is less powerful than picric acid, but the improved safety of munitions manufacturing and storage caused the replacement of picric acid by TNT for most military purposes between the World Wars. However, pure TNT was expensive to produce and most nations made some use of mixtures using cruder TNT and ammonium nitrate, some with other compounds included. These fills included Ammonal, Schneiderite and Amatol. The latter was still in wide use in World War II.

The percentage of shell weight taken up by its explosive fill increased steadily throughout the 20th Century. Less than 10% was usual in the first few decades; by World War II, leading designs were around 15%. However, British researchers in that war identified 25% as being the optimal design for anti-personnel purposes, based on the recognition that far smaller fragments than hitherto would give a better effect. This guideline was achieved by the 1960s with the 155 mm L15 shell, developed as part of the German-British FH-70 program. The key requirement for increasing the HE content without increasing shell weight was to reduce the thickness of shell walls, which required improvements in high tensile steel.

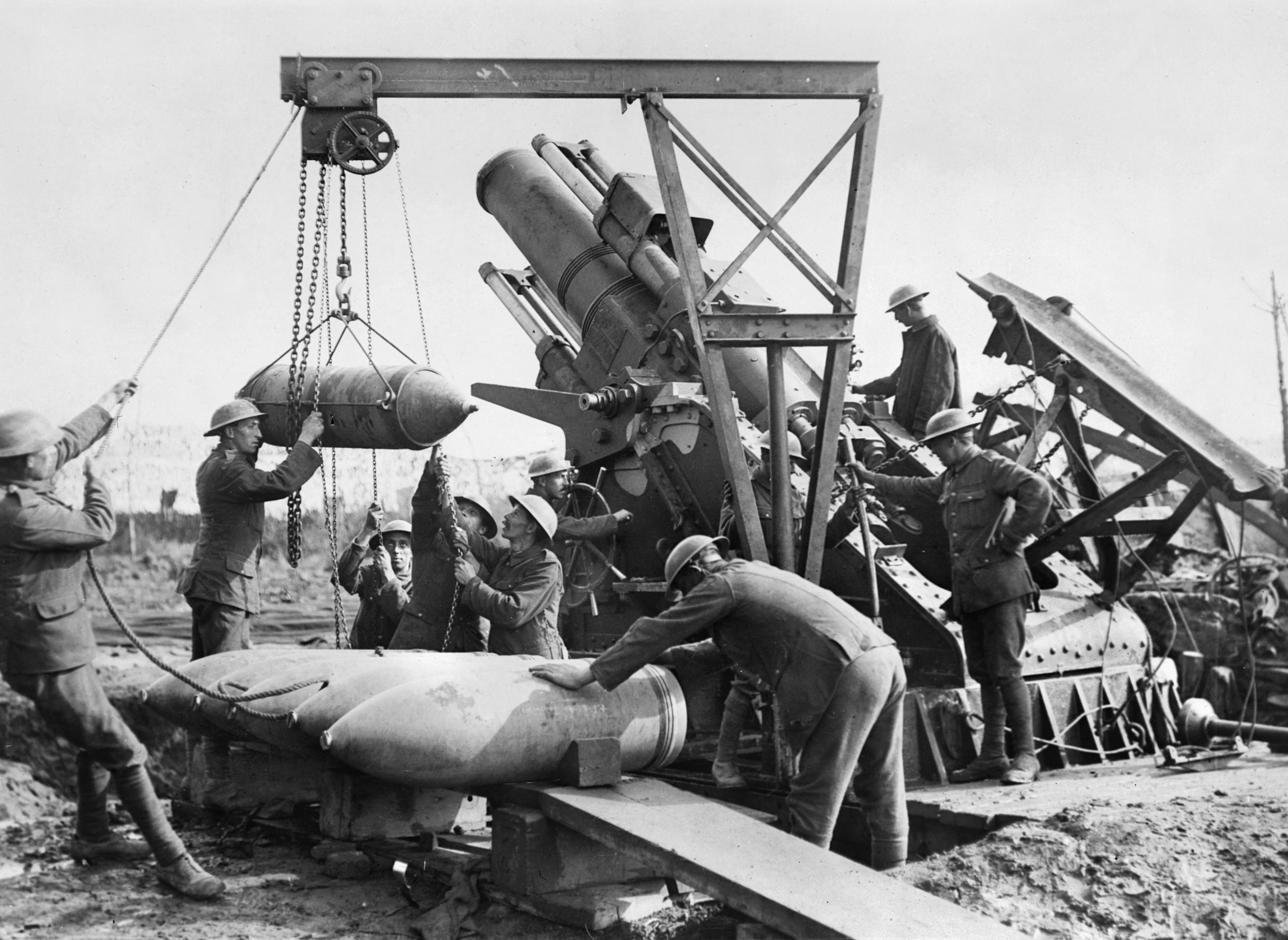
15 inch high-explosive howitzer shells, circa 1917

The most common shell type is high explosive, commonly referred to simply as HE. They have a strong steel case, a bursting charge, and a fuse. The fuse detonates the bursting charge which shatters the case and scatters hot, sharp case pieces (fragments, splinters) at high velocity. Most of the damage to soft targets, such as unprotected personnel, is caused by shell pieces rather than by the blast. The term "shrapnel" is sometimes used to describe the shell pieces, but shrapnel shells functioned very differently and are long obsolete. The speed of fragments is limited by Gurney equations. Depending on the type of fuse used the HE shell can be set to burst on the ground (percussion), in the air above the ground, which is called air burst (time or proximity), or after penetrating a short distance into the ground (percussion with delay, either to transmit more ground shock to covered positions, or to reduce the spread of fragments). Projectiles with enhanced fragmentation are called high-explosive fragmentation (HE-FRAG).

RDX and TNT mixtures are the standard chemicals used, notably Composition B and Cyclotol. The introduction of "insensitive munition" requirements, agreements and regulations in the 1990s caused modern western designs to use various types of plastic bonded explosives (PBX) based on RDX.

==== Common ====
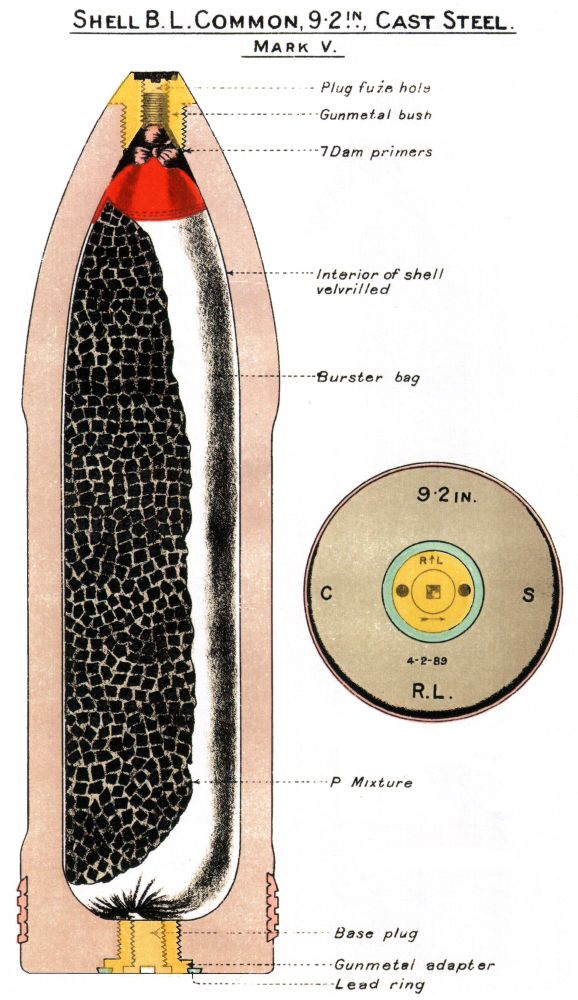
BL 9.2 in common shell Mk V

Common shells designated in the early (i.e. 1800s) British explosive shells were filled with "low explosives" such as "P mixture" (gunpowder) and usually with a fuze in the nose. Common shells on bursting (non-detonating) tended to break into relatively large fragments which continued along the shell's trajectory rather than laterally. They had some incendiary effect.

In the late 19th century "double common shells" were developed, lengthened so as to approach twice the standard shell weight, to carry more powder and hence increase explosive effect. They suffered from instability in flight and low velocity and were not widely used.

In 1914, common shells with a diameter of 6-inches and larger were of cast steel, while smaller diameter shells were of forged steel for service and cast iron for practice. They were replaced by "common lyddite" shells in the late 1890s but some stocks remained as late as 1914. In British service common shells were typically painted black with a red band behind the nose to indicate the shell was filled.

==== Common pointed ====
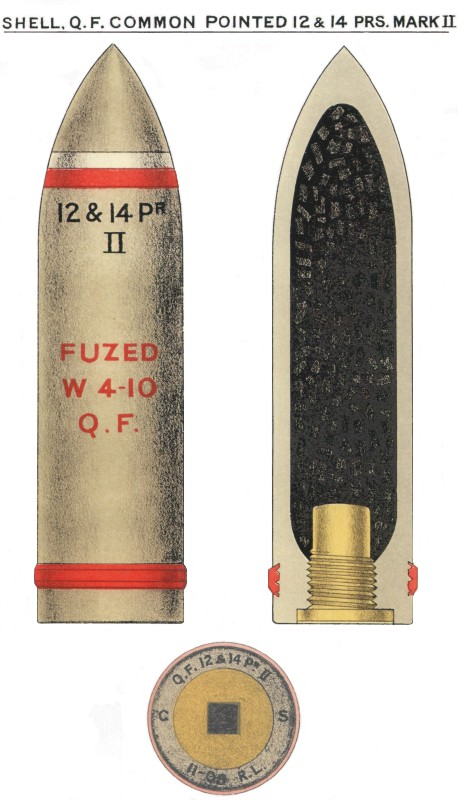
QF 12-pounder common pointed shell

Common pointed shells, or CP were a type of common shell used in naval service from the 1890s – 1910s which had a solid nose and a percussion fuze in the base rather than the common shell's nose fuze. The ogival two C.R.H. solid pointed nose was considered suitable for attacking shipping but was not armour-piercing – the main function was still explosive. They were of cast or forged (three- and six-pounder) steel and contained a gunpowder bursting charge slightly smaller than that of a common shell, a trade off for the longer heavier nose.

In British service common pointed shells were typically painted black, except 12-pounder shells specific for QF guns which were painted lead colour to distinguish them from 12-pounder shells usable with both BL and QF guns. A red ring behind the nose indicated the shell was filled.

By World War II they were superseded in Royal Navy service by common pointed capped (CPC) and semi-armour piercing (SAP), filled with TNT.

==== Common lyddite ====
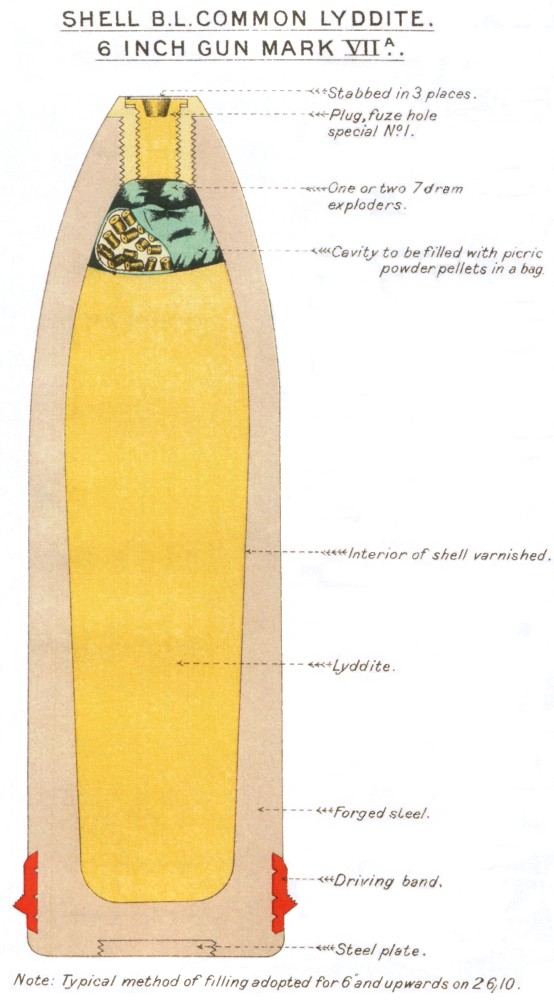
Common lyddite six-inch naval shell

Common lyddite shells were British explosive shells filled with Lyddite were initially designated "common lyddite" and beginning in 1896 were the first British generation of modern "high explosive" shells. Lyddite is picric acid fused at 280 °F (138 °C) and allowed to solidify, producing a much denser dark-yellow form which is not affected by moisture and is easier to detonate than the liquid form. Its French equivalent was "melinite", Japanese equivalent was "shimose". Common lyddite shells "detonated" and fragmented into small pieces in all directions, with no incendiary effect. For maximum destructive effect the explosion needed to be delayed until the shell had penetrated its target.

Early shells had walls of the same thickness for the whole length, later shells had walls thicker at the base and thinning towards the nose. This was found to give greater strength and provide more space for explosive. Later shells had 4 c.r. heads, more pointed and hence streamlined than earlier 2 c.r.h. designs.

Proper detonation of a lyddite shell would show black to grey smoke, or white from the steam of a water detonation. Yellow smoke indicated simple explosion rather than detonation, and failure to reliably detonate was a problem with lyddite, especially in its earlier usage. To improve the detonation "exploders" with a small quantity of picric powder or even of TNT (in smaller shells, 3 pdr, 12 pdr – 4.7 inch) was loaded between the fuze and the main lyddite filling or in a thin tube running through most of the shell's length.

Lyddite presented a major safety problem because it reacted dangerously with metal bases. This required that the interior of shells had to be varnished, the exterior had to be painted with leadless paint and the fuze-hole had to be made of a leadless alloy. Fuzes containing any lead could not be used with it.

When World War I began Britain was replacing lyddite with modern "high explosive" (HE) such as TNT. After World War I the term "common lyddite" was dropped, and remaining stocks of lyddite-filled shells were referred to as HE (high explosive) shell filled lyddite. Hence "common" faded from use, replaced by "HE" as the explosive shell designation.

Common lyddite shells in British service were painted yellow, with a red ring behind the nose to indicate the shell had been filled.

==== Mine shell ====
The mine shell is a particular form of HE shell developed for use in small caliber weapons such as 20 mm to 30 mm cannon. Small HE shells of conventional design can contain only a limited amount of explosive. By using a thin-walled steel casing of high tensile strength, a larger explosive charge can be used. Most commonly the explosive charge also was a more expensive but higher-detonation-energy type.

The mine shell concept was invented by the Germans in the Second World War primarily for use in aircraft guns intended to be fired at opposing aircraft. Mine shells produced relatively little damage due to fragments, but a much more powerful blast. The aluminium structures and skins of Second World War aircraft were readily damaged by this greater level of blast.

=== Shrapnel shells ===
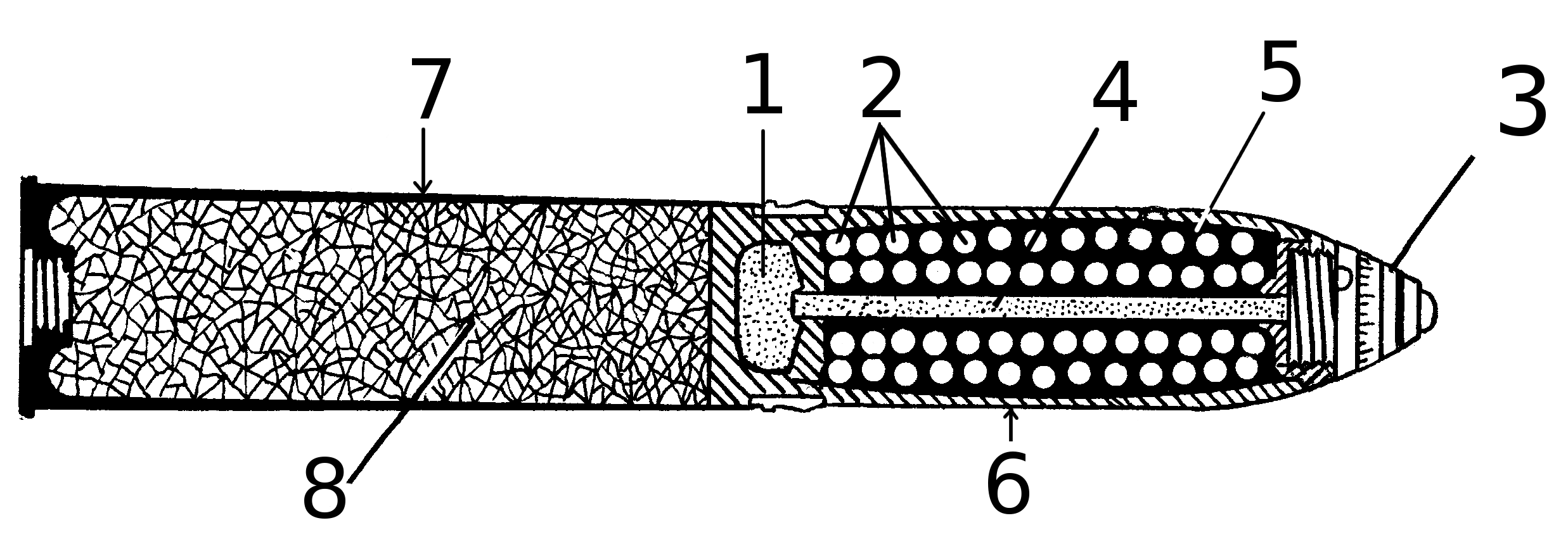
Typical World War I shrapnel round: 1 shell bursting charge 2 bullets 3 nose fuze 4 central ignition tube 5 resin matrix 6 thin steel shell wall 7 cartridge case 8 propellant

Shrapnel shells are an anti-personnel munition which delivered large numbers of bullets at ranges far greater than rifles or machine guns could attain – up to 6,500 yards by 1914. A typical shrapnel shell as used in World War I was streamlined, 75 mm (3 in) in diameter and contained approximately 300 lead–antimony balls (bullets), each around 1/2-inch in diameter. Shrapnel used the principle that the bullets encountered much less air resistance if they travelled most of their journey packed together in a single streamlined shell than they would if they travelled individually, and could hence attain a far greater range.

The gunner set the shell's time fuze so that it was timed to burst as it was angling down towards the ground just before it reached its target (ideally about 150 yards before, and 60–100 feet above the ground). The fuze then ignited a small "bursting charge" in the base of the shell which fired the balls forward out of the front of the shell case, adding 200–250 ft/second to the existing velocity of 750–1200 ft/second. The shell body dropped to the ground mostly intact and the bullets continued in an expanding cone shape before striking the ground over an area approximately 250 yards × 30 yards in the case of the US 3-inch shell. The effect was of a large shotgun blast just in front of and above the target, and was deadly against troops in the open. A trained gun team could fire 20 such shells per minute, with a total of 6,000 balls, which compared very favorably with rifles and machine-guns.

However, shrapnel's relatively flat trajectory (it depended mainly on the shell's velocity for its lethality, and was lethal only in the forward direction) meant that it could not strike trained troops who avoided open spaces and instead used dead ground (dips), shelters, trenches, buildings, and trees for cover. It was of no use in destroying buildings or shelters. Hence, it was replaced during World War I by the high-explosive shell, which exploded its fragments in all directions (and thus more difficult to avoid) and could be fired by high-angle weapons, such as howitzers.

=== Cluster and sub-munition ===
Cluster shells are a type of carrier shell or cargo munition. Like cluster bombs, an artillery shell may be used to scatter smaller sub-munitions, including anti-personnel grenades, anti-tank top-attack munitions, and landmines. These are generally far more lethal against both armour and infantry than simple high-explosive shells, since the multiple munitions create a larger kill zone and increase the chance of achieving the direct hit necessary to kill armour. Many modern armies make significant use of cluster munitions in their artillery batteries.

Artillery-scattered mines allow for the quick deployment of minefields into the path of the enemy without placing engineering units at risk, but artillery delivery may lead to an irregular and unpredictable minefield with more unexploded ordnance than if mines were individually placed.

Signatories of the Convention on Cluster Munitions have accepted restrictions on the use of cluster munitions, including artillery shells: the treaty requires that a weapon so defined must contain nine or fewer submunitions, which must each weigh more than 4 kilograms, be capable of detecting and engaging a single target, and contain electronic self-destruct and self-deactivation systems. Submunitions which weigh 20 kg or more are not restricted.

=== Chemical ===
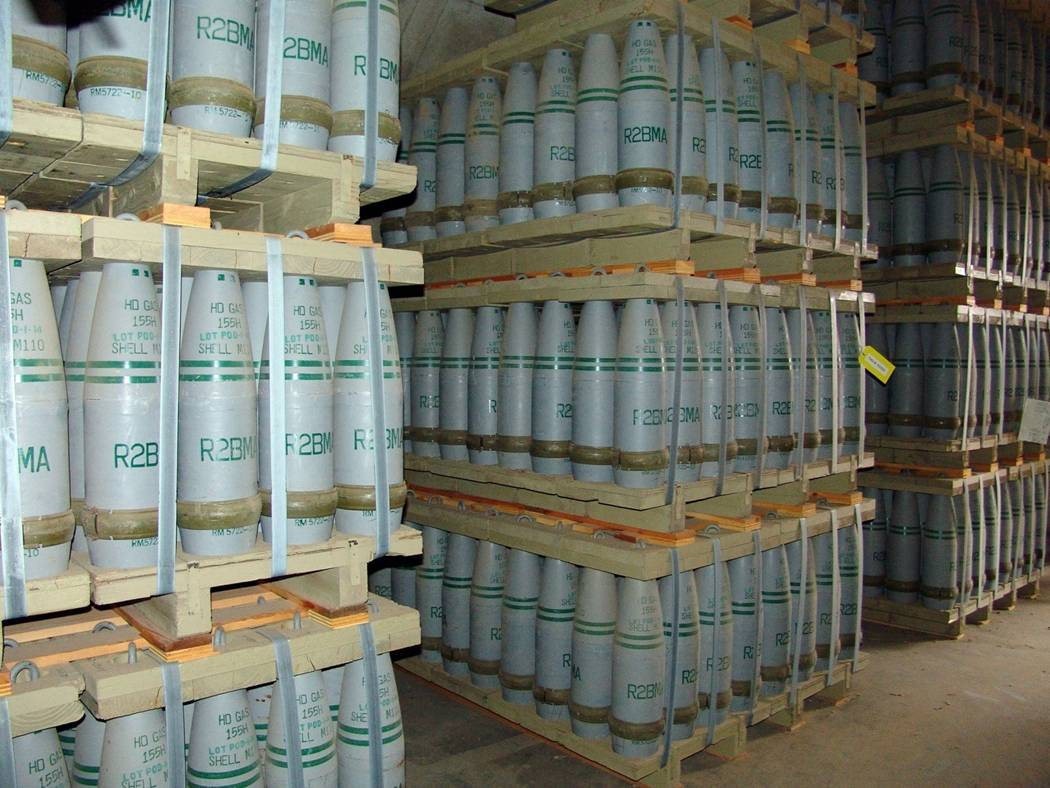
155 mm artillery shells containing HD (sulfur mustard) agent at Pueblo chemical weapons storage facility – Note the colour-coding scheme on each shell.

Chemical shells contain just a small explosive charge to burst the shell, and a larger quantity of a chemical agent or riot control agent of some kind, in either liquid, gas or powdered form. In some cases such as the M687 Sarin gas shell, the payload is stored as two precursor chemicals which are mixed after the shell is fired. Some examples designed to deliver powdered chemical agents, such as the M110 155mm Cartridge, were later repurposed as smoke/incendiary rounds containing powdered white phosphorus.

Chemical shells were most commonly employed during the First World War. Use of chemical agents of all kinds has been forbidden by numerous international treaties starting with the 1925 Geneva Protocol (not to be confused with the Geneva Convention), with the 1993 Chemical Weapons Convention being the most modern treaty which also outlaws production, stockpiling and transfer of such weapons. All signatories have renounced the use of both lethal chemical agents and incapacitating agents in warfare.

=== Nuclear artillery ===
Nuclear artillery shells are used to provide battlefield scale nuclear weapons for tactical use. These range from the relatively small 155 mm shell to the 406 mm shell used by heavy battleship cannon and shore defense units equipped with the same guns.

=== Non-lethal shells ===
Not all shells are designed to kill or destroy. The following types are designed to achieve particular non-lethal effects. They are not completely harmless: smoke and illumination shells can accidentally start fires, and impact by the discarded carrier of all three types can wound or kill personnel, or cause minor damage to property.

==== Smoke ====
Smoke shells are used to create smoke screens to mask movements of friendly forces or disorient enemies, or to mark specific areas. The main types are bursting (using a payload powdered chemicals) and base ejection (delivering three or four smoke canisters which are deployed from the rear of the shell prior to impact, or a single canister containing submunitions distributed via a bursting charge). Base ejection shells are a type of carrier shell or cargo munition.

Base ejection smoke is usually white, however, colored smoke has been used for marking purposes. The original canisters typically used hexachloroethane-zinc (HC), modern ones use red phosphorus because of its multi-spectral properties. However, other compounds have been used; in World War II, Germany used oleum (fuming sulfuric acid) and pumice.

Due to the nature of their payload, powder smoke shells using white phosphorus in particular have a secondary effect as incendiary weapons, though they are not as effective in this role as dedicated weapons using thermite.

==== Illumination ====
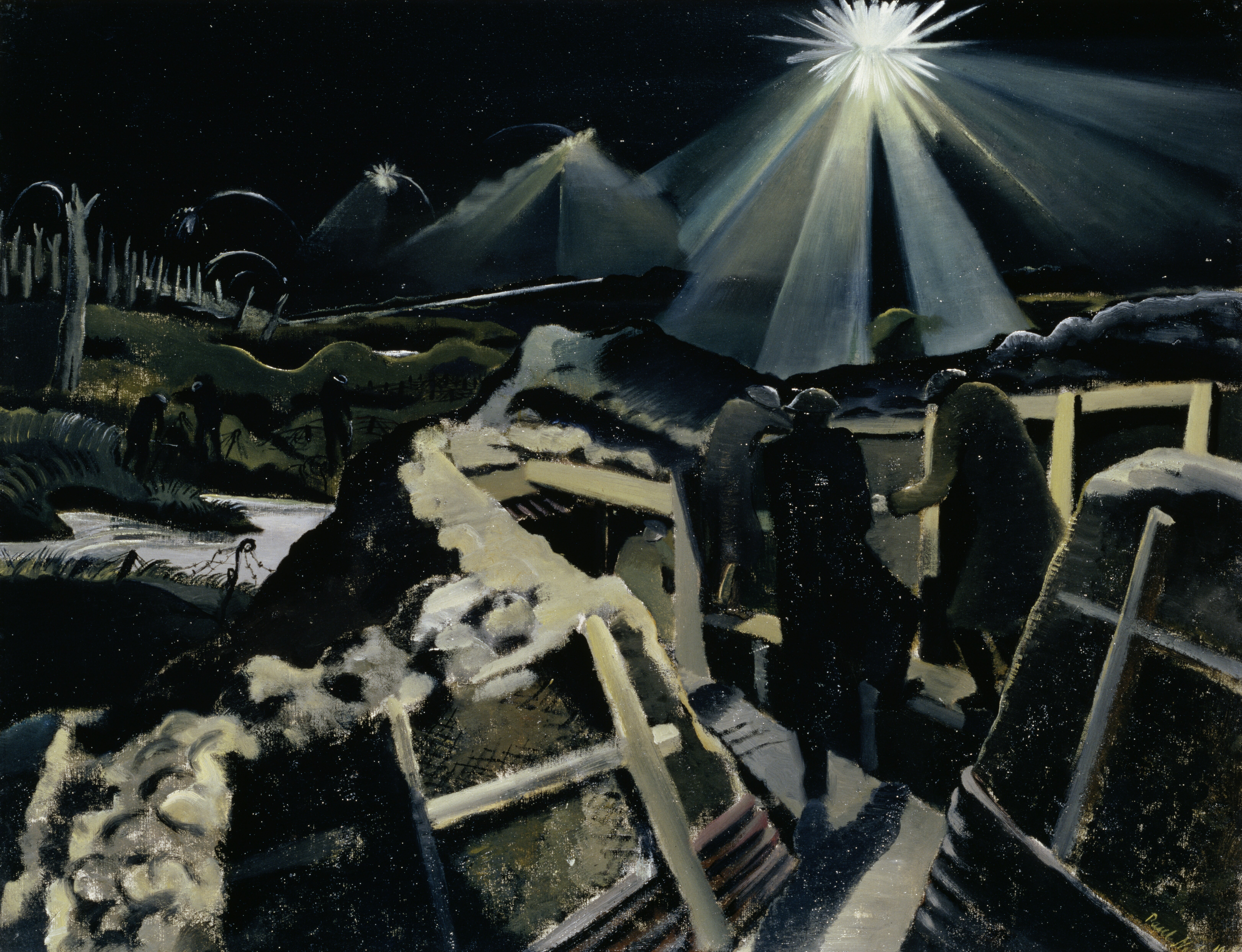
The Ypres Salient at Night, a 1918 painting depicting the use of star shells for battlefield illumination

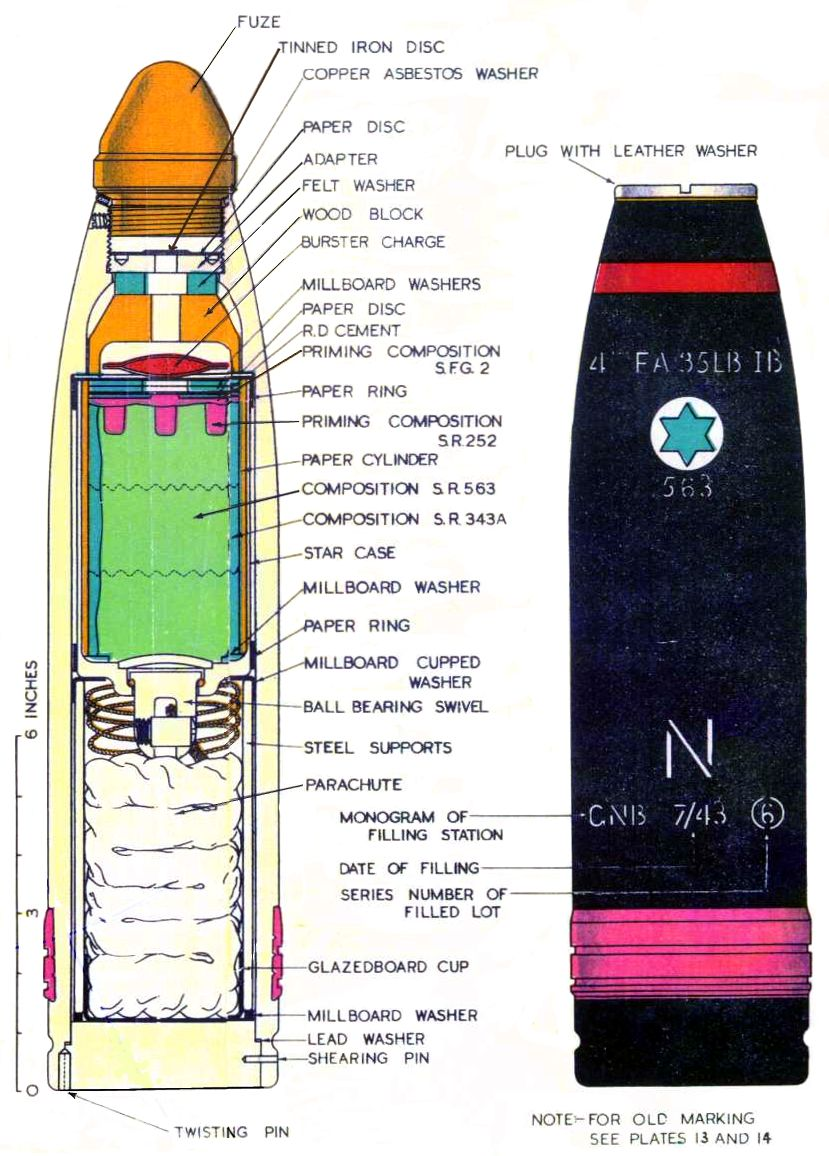
British World War II 4-inch naval illuminating shell, showing time fuze (orange, top), illuminating compound (green) and parachute (white, bottom)

Modern illuminating shells are a type of carrier shell or cargo munition. Those used in World War I were shrapnel pattern shells ejecting small burning "pots".

A modern illumination shell has a time fuze that ejects a flare "package" through the base of the carrier shell at a standard height above ground (typically about 600 metres), from where it slowly falls beneath a non-flammable parachute, illuminating the area below. The ejection process also initiates a pyrotechnic flare emitting white or "black" (infrared) light.

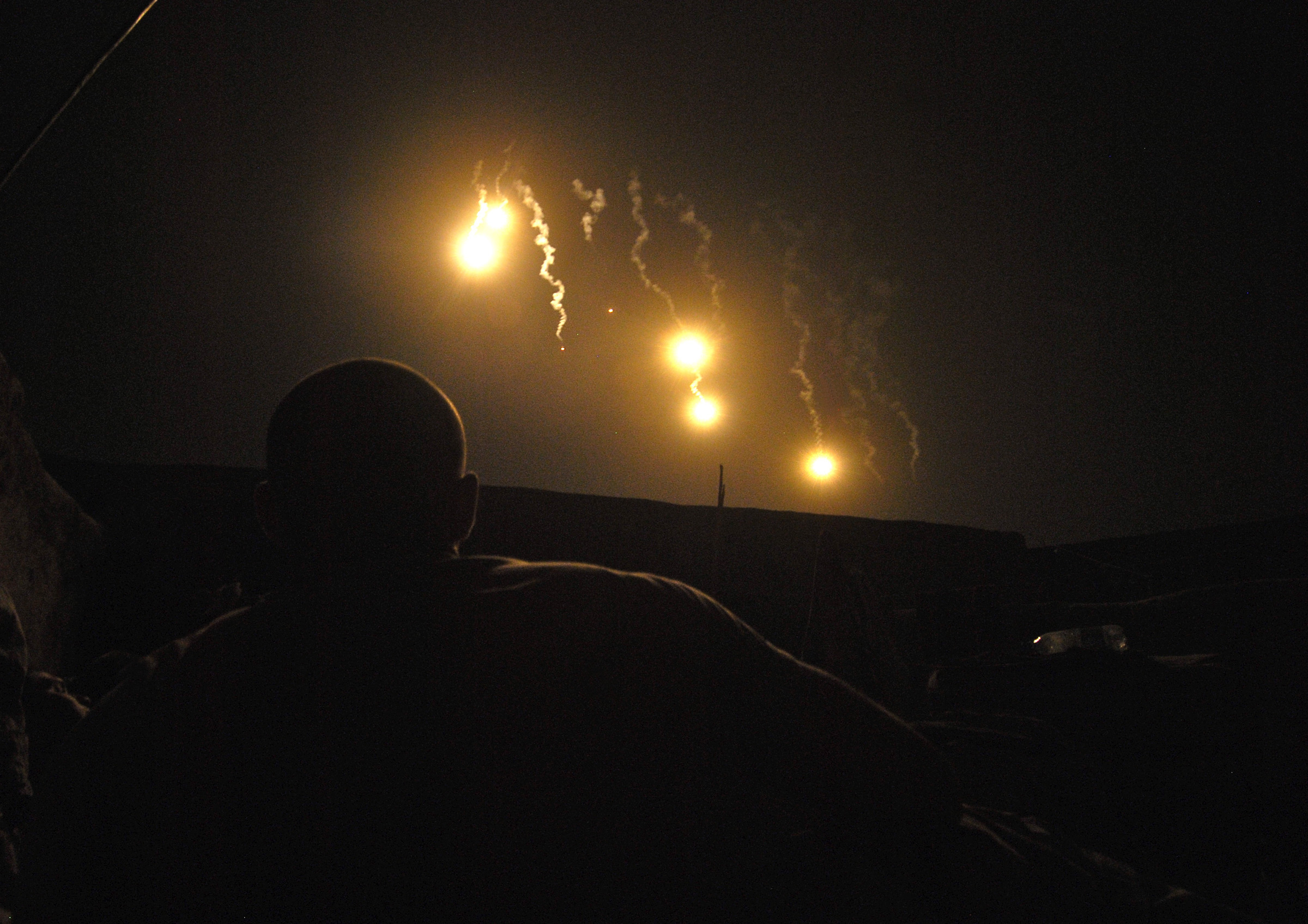
Illumination rounds fired from a M777 howitzer

Typically illumination flares burn for about 60 seconds. These are also known as star shells. Infrared illumination is a more recent development used to enhance the performance of night-vision devices. Both white- and black-light illuminating shells may be used to provide continuous illumination over an area for a period of time and may use several dispersed aimpoints to illuminate a large area. Alternatively, firing single illuminating shells may be coordinated with the adjustment of HE shell fire onto a target.

Colored flare shells have also been used for target marking and other signaling purposes.

==== Carrier ====
The carrier shell is simply a hollow carrier equipped with a fuze that ejects the contents at a calculated time. They are often filled with leaflets (see external links), but can be filled with anything that meets the weight restrictions and is able to withstand the shock of firing. Famously, on Christmas Day 1899 during the siege of Ladysmith, the Boers fired into Ladysmith a carrier shell without a fuze, which contained a Christmas pudding, two Union Flags and the message "compliments of the season". The shell is still kept in the museum at Ladysmith.

==== Proof shot ====
A proof shot is not used in combat but to confirm that a new gun barrel can withstand operational stresses. The proof shot is heavier than a normal shot or shell, and an oversize propelling charge is used, subjecting the barrel to greater than normal stress. The proof shot is inert (no explosive or functioning filling) and is often a solid unit, although water, sand or iron powder filled versions may be used for testing the gun mounting. Although the proof shot resembles a functioning shell (of whatever sort), so that it behaves as a real shell in the barrel, it is not aerodynamic as its job is over once it has left the muzzle of the gun. Consequently, it travels a much shorter distance and is usually stopped by an earth bank, for safety.

The gun, operated remotely for safety in case it fails, fires the proof shot, and is then inspected for damage. If the barrel passes the examination, "proof marks" are added to the barrel. The gun can be expected to handle normal ammunition, which subjects it to less stress than the proof shot, without being damaged.

=== Guided shells ===
Guided or "smart" ammunition features some method of guiding itself post-launch, usually through the addition of steering fins that alter its trajectory in an unpowered glide. Due to their much higher cost, they have yet to supplant unguided munitions in all applications.

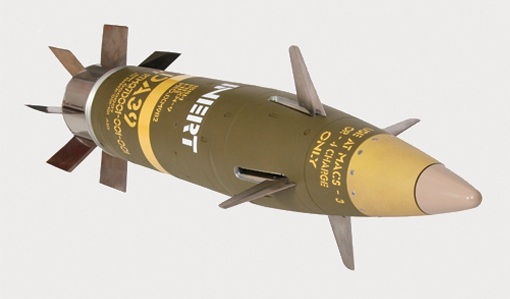
M982 Excalibur, a GPS guided artillery shell

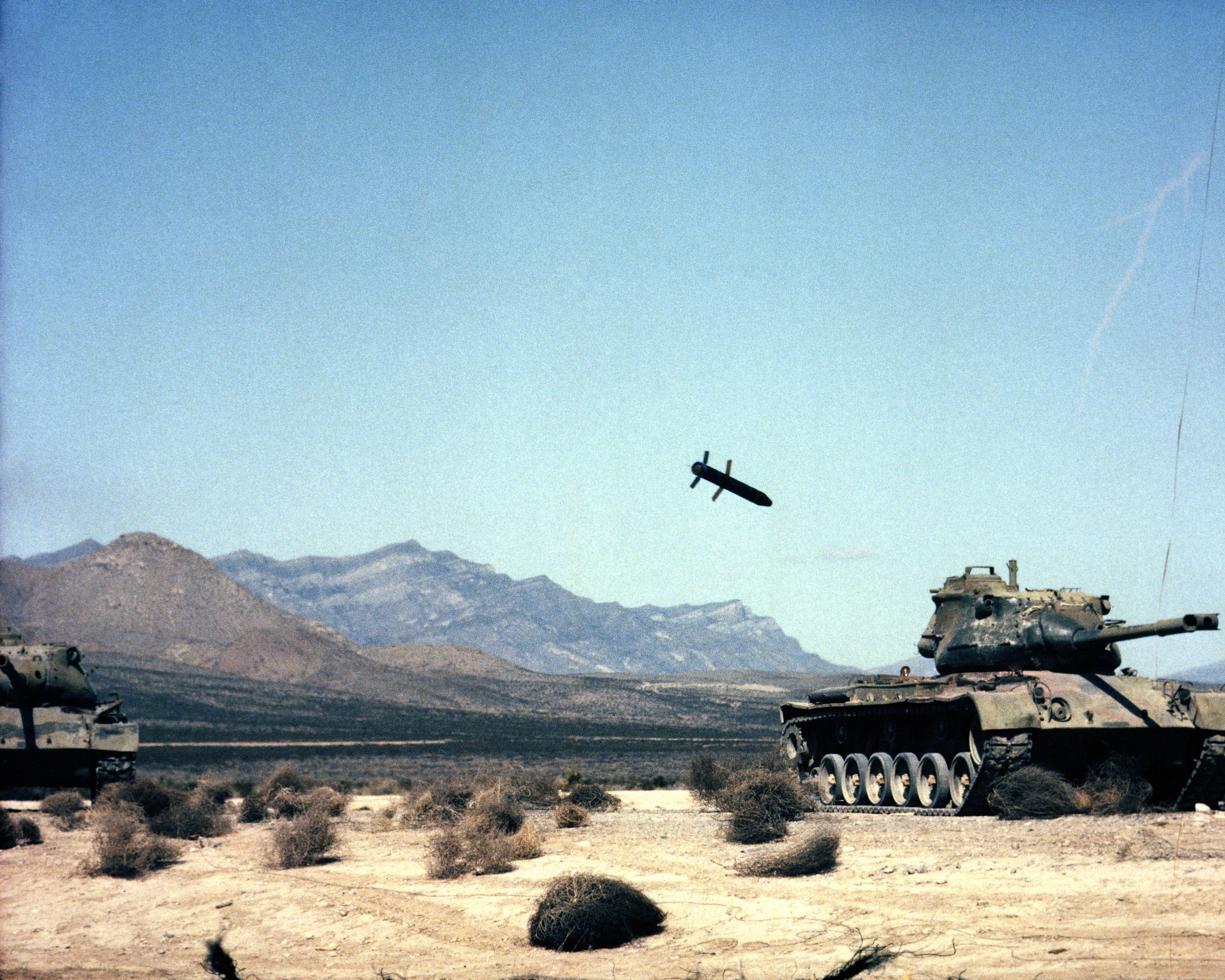
M712 Copperhead, a laser guided artillery shell, approaches a target tank

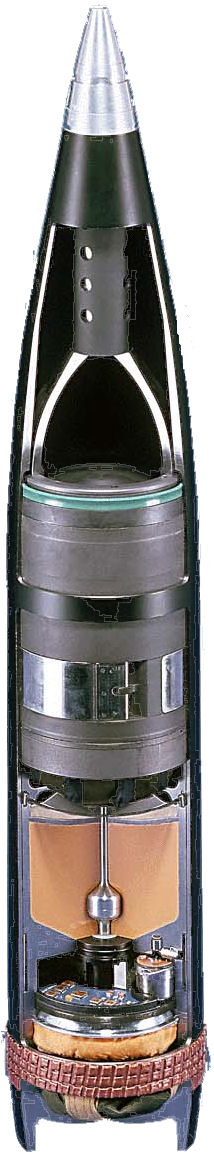
SMArt 155, an anti-armour shell containing two autonomous, sensor-guided, fire-and-forget submunitions

M1156 precision guidance kit, an add-on GPS guidance system for artillery shells

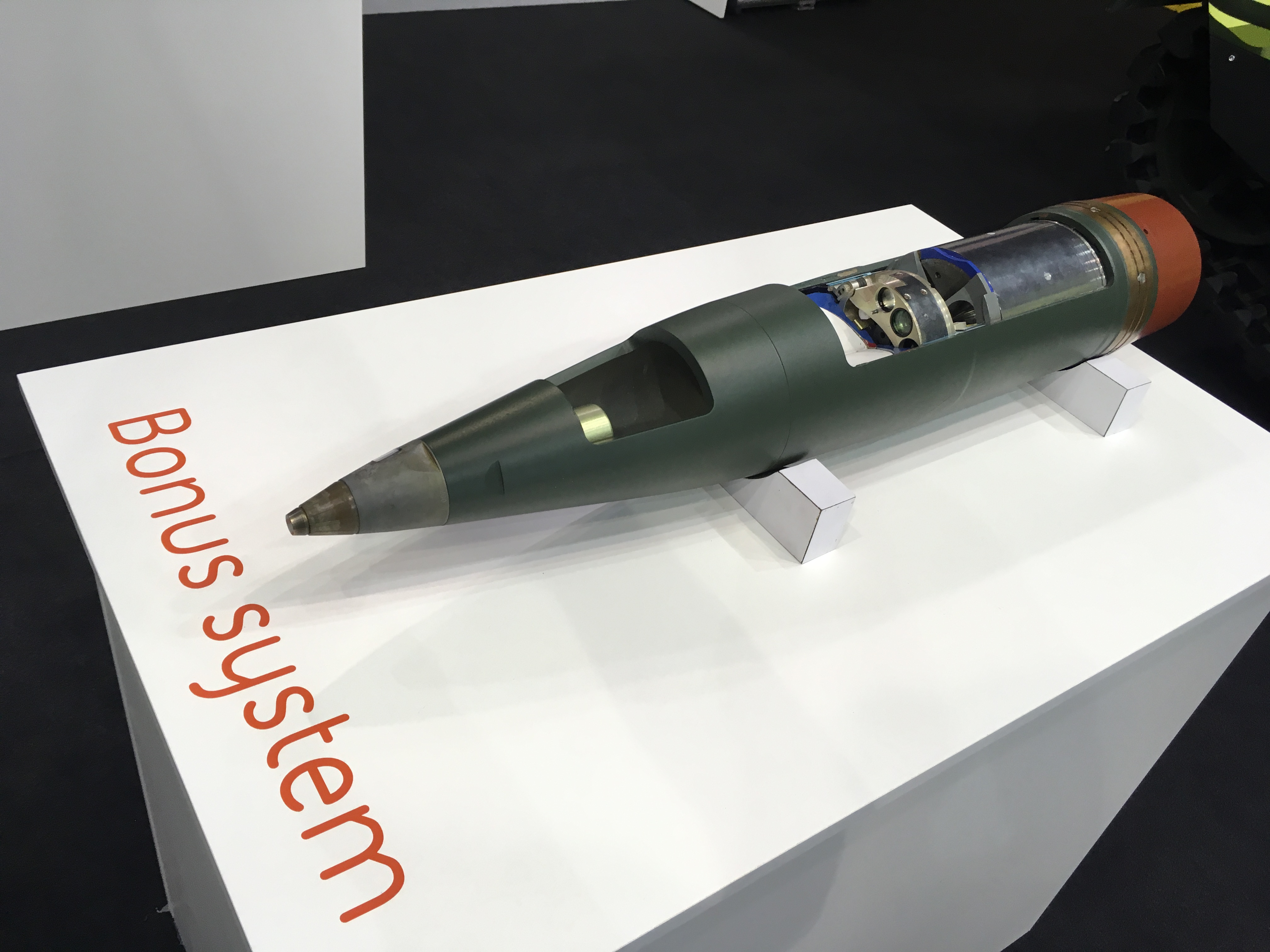
Bofors/Nexter Bonus, with infrared and LiDAR guided submunitions

== Unexploded shells ==
The fuze of a shell has to keep the shell safe from accidental functioning during storage, due to (possibly) rough handling, fire, etc. It also has to survive the violent launch through the barrel, then reliably function at the appropriate moment. To do this it has a number of arming mechanisms which are successively enabled under the influence of the firing sequence.

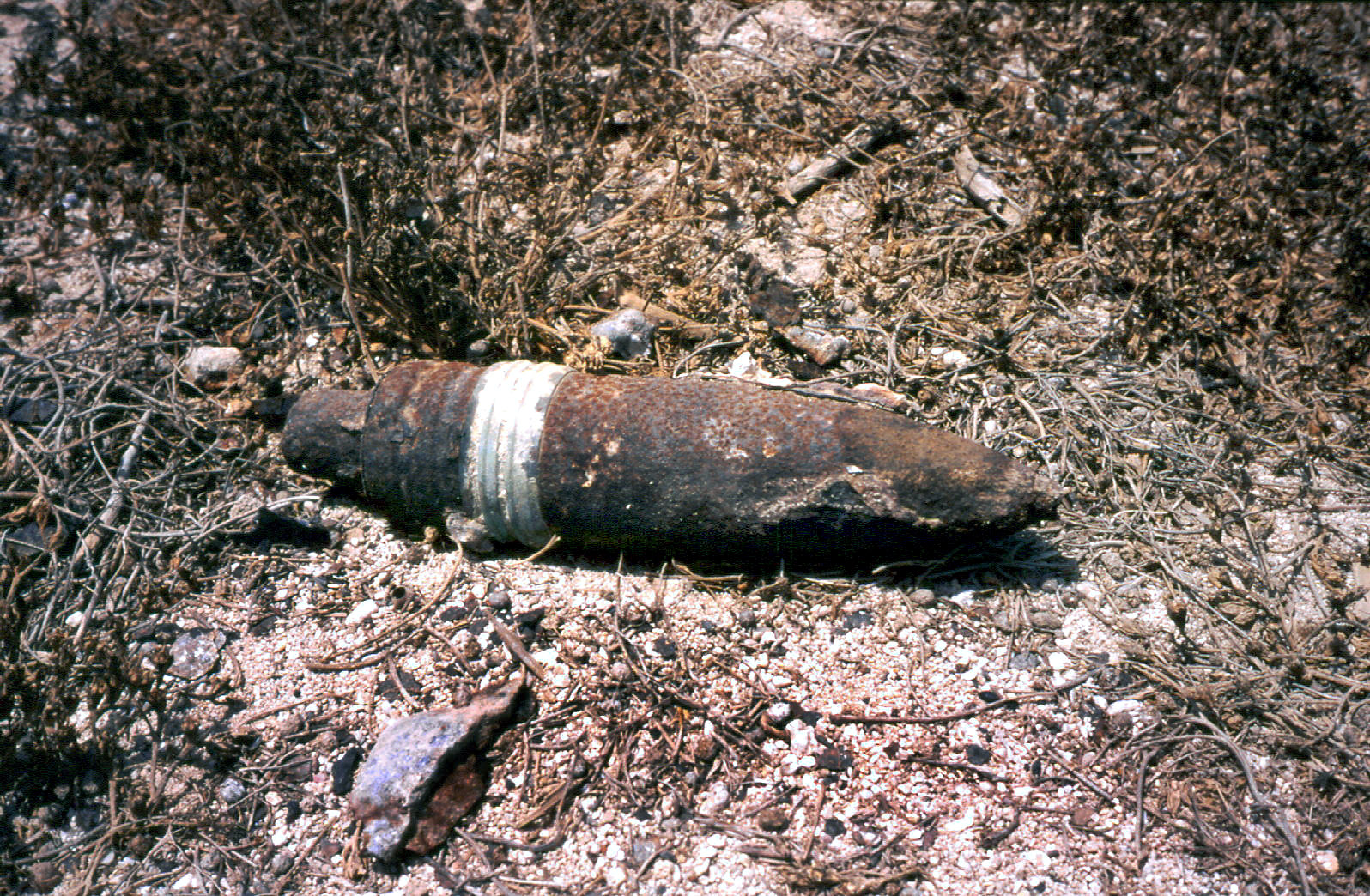
Corroded but live Iraqi artillery shell dating from the Gulf War (1990–1991)

Sometimes, one or more of these arming mechanisms fail, resulting in a projectile that is unable to detonate. More worrying (and potentially far more hazardous) are fully armed shells on which the fuze fails to initiate the HE firing. This may be due to a shallow trajectory of fire, low-velocity firing or soft impact conditions. Whatever the reason for failure, such a shell is called a blind or unexploded ordnance (UXO) (the older term, "dud", is discouraged because it implies that the shell cannot detonate.) Blind shells often litter old battlefields; depending on the impact velocity, they may be buried some distance into the earth, all the while remaining potentially hazardous. For example, antitank ammunition with a piezoelectric fuze can be detonated by relatively light impact to the piezoelectric element, and others, depending on the type of fuze used, can be detonated by even a small movement. The battlefields of the First World War still claim casualties today from leftover munitions. Modern electrical and mechanical fuzes are highly reliable: if they do not arm correctly, they keep the initiation train out of line or (if electrical in nature) discharge any stored electrical energy.
