= CH4N2O =

The molecular formula CH_{4}N_{2}O (molar mass: 60.06 g/mol, exact mass: 60.03236 u) may refer to:

- Urea, or carbamide
- Ammonium cyanate
- Formylhydrazine
