= Inorganic compound =

Chemical compound without any carbon-hydrogen bonds

An inorganic compound is typically a chemical compound that lacks carbon–hydrogen bonds—that is, a compound that is not an organic compound. The study of inorganic compounds is a subfield of chemistry known as inorganic chemistry.

Inorganic compounds comprise most of the Earth's crust, although the compositions of the deep mantle remain active areas of investigation.

All allotropes of carbon and some simple carbon compounds are often considered inorganic. Examples include the allotropes of carbon (graphite, diamond, buckminsterfullerene, graphene, etc.), carbon monoxide CO, carbon dioxide CO_{2}, carbides, and salts of inorganic anions such as carbonates, cyanides, cyanates, thiocyanates, isothiocyanates, etc. Many of these are normal parts of mostly organic systems, including organisms; describing a chemical as inorganic does not necessarily mean that it cannot occur within living things.

== History ==
Friedrich Wöhler's conversion of ammonium cyanate into urea in 1828 is often cited as the starting point of modern organic chemistry. In Wöhler's era, there was widespread belief that organic compounds were characterized by a vital spirit. In the absence of vitalism, the distinction between inorganic and organic chemistry is merely semantic.

=== Modern usage ===
- The Inorganic Crystal Structure Database (ICSD) in its definition of "inorganic" carbon compounds, states that such compounds may contain either C-H or C-C bonds, but not both.
- The book series Inorganic Syntheses does not define inorganic compounds. The majority of its content deals with metal complexes of organic ligands.
- IUPAC does not offer a definition of "inorganic" or "inorganic compound" but does define inorganic polymer as "...skeletal structure that does not include carbon atoms."

== See also ==
- Inorganic compounds by element
- List of inorganic compounds
- List of named inorganic compounds
- Mineral acid
