= Bosch–Meiser process =

Industrial urea manufacturing process

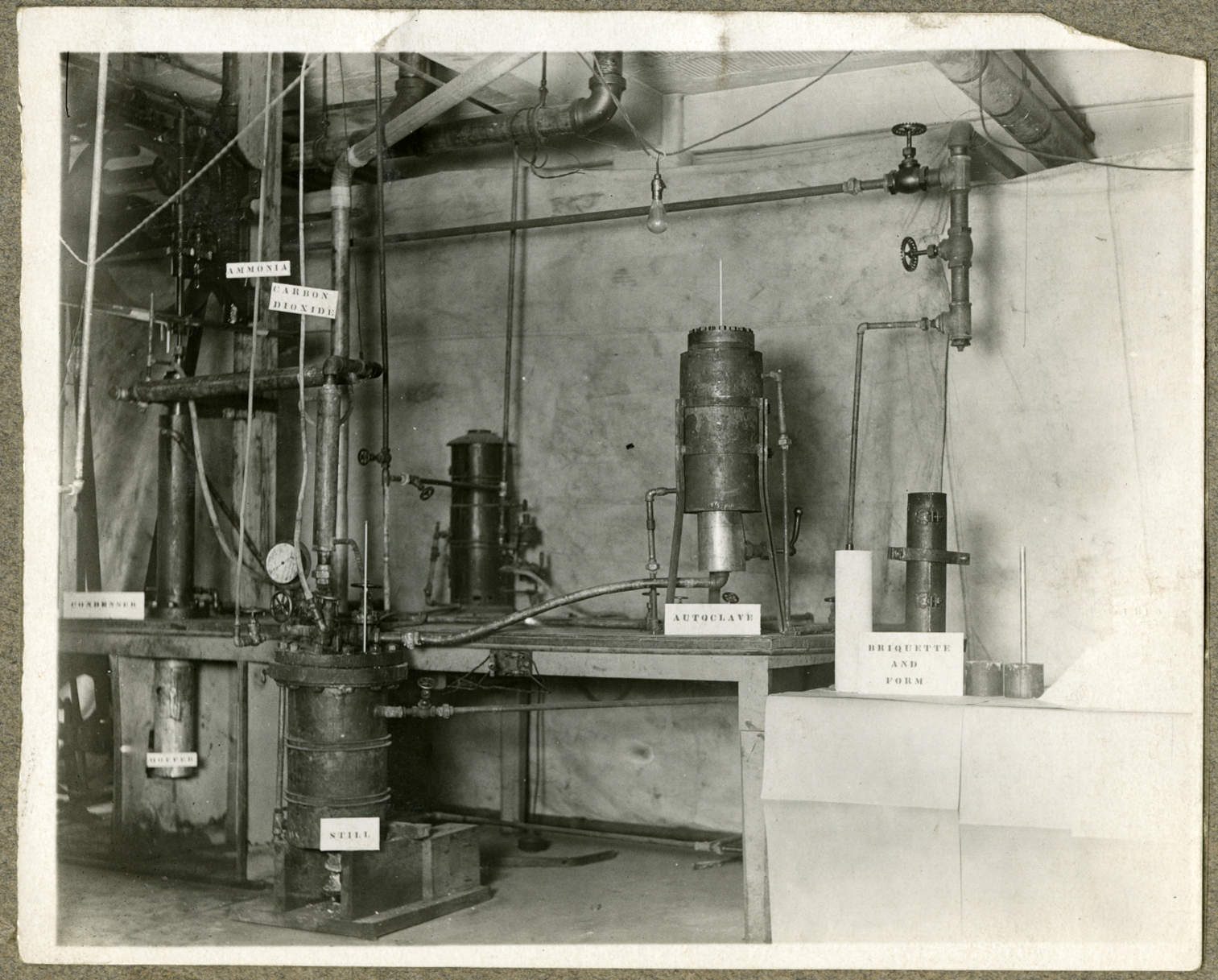
Urea plant using ammonium carbamate briquettes, Fixed Nitrogen Research Laboratory, ca. 1930

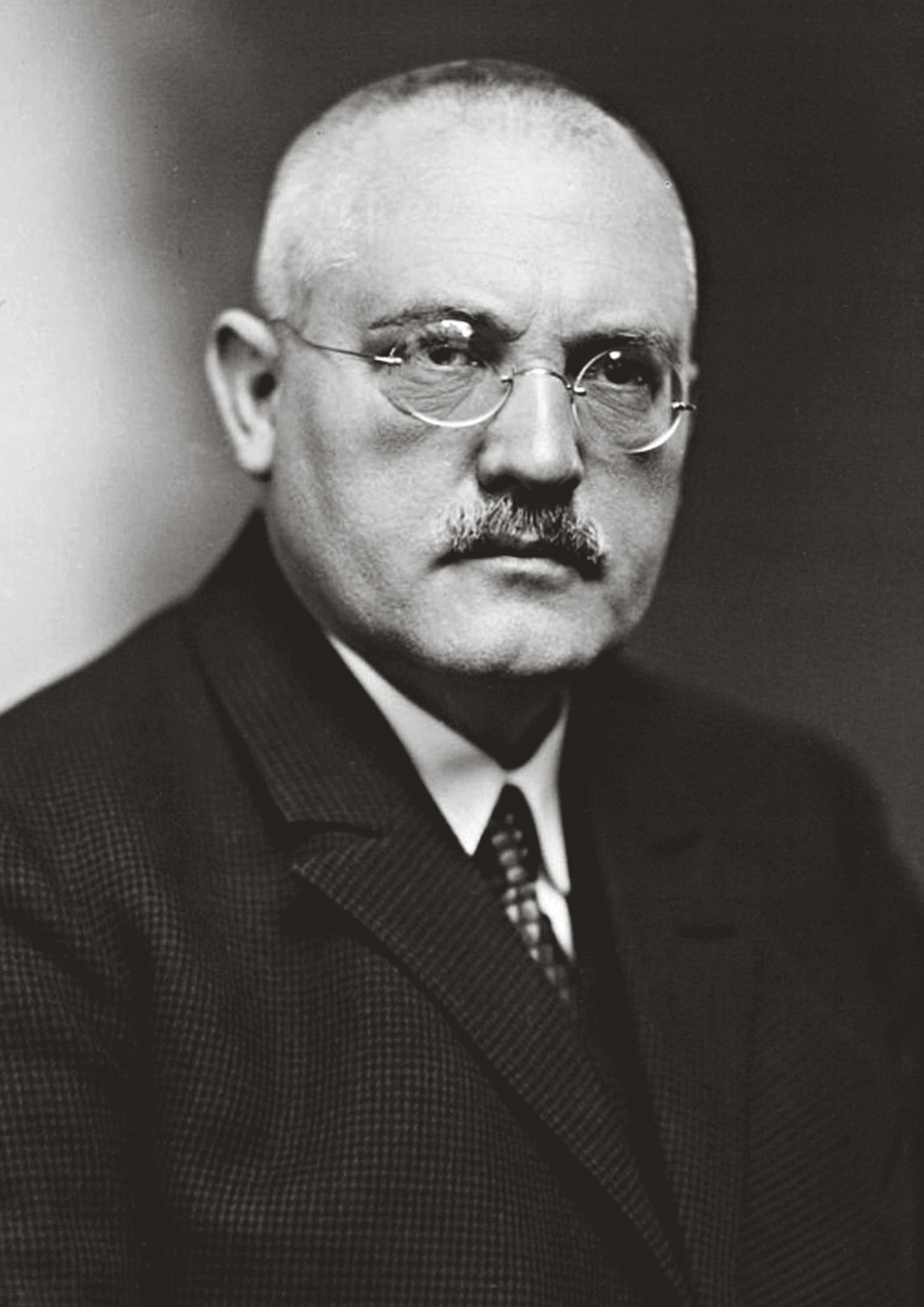
Carl Bosch, 1927

The Bosch–Meiser process is an industrial process for the large-scale manufacturing of urea, a valuable nitrogenous chemical. It was patented in 1922 and named after its discoverers, the German chemists Carl Bosch and Wilhelm Meiser.

The whole process consists of two main equilibrium reactions, with incomplete conversion of the reactants.

- The first, called carbamate formation: the fast exothermic reaction of liquid ammonia with gaseous carbon dioxide (CO_{2}) at high temperature and pressure to form ammonium carbamate ([NH_{4}]^{+}[NH_{2}COO]^{−}):

2 NH_{3} + CO_{2} ⇌ [NH_{4}]^{+}[NH_{2}COO]^{−} (ΔH = −117 kJ/mol at 110 standard atmospheres [11,000 kPa] and 160 °C [320 °F])

- The second, called urea conversion: the slower endothermic decomposition of ammonium carbamate into urea and water:

[NH_{4}]^{+}[NH_{2}COO]^{−} ⇌ CO(NH_{2})_{2} + H_{2}O (ΔH = +15.5 kJ/mol at 160–180 °C [320–356 °F])

The overall conversion of NH_{3} and CO_{2} to urea is exothermic, with the reaction heat from the first reaction driving the second. The conditions that favor urea formation (high temperature) have an unfavorable effect on the carbamate formation equilibrium. The process conditions are a compromise: the ill-effect on the first reaction of the high temperature (around 190 °C [374 °F]) needed for the second is compensated for by conducting the process under high pressure (140–175 bars [14,000–17,500 kPa]), which favors the first reaction. Although it is necessary to compress gaseous carbon dioxide to this pressure, the ammonia is available from the ammonia production plant in liquid form, which can be pumped into the system much more economically. To allow the slow urea formation reaction time to reach equilibrium, a large reaction space is needed, so the synthesis reactor in a large urea plant tends to be a massive pressure vessel.

== Reactant recycling ==
Because the urea conversion is incomplete, the urea must be separated from the unconverted reactants, including the ammonium carbamate. Various commercial urea processes are characterized by the conditions under which urea forms and the way that unconverted reactants are further processed.

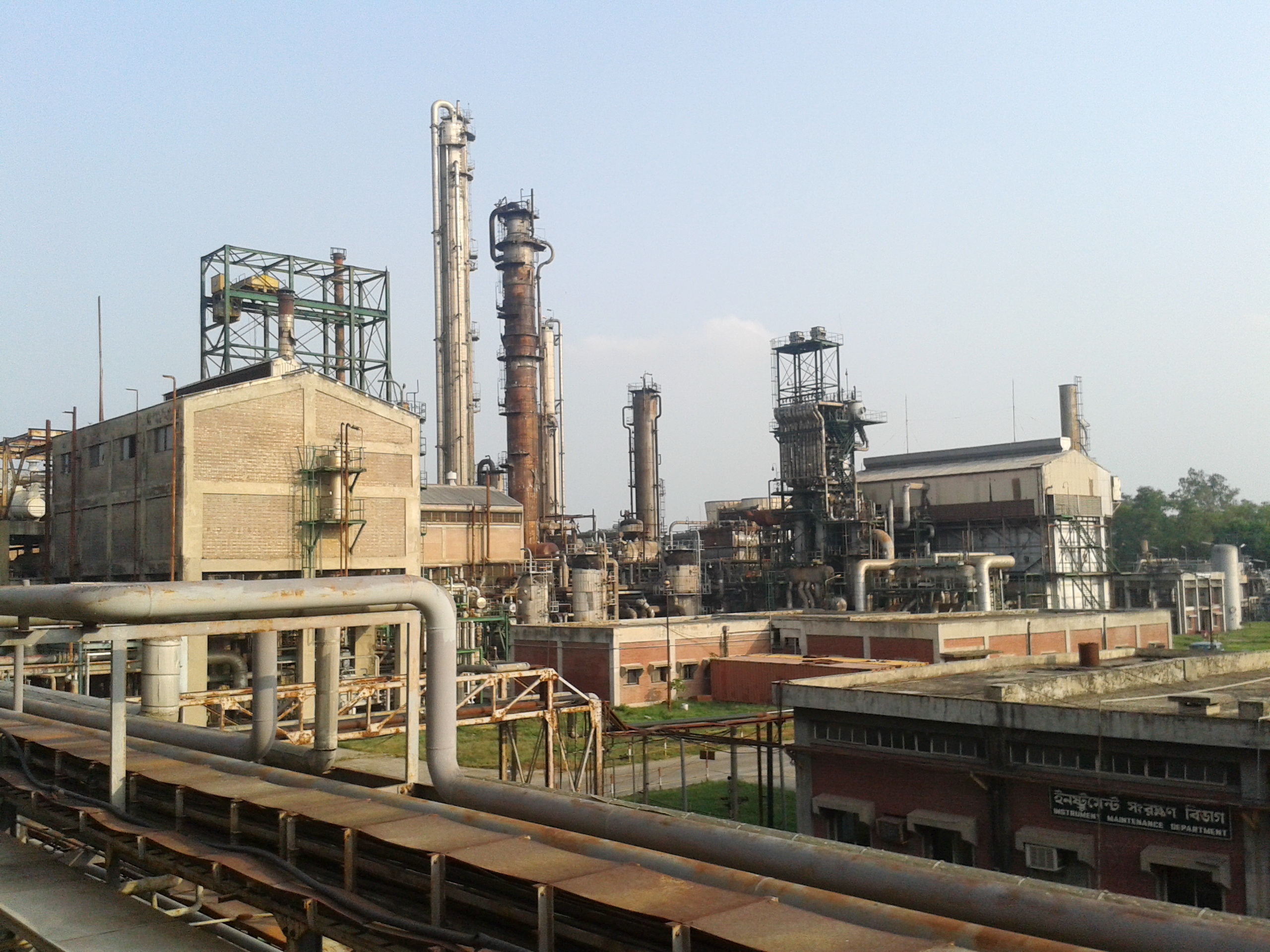
The industrial plant UFFL in Bangladesh that produces urea.

=== Conventional recycle processes ===
In early "straight-through" urea plants, reactant recovery (the first step in "recycling") was done by letting down the system pressure to atmospheric to let the carbamate decompose back to ammonia and carbon dioxide. Originally, because it was not economic to recompress the ammonia and carbon dioxide for recycle, the ammonia at least would be used for the manufacture of other products such as ammonium nitrate or ammonium sulfate, and the carbon dioxide was usually wasted. Later process schemes made recycling unused ammonia and carbon dioxide practical. This was accomplished by the "total recycle process", developed in the 1940s to 1960s and now called the "conventional recycle process". It proceeds by depressurizing the reaction solution in stages (first to 18–25 bars [1,800–2,500 kPa] and then to 2–5 bars [200–500 kPa]) and passing it at each stage through a steam-heated carbamate decomposer, then recombining the resulting carbon dioxide and ammonia in a falling-film carbamate condenser and pumping the carbamate solution back into the urea reaction vessel.

=== Stripping recycle process ===
The "conventional recycle process" for recovering and reusing the reactants has largely been supplanted by a stripping process, developed in the early 1960s by Stamicarbon in The Netherlands, that operates at or near the full pressure of the reaction vessel. It reduces the complexity of the multi-stage recycle scheme, and it reduces the amount of water recycled in the carbamate solution, which has an adverse effect on the equilibrium in the urea conversion reaction and thus on overall plant efficiency. Effectively all new urea plants use the stripper, and many total recycle urea plants have converted to a stripping process.

In the conventional recycle processes, carbamate decomposition is promoted by reducing the overall pressure, which reduces the partial pressure of both ammonia and carbon dioxide, allowing these gasses to be separated from the urea product solution. The stripping process achieves a similar effect without lowering the overall pressure, by suppressing the partial pressure of just one of the reactants in order to promote carbamate decomposition. Instead of feeding carbon dioxide gas directly to the urea synthesis reactor with the ammonia, as in the conventional process, the stripping process first routes the carbon dioxide through the stripper. The stripper is a carbamate decomposer that provides a large amount of gas-liquid contact. This flushes out free ammonia, reducing its partial pressure over the liquid surface and carrying it directly to a carbamate condenser (also under full system pressure). From there, reconstituted ammonium carbamate liquor is passed to the urea production reactor. That eliminates the medium-pressure stage of the conventional recycle process.

== Side reactions ==
The three main side reactions that produce impurities have in common that they decompose urea.

Urea hydrolyzes back to ammonium carbamate in the hottest stages of the synthesis plant, especially in the stripper, so residence times in these stages are designed to be short.

Biuret is formed when two molecules of urea combine with the loss of a molecule of ammonia.

2 NH_{2}CONH_{2} → NH_{2}CONHCONH_{2} + NH_{3}

Normally this reaction is suppressed in the synthesis reactor by maintaining an excess of ammonia, but after the stripper, it occurs until the temperature is reduced. Biuret is undesirable in urea fertilizer because it is toxic to crop plants to varying degrees, but it is sometimes desirable as a nitrogen source when used in animal feed.

Isocyanic acid HNCO and ammonia NH_{3} results from the thermal decomposition of ammonium cyanate [NH_{4}]^{+}[OCN]^{−}, which is in chemical equilibrium with urea:

CO(NH_{2})_{2} → [NH_{4}]^{+}[OCN]^{−} → HNCO + NH_{3}

This decomposition is at its worst when the urea solution is heated at low pressure, which happens when the solution is concentrated for prilling or granulation (see below). The reaction products mostly volatilize into the overhead vapours, and recombine when these condense to form urea again, which contaminates the process condensate.

== Corrosion ==
Ammonium carbamate solutions are highly corrosive to metallic construction materials – even to resistant forms of stainless steel – especially in the hottest parts of the synthesis plant such as the stripper. Historically corrosion has been minimized (although not eliminated) by continuous injection of a small amount of oxygen (as air) into the plant to establish and maintain a passive oxide layer on exposed stainless steel surfaces. Highly corrosion resistant materials have been introduced to reduce the need for passivation oxygen, such as specialized duplex stainless steels in the 1990s, and zirconium or zirconium-clad titanium tubing in the 2000s.

== Global production ==
In 2022, the world production of urea was estimated approximately at 210 million tonnes (210×10^{6} long tons; 230×10^{6} short tons).
