= Nitrourea =

- Nitrourea

Names
- Preferred IUPAC name Nitrourea
- Other names N-Nitrocarbamide

Identifiers
CAS Number	556-89-8
3D model (JSmol)	Interactive image; Interactive image
ChemSpider	56160
ECHA InfoCard	100.008.314
PubChem CID	62372
UNII	3UA35787YZ
CompTox Dashboard (EPA)	DTXSID4060311
- InChI: InChI=1S/CH3N3O3/c2-1(5)3-4(6)7/h(H3,2,3,5) Key: CMUOJBJRZUHRMU-DTXNPOPMCO
- SMILES: C(=O)(N)N[N+](=O)[O-]; NC(=O)N[N+]([O-])=O

Properties
Chemical formula	CH_{3}N_{3}O_{3}
Molar mass	105.053 g·mol^{−1}
Appearance	White crystalline solid
Density	1.73 g/cm^{3}
Melting point	158.4–158.8 °C (317.1–317.8 °F; 431.5–431.9 K) (decomposes)
Solubility in water	2±0.2 g/100 mL
Solubility	Slightly soluble in benzene and chloroform
Solubility in acetone	4.1±0.5 g/100mL
Solubility in ethanol	1.72±0.06 g/100mL
Solubility in methanol	4.3±0.8 g/100mL

Thermochemistry
Std enthalpy of formation (Δ_{f}H^{⦵}_{298})	−639.7 kcal/kg
Std enthalpy of combustion (Δ_{c}H^{⦵}_{298})	133.56 cal/mol

Explosive data
Shock sensitivity	Low (incomplete explosion at 460 mm (18 in) / 2 kg (4.4 lb) weight)
Detonation velocity	6860
RE factor	0.94 (Trauzl test, picric acid)

Related compounds
Related compounds	Urea nitrate
- Except where otherwise noted, data are given for materials in their standard state (at 25 °C [77 °F], 100 kPa). Infobox references

Nitrourea is a strong high explosive compound synthesized by the nitration of urea or by way of a dehydration reaction of urea nitrate with sulfuric acid at 0 °C (32 °F).
