= Alkanal monooxygenase (FMN-linked) =

alkanal monooxygenase (FMN-linked)

Identifiers
- EC no.: 1.14.14.3
- CAS no.: 9014-00-0

Databases
- IntEnz: IntEnz view
- BRENDA: BRENDA entry
- ExPASy: NiceZyme view
- KEGG: KEGG entry
- MetaCyc: metabolic pathway
- PRIAM: profile
- PDB structures: RCSB PDB PDBe PDBsum
- Gene Ontology: AmiGO / QuickGO
Search
- PMC: articles
- PubMed: articles
- NCBI: proteins

In enzymology, an alkanal monooxygenase (FMN-linked) (EC 1.14.14.3) is an enzyme that catalyzes the chemical reaction

RCHO + reduced FMN + O_{2} $\rightleftharpoons$ RCOOH + FMN + H_{2}O + hnu

The 3 substrates of this enzyme are RCHO, reduced FMN, and O_{2}, whereas its 4 products are RCOOH, FMN, H_{2}O, and hn.

This enzyme belongs to the family of oxidoreductases, specifically those acting on paired donors, with O2 as oxidant and incorporation or reduction of oxygen. The oxygen incorporated need not be derived from O2 with reduced flavin or flavoprotein as one donor, and incorporation of one atom of oxygen into the other donor. The systematic name of this enzyme class is alkanal, reduced-FMN:oxygen oxidoreductase (1-hydroxylating, luminescing). Other names in common use include bacterial luciferase, aldehyde monooxygenase, luciferase, and Vibrio fischeri luciferase.

== Structural studies ==
As of late 2007, 4 structures have been solved for this class of enzymes, with PDB accession codes 1BRL, 1BSL, 1LUC, and 1XKJ.
