= Maire Tecnimont =

Company in Milan, Italy

MAIRE

- Type: Società per azioni
- Traded as: BIT: MT; FTSE Italia Mid Cap
- Industry: Engineering and contracting
- Headquarters: Rome: Milan, Italy
- Key people: Fabrizio Di Amato, Chairman; Alessandro Bernini, CEO
- Revenue: €7.1 billion (2025)
- Net income: €284.5 million (2025)
- Owners: GLV Capital – 51.02%; Yousif Mohamed Ali Nasser Al Nowais – 4,00%; Other retail and institutional investors – 44.98%
- Number of employees: 10,775 (2025)
- Subsidiaries: Tecnimont; Nextchem; KT – Kinetics Technology; Stamicarbon; Met Development; MST; My Replast Industries; MyRechemical
- Website: groupmaire.com/en/

MAIRE (Maire Tecnimont S.p.A.) is an Italian engineering and contracting company. Formed in 2005 from the merger of Fiat Engineering and Tecnimont, it is publicly traded on the Milan Stock Exchange. Headquartered in Milan, the company provides engineering, procurement, and construction (EPC) services and technology solutions for the energy, chemicals, and industrial sectors. It operates globally through subsidiaries including Tecnimont, NextChem, and Stamicarbon.

== History ==
=== Origins ===
Maire Tecnimont has its origins dating back to the 1930s with the founding of "Servizio Costruzioni e Impianti Fiat S.A.". It was set up as a division of the Fiat Group to design and construct equipment for car manufacturing. It was involved in the production of cogeneration and combined cycle plants both in Italy and abroad, also focusing on the Middle East and Latin America. Servizio Costruzioni e Impianti Fiat S.A. was spun off from Fiat in 1972 under the name Fiat Engineering S.p.A.

In 1966, Montecatini and Edison merged to form Montedison. In 1973, Montedison its consolidated engineering and development into a new subsidiary called Tecnimont S.p.A." In 2004 Maire Holding acquired Fiat Engineering and in 2005 acquired Tecnimont, forming Maire Tecnimont. In 2007, Maire Tecnimont went public on the Milan Stock Exchange.

=== 2008 to present ===
In 2008 Maire Tecnimont finalised the acquisition of the entire share capital of it:Tecnimont ICB Pvt. Ltd. Also in 2008, the Group acquired Noy Engineering which expanded its technological portfolio.

In 2009 Maire Tecnimont's acquisition of Stamicarbon allowed it to combine its traditional EPC activities with technology licensing services. Also in 2009, it entered the renewable energy industry with the creation of Met NewEn. The new company operates in the biomass and concentrated solar power sector.

On 2 August 2010, the company signed a lease contract for two Garibaldi Towers in Milan. The same year, it acquired Technip KTI SpA (TKTI) through the acquisition of a parent company: Sofipart Srl. In the first half of 2011, Maire Tecnimont created a new company named Tecnimont Civil Construction (TCC). The objective is to synergistically boost the Maire Tecnimont's expertise in the infrastructure and civil engineering sectors.

Starting in 2014–15, Tecnimont was part of a consortium along with Odebrecht and Estrella to develop the Punta Catalina coal-fired power plant in the Dominican Republic. Tecnimont was responsible for engineering and construction works, with the initial contract value estimated at US$1.9 billion. Following disputes over cost increases, the contractor consortium demanded additional funding to complete the project which was agreed to by the Dominican government. After the settlement, the plant was completed and commissioned.

In 2015, Maire Tecnimont, through its subsidiary Tecnimont and KT-Kinetics Technology, served served as an EPC contractor for key processing units of the SOCAR Polymer petrochemical complex located in the Sumgayit Chemical Industrial Park in Azerbaijan.

In 2016 Maire Tecnimont launched a new phase to bring about the digital transformation of its production processes and to open up to new business areas, such as renewable energy and green chemistry.

In November, 2018 Maire Tecnimont set up Nextchem, a new company to oversee green chemistry projects and projects focusing on energy transition. Among these, the construction of plants for the mechanical recycling of plastic, such as the one in Bedizzole (Brescia). In July 2019, it's division Stamicarbon acquired the Dutch IT company Protomation to continue its process of business digitalisation.

In 2020, Tecnimont (part of the MAIRE group) and its Russian affiliate MT Russia entered into contracts with the Russian company EuroChem North-West-2, a subsidiary of the EuroChem Group, for the engineering and construction of a gas-chemical complex in Kingisepp, Leningrad Region, with a total value of approximately €1 billion. In 2022, Tecnimont suspended works, citing restrictions related to European Union sanctions, while EuroChem subsequently terminated the contract, alleging non-fulfilment of contractual obligations. The dispute escalated into arbitration proceedings, followed by related litigation in multiple jurisdictions.

In December 2021, Maire Tecnimont subsidiary Tecnimont was awarded three of the five main EPC packages for the expansion project of the Borouge petrochemical complex located in the Ruwais industrial area, Abu Dhabi, United Arab Emirates. The packages awarded to Tecnimont include the construction of two new polyethylene units and a 1-hexene unit, utilities and offsites facilities, and a second cross-linkable polyethylene (XLPE) plant. The combined value of these three EPC packages is estimated at US$3.5 billion.

In June 2023, Saudi Aramco and TotalEnergies awarded EPC contracts for the main processing units of the SATORP complex in the Jubail industrial area in Saudi Arabia to several international contractors. Maire Tecnimont was awarded two EPC contracts with a combined value of approximately US$2 billion, making it one of the key contractors involved in the development of the complex.

== Activities ==
In 2019 the company's activity was 95% in Hydrocarbons and 3% in Green Energy.

The business activities are geographically located:

- 63% in Europe,
- 7% in the Middle East,
- 2% in North America,
- 18% Africa,
- 10% Asia.

== Group structure ==
- Hydrocarbon Processing
  - Tecnimont: engineering company and main contractor in chemicals, petrochemicals, oil and gas, energy, infrastructure and civil engineering, with a 50% market share in low-density polyethylene plants and 30% in polyolefin plants
  - KT – Kinetics Technology: process engineering contractor
  - Stamicarbon: services company acquired from DSM in October 2009, specializing in licensing and intellectual property, world market leader in urea technology with a 54% market share
  - Met Gas Processing Technologies
- Renewable & Green
  - Neosia Renewables: company specializing in the design and construction of renewable energy plants
  - Nextchem: company specialized in the green chemicals sector
- New Business Model
  - Met Development: corporate services

== Financial results ==
Financial year	Revenues (million €)	EBITDA (million €)	EBIT (million €)	Group profit (million €)
2025	7,096.5	500.1	431	284.5
2024	5,900.0	386.4	321.6	212.4
2023	4,259.5	274.4	216.5	129.5
2022	3,463.7	209.3	158	90.4
2021	2,864.8	173.3	130	80.5
2020	2,630.8	172.2	123.7	54.2
2019	3,338.4	235.6	185.7	113.0
2018	3,646.6	205.7	185.5	110.6
2017	3,524.3	193.5	183.5	118.7

== See also ==
- Fiat
- List of Italian companies
