= Wilhelm Meiser =

German chemist

Wilhelm Ottmar Meiser (19 March 1882 – 2 October 1943) was a German chemist known for his contributions to scientific research and academic teaching in the field of chemistry. He worked with German chemical engineer, Carl Bosch, and together developed in 1922 the so-called Bosch-Meiser process for the industrial production of urea, a key innovation, with scientific, agricultural and societal impact.

Meiser studied chemistry at the Ludwig-Maximilians-Universität München (LMU), where he carried out his doctoral research thesis, titled "Ueber Homophtalsäureester, Oxymethylenhomophthalsäureester und die aus ihm entstehenden Isocumarin-und Isocarbostyril-Derivate". He held several research and teaching positions at the same university. In addition, he worked at the Chemistry Institute of Kgl Bayr. Akad. d. Wissensch, in Munich, and also in the Universitäts laboratorium in Leipzig. His career involved laboratory research, lecturing, and supervision of graduate students. He published several scientific papers in peer-reviewed journals, focusing on analytical techniques, chemical synthesis, and experimental methods. His work contributed to improvements in laboratory procedures and chemical reaction analysis.

== Selected publications ==
- Lieblein, Johann, and Wilhelm Meiser. Lösungen zu Aufgaben aus der algebraischen Analysis. Korn, 1910.
- Meiser, Wilhelm Ottmar. Ueber Homophthalsäureester, Oxymethylen-homophthalsäureester und die aus ihm entstehenden Isocumarin-und Isocarbostyril-Derivate. Jacob, 1909.
- Meiser, Wilhelm. Über neue Methoden der chemischen Analyse. Journal für Praktische Chemie, 86(3), 245–260, 1912.

== See also ==
- German inventors and discoverers
- Carl Bosch
