= Strength (explosive) =

In explosive materials, strength is the parameter determining the ability of the explosive to move the surrounding material. It is related to the total gas yield of the reaction, and the amount of heat produced. It is distinguished from brisance, which describes the shattering effect of an explosion.

The strength, or potential, of an explosive is the total work that can be performed by the gas resulting from its explosion, when expanded adiabatically from its original volume, until its pressure is reduced to atmospheric pressure and its temperature to 15 °C. The potential is therefore the total quantity of heat given off at constant volume when expressed in equivalent work units and is a measure of the strength of the explosive.

Explosive strength is measured by, for example, the Trauzl lead block test.

An explosion may occur under two general conditions: the first, unconfined, as in the open air where the pressure (atmospheric) is constant; the second, confined, as in a closed chamber where the volume is constant. The same amount of heat energy is liberated in each case, but in the unconfined explosion, a certain amount is used as work energy in pushing back the surrounding air, and therefore is lost as heat. In a confined explosion, where the explosive volume is small (such as occurs in the powder chamber of a firearm), practically all the heat of explosion is conserved as useful energy. If the quantity of heat liberated at constant volume under adiabatic conditions is calculated and converted from heat units to equivalent work units, the potential or capacity for work results.

Therefore, if

Q_{mp} represents the total quantity of heat given off by a mole of explosive of 15°C and constant pressure (atmospheric);
Q_{mv} represents the total heat given off by a mole of explosive at 15°C and constant volume; and
W represents the work energy expended in pushing back the surrounding air in an unconfined explosion and thus is not available as net theoretical heat;

Then, because of the conversion of energy to work in the constant pressure case,

Q_{mv} = Q_{mp} + W

from which the value of Q_{mv} may be determined. Subsequently, the potential of a mole of an explosive may be calculated. Using this value, the potential for any other weight of explosive may be determined by simple proportion.

Using the principle of the initial and final state, and heat of formation table (resulting from experimental data), the heat released at constant pressure may be readily calculated.

m n
Q_{mp} = v_{i}Q_{fi} - v_{k}Q_{fk}
1 1

where:

Q_{fi} = heat of formation of product i at constant pressure
Q_{fk} = heat of formation of reactant k at constant pressure
v = number of moles of each product/reactants (m is the number of products and n the number of reactants)

The work energy expended by the gaseous products of detonation is expressed by:

W = P dv

With pressure constant and negligible initial volume, this expression reduces to:

W = P·V_{2}

Since heats of formation are calculated for standard atmospheric pressure (101 325 Pa, where 1 Pa = 1 N/m^{2}) and 15 °C, V_{2} is the volume occupied by the product gases under these conditions. At this point

W/mol = (101 325 N/m^{2})(23.63 L/mol)(1 m^{3}/1000 L) = 2394 N·m/mol = 2394 J/mol

and by applying the appropriate conversion factors, work can be converted to units of kilocalories.

W/mol = 0.572 kcal/mol

Once the chemical reaction has been balanced, one can calculate the volume of gas produced and the work of expansion. With this completed, the calculations necessary to determine potential may be accomplished.

For TNT:

C_{6}H_{2}(NO_{2})_{3}CH_{3} → 6CO + 2.5H_{2} + 1.5N_{2} + C

for 10 mol

Then:

Q_{mp} = 6(26.43) – 16.5 = 142.08 kcal/mol

Note: Elements in their natural state (H_{2}, O_{2}, N_{2}, C, etc.) are used as the basis for heat of formation tables and are assigned a value of zero. See table 12–2.

Q_{mv} = 142.08 + 0.572(10) = 147.8 kcal/mol

As previously stated, Q_{mv} converted to equivalent work units is the potential of the explosive. (MW = Molecular Weight of Explosive)

Potential = Q_{mv} kcal/mol × 4185 J/kcal × 1000 g/kg × 1 mol/(mol·g)
Potential = Q_{mv} (4.185 million) J/(mol·kg)

For TNT,

Potential = 147.8 (4.185 million)/227.1 = 2.72 million J/kg

Rather than tabulate such large numbers, in the field of explosives, TNT is taken as the standard explosive, and others are assigned strengths relative to that of TNT. The potential of TNT has been calculated above to be 2.72 million J/kg. Relative strength (RS) may be expressed as

R.S. = Potential of Explosive/(2.72 million)
