= Urea nitrate =

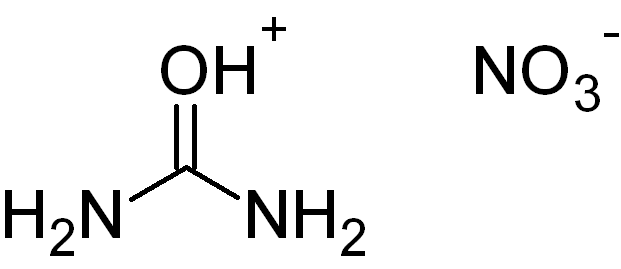
- Structural formulae of the ions in urea nitrate

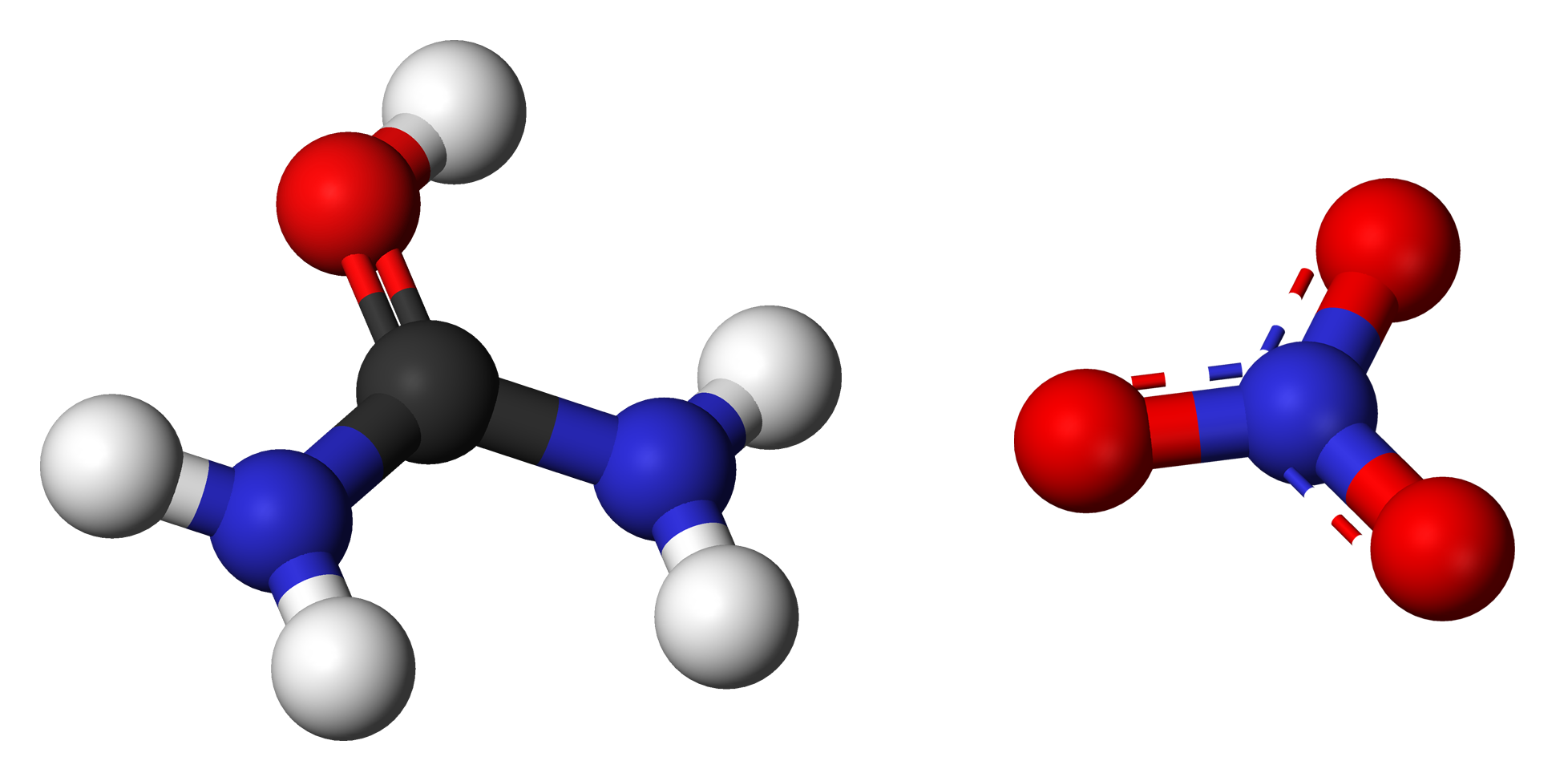
- Ball-and-stick models of the ions in urea nitrate

Identifiers
| CAS Number | 124-47-0 |
| 3D model (JSmol) | Interactive image |
| ChemSpider | 29035 |
| ECHA InfoCard | 100.004.276 |
| PubChem CID | 31295 |
| UNII | DHJ35702MG |
| CompTox Dashboard (EPA) | DTXSID60924672 |
- InChI: InChI=1S/CH4N2O.HNO3/c2*2-1(3)4/h(H4,2,3,4);(H,2,3,4) Key: AYTGUZPQPXGYFS-UHFFFAOYSA-N; InChI=1/CH4N2O.HNO3/c2*2-1(3)4/h(H4,2,3,4);(H,2,3,4) Key: AYTGUZPQPXGYFS-UHFFFAOYAL
- SMILES: C(=O)(N)N.[N+](=O)(O)[O-]

Properties
| Chemical formula | (NH_{2})_{2}COHNO_{3} |
| Molar mass | 123.068 g·mol^{−1} |
| Appearance | Colorless monoclinic leaflets |
| Density | 1.67±0.011 g/cm^{3} |
| Melting point | 157–159 °C (315–318 °F; 430–432 K) |
| Solubility in water | 167.2±0.5 mg/mL |
| Solubility in Ethanol | 14.2±0.1 mg/mL |
| Solubility in Acetone | 10.4±0.2 mg/mL |
| Solubility in Methanol | 54.8±0.9 mg/mL |

Thermochemistry
| Std enthalpy of formation (Δ_{f}H^{⦵}_{298}) | 1090 kcal/kg |
| Std enthalpy of combustion (Δ_{c}H^{⦵}_{298}) | 1071.7 cal/g |

Structure
| Crystal structure | Monoclinic |
| Space group | P2_{1}/c |
| Lattice constant | a = 9.527±0.007 Å, b = 8.203±0.005 Å, c = 7.523±0.006 Å α = 90°, β = 124.37±0.05°, γ = 90° |
| Formula units (Z) | 4 |

Explosive data
| Shock sensitivity | Insensitive, up to 49 N⋅m with no reaction. |
| Friction sensitivity | Insensitive |
| Detonation velocity | 3400 m/s (d=0.85 g/cm^{3}, 30mm paper tube); 4700 m/s (d=1.20 g/cm^{3}, 30mm steel tube) |
| RE factor | 0.92 (ballistic mortar); ~1.0 (trauzl test) |

Hazards
- GHS labelling
| Pictograms | (GHS01: Explosive) (GHS03: Oxidizing) (GHS05: Corrosive) |
| Signal word | Danger |
| Hazard statements | H228, H319 |
| Precautionary statements | P210, P240, P241, P264, P280, P305+P351+P338, P370+P378 |
| Flash point | 72.7 °C (162.9 °F; 345.8 K) |
- Except where otherwise noted, data are given for materials in their standard state (at 25 °C [77 °F], 100 kPa). verify (what is ?) Infobox references

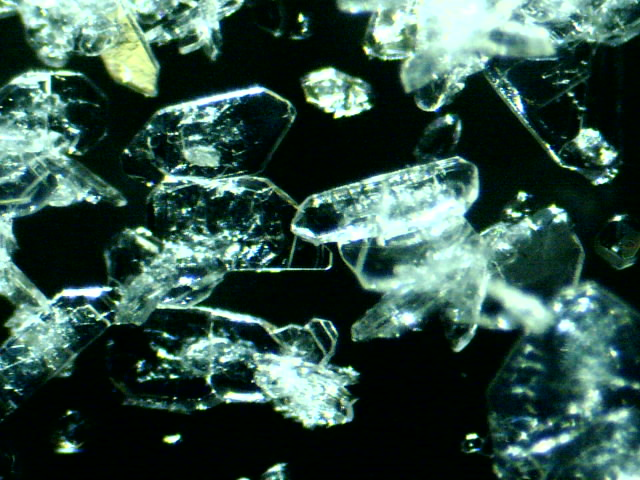
Crystals of urea nitrate

Urea nitrate is a fertilizer-based high explosive with the chemical formula of CH_{5}N_{3}O_{4} (or (NH_{2})_{2}COHNO_{3}) that has been used in improvised explosive devices in Afghanistan, Pakistan, Iraq, and various terrorist acts elsewhere in the world such as in the 1993 World Trade Center bombing.

== Synthesis ==
Urea nitrate is produced in one step by reaction of urea with nitric acid. This is an exothermic reaction, so steps must be taken to control the temperature.

== Chemistry ==
Urea contains a carbonyl group. The more electronegative oxygen atom pulls electrons away from the carbon atom, forming a polar bond with greater electron density around the oxygen atom, giving it a partial negative charge. In a simplistic sense, nitric acid dissociates in aqueous solution into protons (hydrogen cations) and nitrate anions. The electrophilic proton contributed by the acid is attracted to the negatively charged oxygen atom on the urea molecule and the two form a covalent bond. Paired with the spectator nitrate counteranion, it forms urea nitrate.

(NH_{2})_{2}CO(aq) + HNO_{3}(aq) → [(NH_{2})_{2}COH]^{+}[NO_{3}]^{−}(s)

== History ==
It was discovered in 1797 by William Cruickshank, inventor of the Chloralkali process.

== Explosive properties ==
It has a destructive power similar to better-known ammonium nitrate explosives, with a velocity of detonation between 3,400 m/s (11,155 ft/s) and 4,700 m/s (15,420 ft/s). Urea nitrate must be initiated using a blasting cap.

The compound has frequently been used by terrorist and criminal groups due to its ease of production and low skill level required for synthesis. This is due to the ease of acquiring the materials necessary to synthesize it, and its greater sensitivity to initiation compared to ammonium nitrate based explosives.
