= Urea phosphate =

Names
- IUPAC name phosphoric acid;urea

Identifiers
CAS Number	4401-74-5; 4861-19-2
3D model (JSmol)	Interactive image
ChemSpider	19748
ECHA InfoCard	100.023.149
EC Number	225-464-3
PubChem CID	20994
UNII	TJR09610O7
CompTox Dashboard (EPA)	DTXSID3063627
- InChI: InChI=1S/CH4N2O.H3O4P/c2-1(3)4;1-5(2,3)4/h(H4,2,3,4);(H3,1,2,3,4) Key: DZHMRSPXDUUJER-UHFFFAOYSA-N
- SMILES: C(=O)(N)N.OP(=O)(O)O

Properties
Chemical formula	CH_{7}N_{2}O_{5}P
Molar mass	158.050 g·mol^{−1}

Hazards
- GHS labelling
Pictograms	(GHS05: Corrosive)
Signal word	Danger
Hazard statements	H314
Precautionary statements	P260, P264, P280, P301+P330+P331, P303+P361+P353, P304+P340, P305+P351+P338, P310, P321, P363, P405, P501
- Except where otherwise noted, data are given for materials in their standard state (at 25 °C [77 °F], 100 kPa). Infobox references

Urea phosphate is a 1:1 combination of urea and phosphoric acid that is used as a fertilizer. It has an NPK formula of 17-44-0, and is soluble in water, producing a strongly acidic solution.

Urea phosphate is available in fertilizer vendor bags that carry a UP signet on the packaging. It is sometimes added to blends which contain calcium nitrate, magnesium nitrate and potassium nitrate to produce water-soluble formulas such as 15-5-15 and 13-2-20. The acidity of urea phosphate allows Ca, Mg and P to co-exist in solution. Under less acidic conditions, there would be precipitation of Ca–Mg phosphates. Urea phosphate is often used in drip irrigation to clean pipe systems.

The phosphoric acid and urea molecules in the urea phosphate crystal structure form a complex hydrogen-bonding network, with the hydrogen atoms bonding more strongly to urea molecules. It freely dissociates when dissolved in water.

Urea phosphate is produced as a non-ionic adduct of urea and phosphoric acid, with the typical 17-44-0 grade of fertilizer produced using wet process phosphoric acid at concentrations that vary from 54% to 90%:

H_{3}PO_{4}(aq) + (NH_{2})_{2}CO(s) → (NH_{2})_{2}CO · H_{3}PO_{4}(s)
