= Formylhydrazine =

Chemical compound

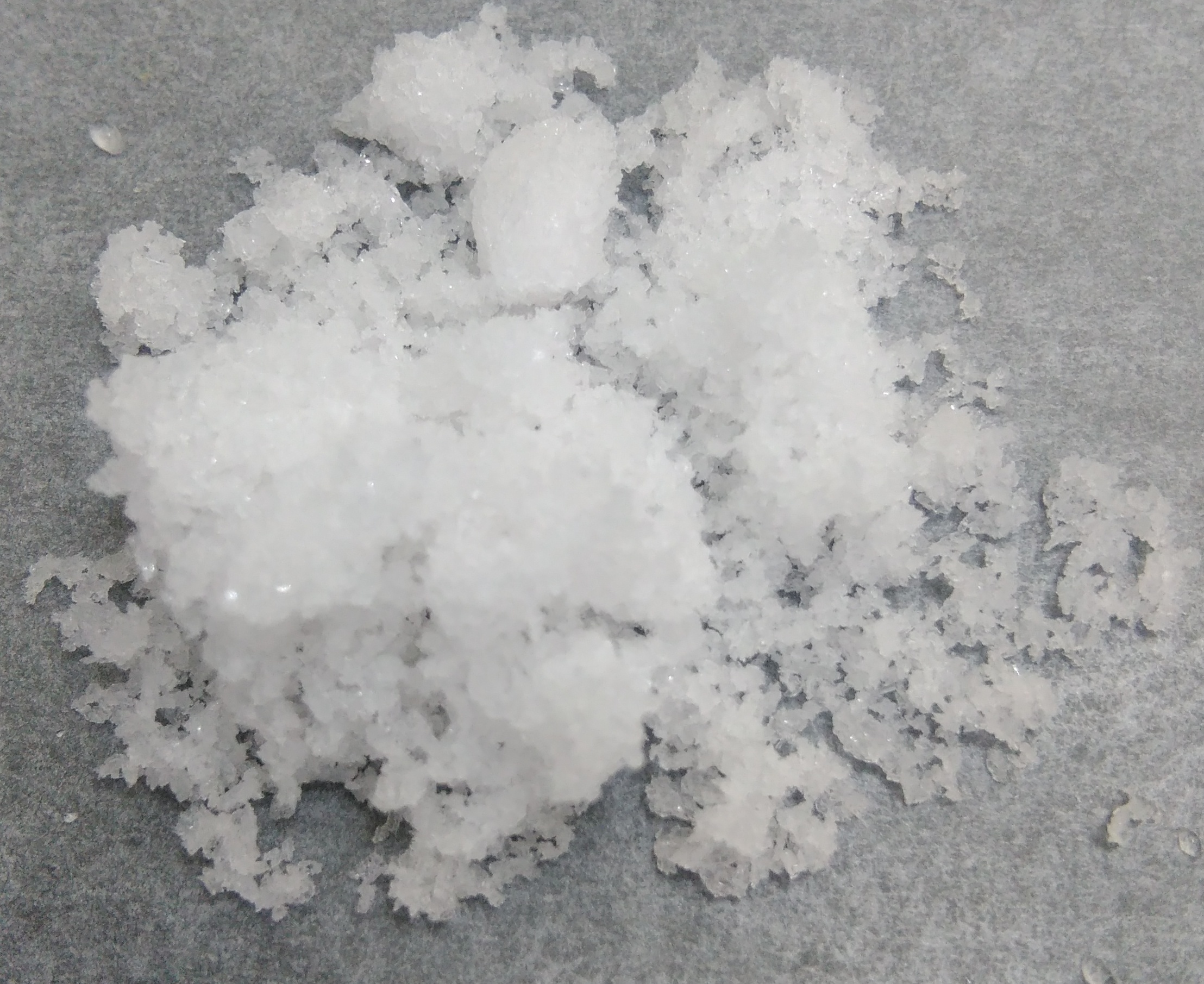

Names
- Preferred IUPAC name Formohydrazide
- Systematic IUPAC name Methanehydrazide
- Other names Formic hydrazide

Identifiers
CAS Number	624-84-0
3D model (JSmol)	Interactive image
Beilstein Reference	635759
ChemSpider	11728
ECHA InfoCard	100.009.880
EC Number	210-867-9
PubChem CID	12229
RTECS number	LQ8615000
UNII	V1D8X13QFN
CompTox Dashboard (EPA)	DTXSID6020642
- InChI: InChI=1S/CH4N2O/c2-3-1-4/h1H,2H2,(H,3,4) Key: XZBIXDPGRMLSTC-UHFFFAOYSA-N
- SMILES: C(=O)NN

Properties
Chemical formula	CH_{4}N_{2}O
Molar mass	60.056 g·mol^{−1}
Melting point	54 °C (129 °F; 327 K)
Solubility in water	yes
Solubility	ethanol

Hazards
- GHS labelling
Pictograms	(GHS07: Exclamation mark)
Signal word	Warning
Hazard statements	H315, H319, H335, H336
Precautionary statements	P261, P264, P271, P280, P302+P352, P304+P340, P305+P351+P338, P312, P321, P332+P313, P337+P313, P362, P403+P233, P405, P501

Related compounds
Related compounds	acetyl hydrazine, benzoyl hydrazine, diformyl hydrazine, N-methyl-N-formylhydrazine
- Except where otherwise noted, data are given for materials in their standard state (at 25 °C [77 °F], 100 kPa). Infobox references

Formylhydrazine is a chemical compound with the molecular formula CH_{4}N_{2}O and it has a mass of 60 g/mol. It is also known as formic acid hydrazide, hydrazinecarboxaldehyde, formohydrazide, or formic hydrazide. It is one of the simplest compounds in the hydrazide class. Formylhydrazine can act as a bidentate ligand with cobalt, zinc, or cadmium.

This is also an isomer of urea in the sense of which the hydrogen atom on the amine group has transferred to the carbonyl group.

== Formation ==
Formylhydrazine can be produced by the acid hydrolysis of diazomethane:

H_{2}CN_{2} + H_{2}O → HC(O)NHNH_{2}.

== Properties ==
Formylhydrazine causes lung cancer in mice.
