= Stamicarbon =

Market leader in licensing technology for manufacturing urea

Stamicarbon is the licensing and IP center of Maire Tecnimont SpA which licenses technology for manufacturing urea as well as provides follow-up services designed to ensure the best possible operation of the urea plant throughout its working life. Stamicarbon is based in Sittard-Geleen.

== History ==
=== Introduction ===
From its inception in 1947 until 2009 Stamicarbon was a subsidiary of DSM (formerly Dutch State Mines). In 2009 it was sold to Maire Tecnimont. DSM created Stamicarbon for the purpose of managing its patent portfolio and licensing its technology. In 1947 DSM was primarily a coal mining company and initially Stamicarbon was responsible for selling coal preparation plant technology. The company's name reflects its origin: 'Stami' (from 'State Mines') and 'carbon'(coal). In the succeeding years, reflecting the progressive shift of DSM's activities from coal mining to chemicals derived from coal and, later, from natural gas, Stamicarbon's technology portfolio grew to include a number of other products, including urea and the urea derivative melamine, caprolactam, polyethylene, phenol, and EPDM rubber.

Following the takeover of DSM's petrochemical activities in 2002 by the Saudi Arabian company SABIC, licensing activities for all but urea and LLDPE technology were also transferred to SABIC's licensing subsidiary, SABTEC. The melamine license was taken over by OCI Nitrogen.

=== The move to urea ===
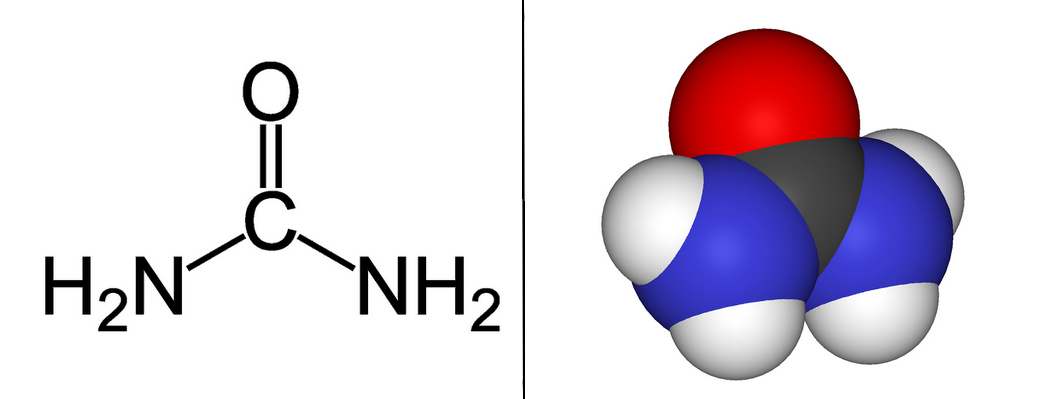
Urea

Although urea has a number of industrial uses, these are dwarfed by the scale of its use as a nitrogen fertilizer. Urea has the highest nitrogen content (46 wt-%) of all the recognized solid nitrogen fertilizer materials and, from the early 1950s onwards, its use has continually increased, progressively displacing both ammonium sulphate, which was formerly the dominant product, and a later contender, ammonium nitrate. Today the market stands at about 170 million metric tonnes per year and is still growing at an annual rate of about 3%. By 2025 world food production will have to double to cater for the food demand of approximately 8 billion people. Since the area under cultivation is tending to decrease rather than increase, the extra food will have to be produced by further increasing the yield per hectare of existing agricultural land. The use of fertilizers, urea in particular, can assist with this problem. In December 1953, when DSM was establishing its urea manufacturing activity, it made the decision not to seek a license for any existing urea technology but rather to develop its own technology in house. In 1957, Stamicarbon sold its first urea license to Société Carbochimique in Tertre, Belgium, for a plant with a capacity of 70 metric tons per day (mtpd). Due to the growth of the world urea market, urea occupied an important position in Stamicarbon's portfolio.

== Urea Symposium ==
Once every four years Stamicarbon holds its Urea Symposium, at which new technical developments are introduced and social contacts are established or refreshed. First held in 1966, when it was attended by 31 participants, representing 16 licensees from 11 countries, the invited audience has been expanded to include contractors and equipment suppliers. Attendance at the most recent symposium in 2016 numbered 300.
