= Urea perchlorate =

Identifiers
CAS Number	18727-07-6
3D model (JSmol)	Interactive image
ChemSpider	23078714
PubChem CID	12201323
CompTox Dashboard (EPA)	DTXSID70480219
- InChI: InChI=1S/CH4N2O.ClHO4/c2-1(3)4;2-1(3,4)5/h(H4,2,3,4);(H,2,3,4,5) Key: CLXPQCKVAYIJQB-UHFFFAOYSA-N; InChI=1/CH4N2O.ClHO4/c2-1(3)4;2-1(3,4)5/h(H4,2,3,4);(H,2,3,4,5) Key: CLXPQCKVAYIJQB-UHFFFAOYAD
- SMILES: C(=O)([NH3+])N.[O-]Cl(=O)(=O)=O

Properties
Chemical formula	CO(NH_{2})_{2}·HClO_{4}
Molar mass	159.51 g/mol
Appearance	Crystals
Melting point	83 °C (181 °F; 356 K)
Solubility in water	Large solubility in water
- Except where otherwise noted, data are given for materials in their standard state (at 25 °C [77 °F], 100 kPa). Infobox references

Urea perchlorate is a sheet-shaped crystallite with good chemical stability and strong hygroscopicity. It has usage as an oxidizer in liquid explosives including underwater blasting.

== Synthesis ==
The compound is synthesized by gradual addition of urea into a perchloric acid solution:

CO(NH_{2})_{2} + HClO_{4} → CO(NH_{2})_{2}·HClO_{4}

An alternative route is addition of urea to hydrochloric acid solution, followed by addition of sodium perchlorate, and filtration of the salt.

NaClO_{4}·H_{2}O + CO(NH_{2})_{2} + HCl → CO(NH_{2})_{2}·HClO_{4} + NaCl + H_{2}O
