= Wöhler synthesis =

Synthetic production of urea from ammonium cyanate

The Wöhler synthesis is the conversion of ammonium cyanate into urea. This chemical reaction was described in 1828 by Friedrich Wöhler. It is often cited as the starting point of modern organic chemistry. Although the Wöhler reaction concerns the conversion of ammonium cyanate, this salt appears only as an (unstable) intermediate. Wöhler demonstrated the reaction in his original publication with different sets of reactants: a combination of cyanic acid and ammonia, a combination of silver cyanate and ammonium chloride, a combination of lead cyanate and ammonia and finally from a combination of mercury cyanate and cyanatic ammonia (which is again cyanic acid with ammonia).

== Modified versions of the Wöhler synthesis ==
The reaction can be demonstrated by starting with solutions of potassium cyanate and ammonium chloride which are mixed, heated and cooled again. An additional proof of the chemical transformation is obtained by adding a solution of oxalic acid which forms urea oxalate as a white precipitate.

Alternatively the reaction can be carried out with lead cyanate and ammonia. The actual reaction taking place is a double displacement reaction to form ammonium cyanate:

Pb(OCN)_{2} + 2 NH_{3} + 2 H_{2}O → Pb(OH)_{2} + 2NH_{4}(OCN)

Ammonium cyanate decomposes to ammonia and cyanic acid which in turn react to produce urea:

NH_{4}(OCN) → NH_{3} + HOCN ⇌ (NH_{2})_{2}CO

Complexation with oxalic acid drives this chemical equilibrium to completion.

== Debate ==
That Wöhler's synthesis sparked the downfall of the theory of vitalism, which states that organic matter possessed a certain "vital force" common to all living things, is disputed. Prior to the Wöhler synthesis, the work of John Dalton and Jöns Jacob Berzelius had already convinced chemists that organic and inorganic matter obey the same chemical laws. It took until 1845 when Kolbe reported another inorganic – organic conversion (of carbon disulfide to acetic acid) before vitalism started to lose support. Wöhler also did not, as some textbooks have claimed, act as a "crusader" against vitalism. A 2000 survey by historian Peter Ramberg found that 90% of chemical textbooks repeat some version of the Wöhler myth.
