= Trauzl lead block test =

Test for the measure of explosive materials

The Trauzl lead block test, also called the Trauzl test, or just Trauzl, is a test used to measure the strength of explosive materials. It was developed by Isidor Trauzl in 1885.

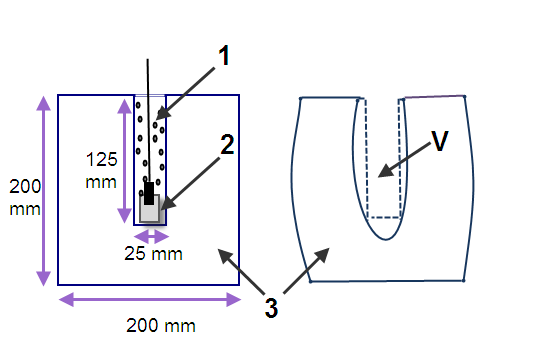
Trauzl lead block before and after a test (1 – sand | 2 – Explosive and detonator | 3 – lead)

The test is performed by loading a 10-gram foil-wrapped sample of the explosive into a hole drilled into a lead block with specific dimensions and properties (a soft lead cylinder, 200 mm diameter and 200 mm high, with the hole 125 mm deep, and 25 mm diameter). The hole is then topped up with sand, and the sample is detonated electrically. After detonation, the volume increase of the cavity is measured. The result, given in cm^{3}, is called the Trauzl number of the explosive.

The Trauzl test is not useful for some modern higher-powered explosives as their power often cracks or otherwise ruptures the lead block, leaving no hole to measure.

A variant of the test uses an aluminium block to avoid exposure of participants to lead-related hazards.

== Examples ==
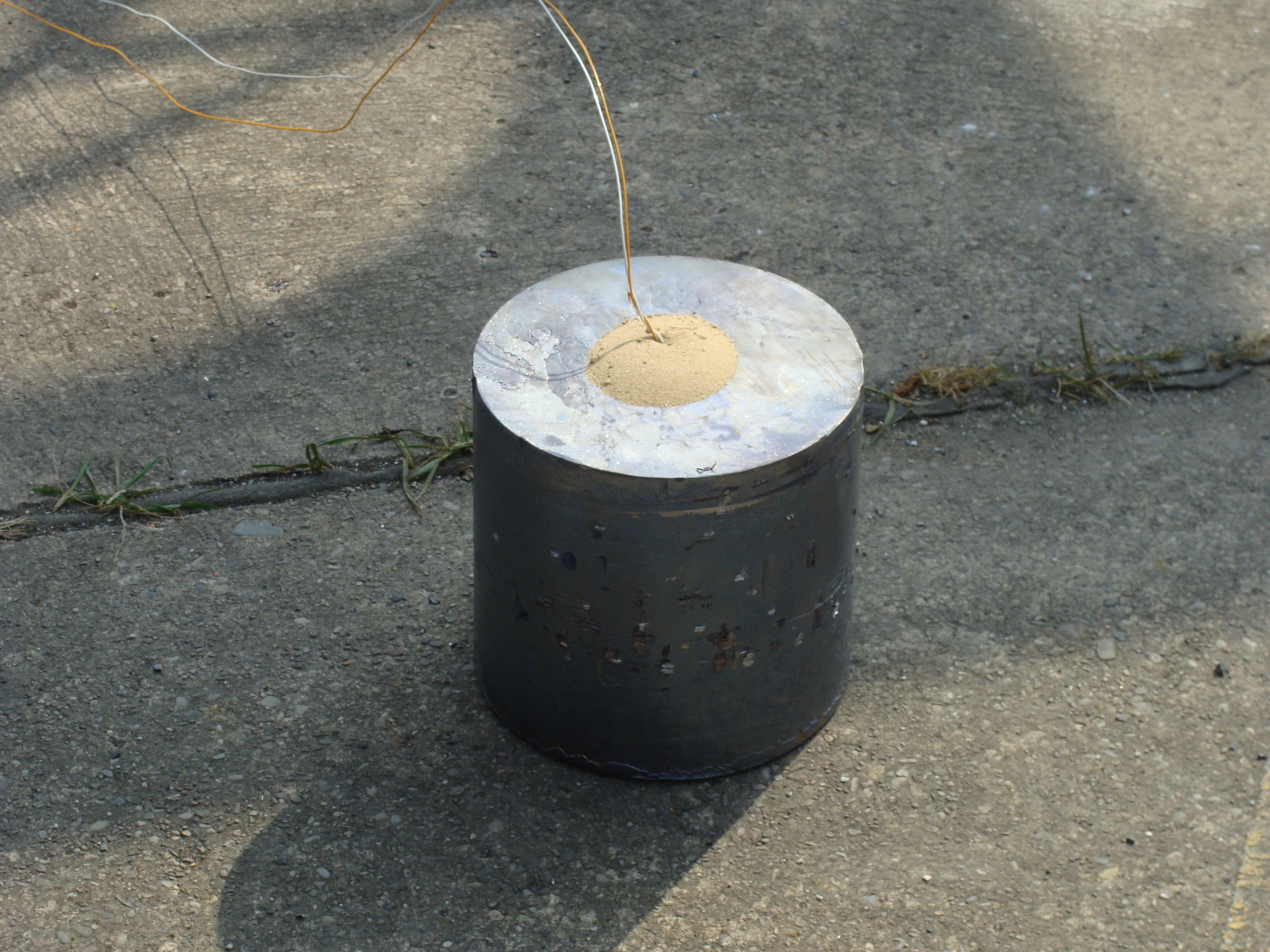

Explosive power of chemical explosives by Trauzl number:

| Explosive | Trauzl rating (cm³/g) |
|---|---|
| Dinitrophenol (DNP) | 24 |
| Acetone peroxide | 25 |
| RDX (C4/Hexogen) | 48 |
| HMTD | 33 |
| HMX (octogen) | 48 |
| Nitroglycerin | 52 |
| Pentaerythritol tetranitrate | 52.3 |
| Trinitrotoluene (TNT) | 30 |
