= Ammonium cyanate =

Ionic chemical compound with formula [NH4]+ [OCN]-

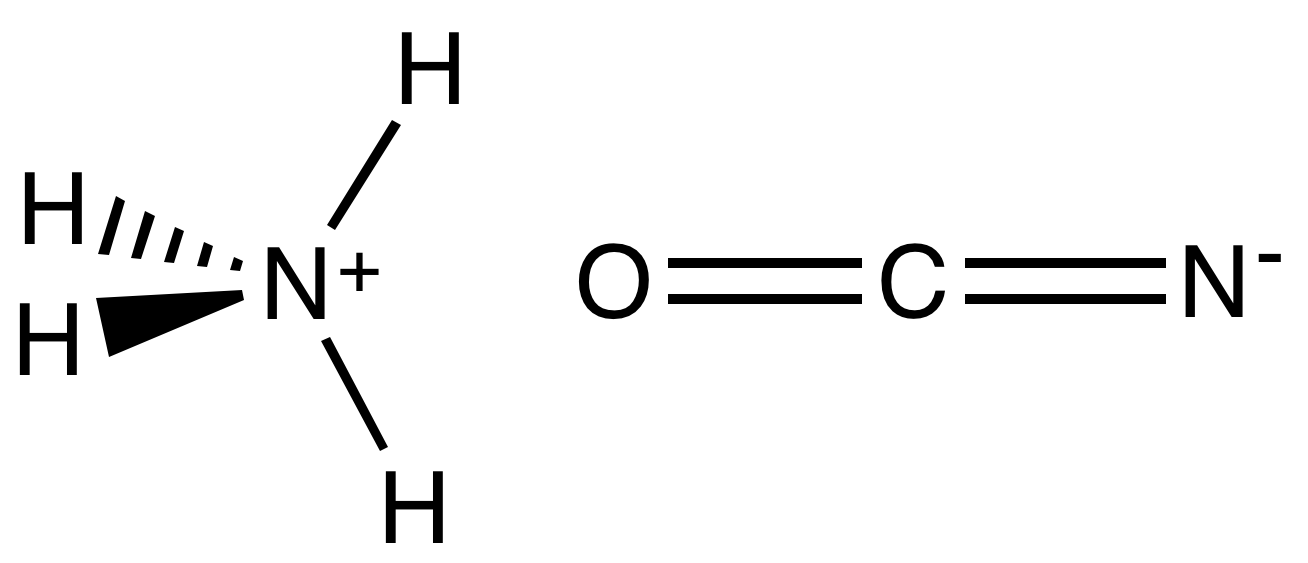

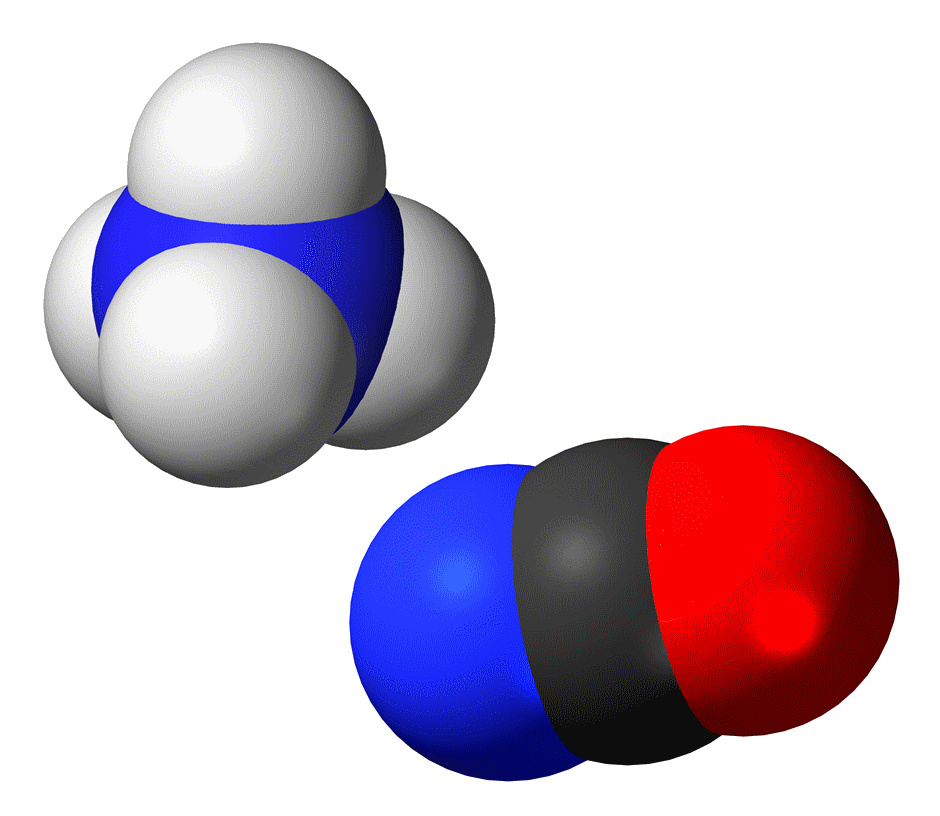

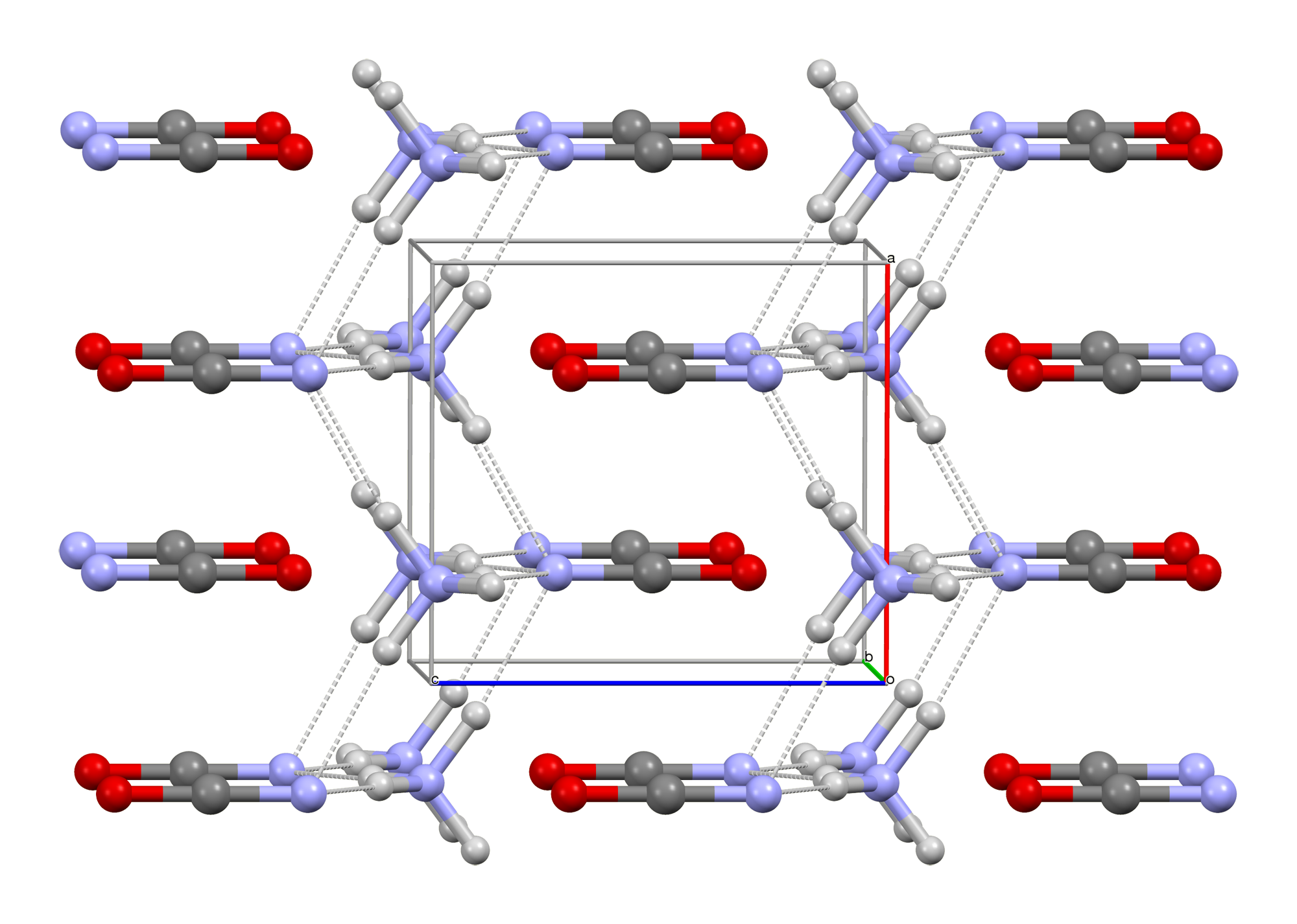

Identifiers
CAS Number	22981-32-4
3D model (JSmol)	Interactive image
ChemSpider	2339431
PubChem CID	9793686
CompTox Dashboard (EPA)	DTXSID40177528
- InChI: InChI=1S/CHNO.H3N/c2-1-3;/h3H;1H3 Key: QYTOONVFPBUIJG-UHFFFAOYSA-N
- SMILES: C(#N)[O-].[NH4+]

Properties
Chemical formula	[NH_{4}][OCN]
Molar mass	60.056 g·mol^{−1}
Appearance	Colorless crystals
- Except where otherwise noted, data are given for materials in their standard state (at 25 °C [77 °F], 100 kPa). Infobox references

Ammonium cyanate is an inorganic compound with the formula [NH_{4}]^{+}[OCN]^{−}. It is a colorless, solid salt.

== Structure and reactions ==
The structure of this salt was verified by X-ray crystallography. The respective C–O and C–N distances are 1.174(8) and 1.192(7) Å, consistent with the O=C=N^{−} description. Ammonium cation [NH_{4}]^{+} forms hydrogen bonds with cyanate anion O=C=N^{−}, but to N, not to O.

The compound is notable as the precursor in the Wöhler synthesis of urea, an organic compound, from inorganic reactants.

NH^{+}_{4} + OCN^{−} → (NH_{2})_{2}CO

This is generally credited as the first total synthesis of an organic compound. Wöhler's work with ammonium cyanate is sometimes credited for ending support for vitalism in the sciences, but this account has been criticised by both historians and chemists as reductive.

== Preparation ==
Ammonium cyanate can be produced with solutions of potassium cyanate and ammonium chloride which are mixed, heated and cooled.

Alternatively the reaction can be carried out with lead cyanate and ammonia.

Pb(OCN)_{2} + 2 NH_{3} + 2 H_{2}O → Pb(OH)_{2} + 2NH_{4}(OCN)

Molten urea decomposes into ammonium cyanate at about 152 °C (306 °F):

CO(NH_{2})_{2} → [NH_{4}]^{+}[OCN]^{−}
