= Urea =

Organic compound

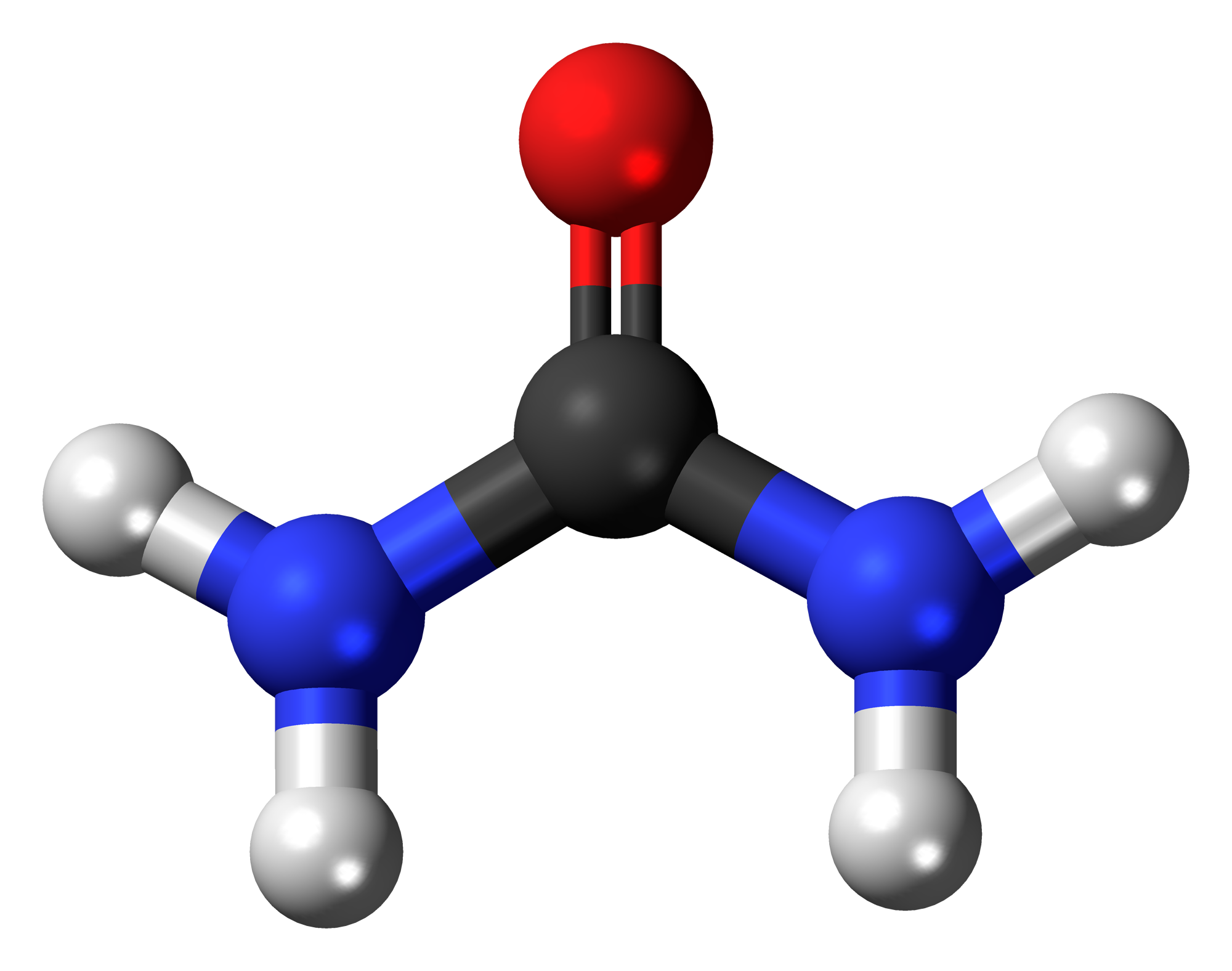

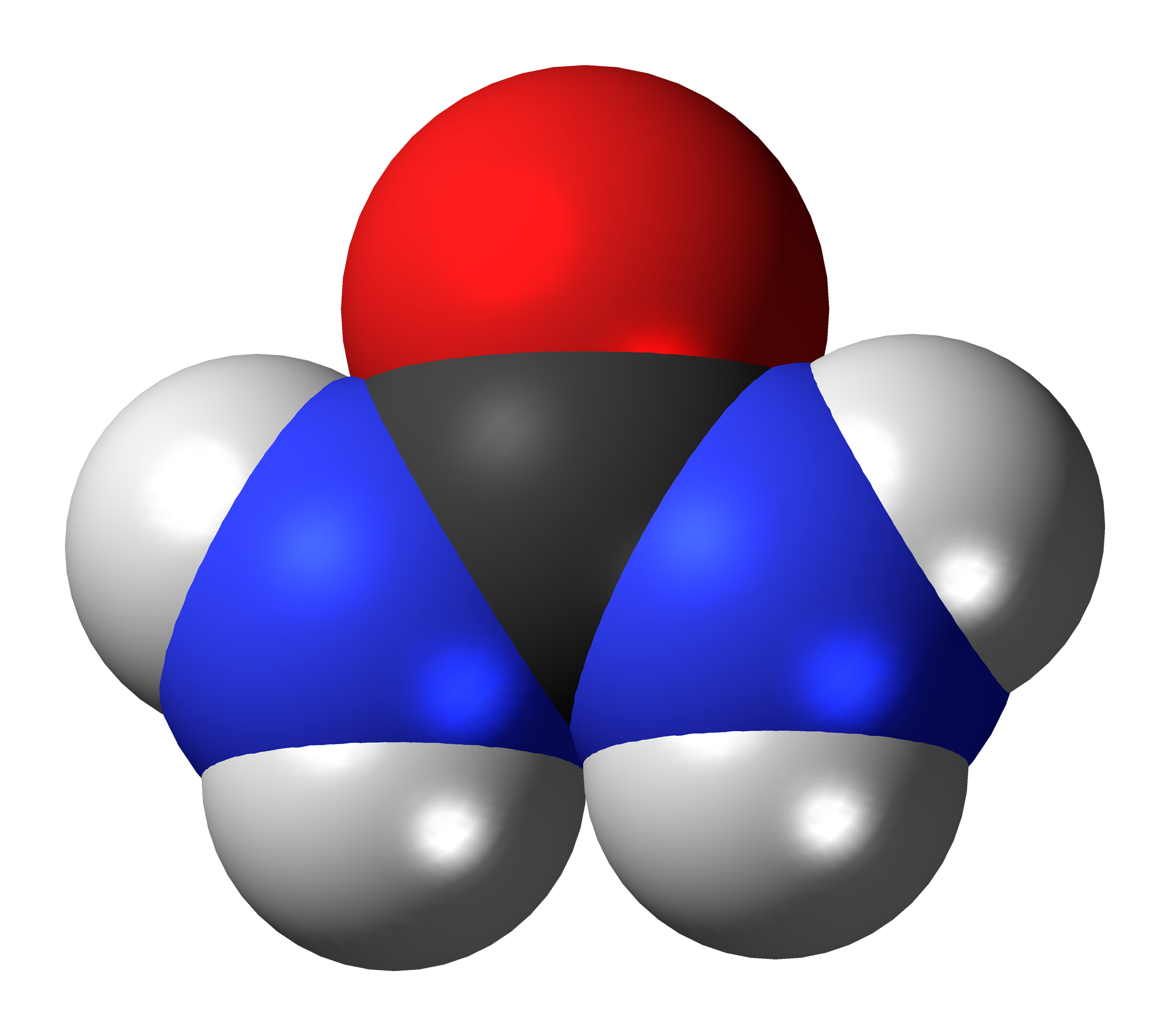

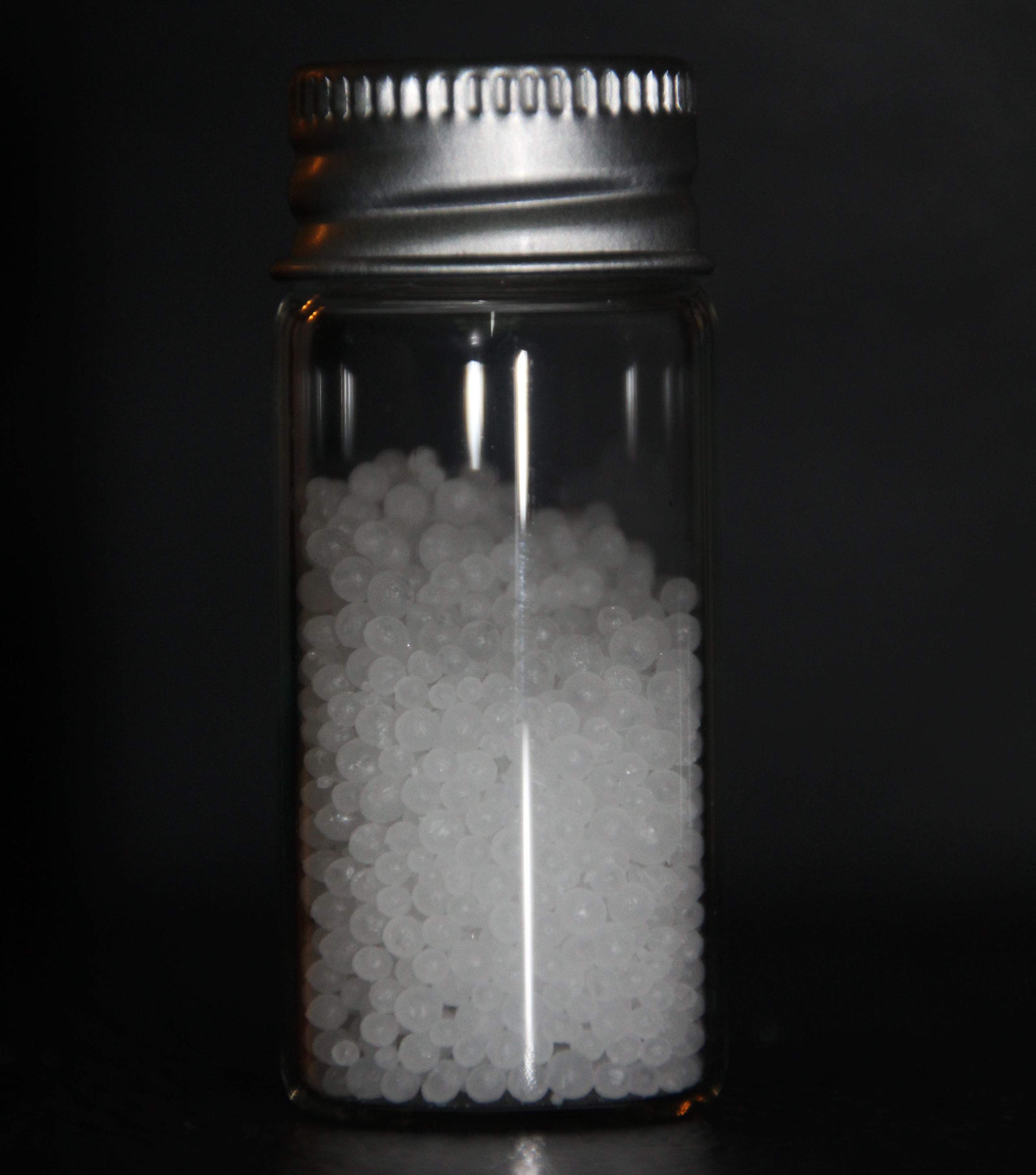

Names
Pronunciation	urea /jʊəˈriːə/, carbamide /ˈkɑːrbəmaɪd/
- Preferred IUPAC name Urea
- Systematic IUPAC name Carbonic diamide
- Other names: Carbamide; Carbonyldiamide; Carbonyldiamine; Diaminomethanal; Diaminomethanone

Identifiers
CAS Number	57-13-6
3D model (JSmol)	Interactive image
Beilstein Reference	635724
ChEBI	CHEBI:16199
ChEMBL	ChEMBL985
ChemSpider	1143
DrugBank	DB03904
ECHA InfoCard	100.000.286
E number	E927b (glazing agents, ...)
Gmelin Reference	1378
IUPHAR/BPS	4539
KEGG	D00023
PubChem CID	1176
RTECS number	YR6250000
UNII	8W8T17847W
CompTox Dashboard (EPA)	DTXSID4021426
- InChI: InChI=1S/CH4N2O/c2-1(3)4/h(H4,2,3,4) Key: XSQUKJJJFZCRTK-UHFFFAOYSA-N; InChI=1/CH4N2O/c2-1(3)4/h(H4,2,3,4) Key: XSQUKJJJFZCRTK-UHFFFAOYAF
- SMILES: C(=O)(N)N

Properties
Chemical formula	CO(NH_{2})_{2}
Molar mass	60.056 g·mol^{−1}
Appearance	White solid
Density	1.32 g/cm^{3}
Melting point	132.4 °C (270.3 °F; 405.5 K)
Boiling point	decomposes
Solubility in water	790 g/L (5 °C (41 °F; 278 K)); 1200 g/L (25 °C (77 °F; 298 K))
Solubility in acetonitrile	~4 g/L
Solubility in ethanol	50 g/L
Solubility in glycerol	500 g/L
log P	<−1.73 (22 °C (72 °F; 295 K))
Vapor pressure	1.25 mmHg (167 Pa)
Acidity (pK_{a})	0.1 (conjugate acid)
Basicity (pK_{b})	13.9 (Note: Calculated from 14 − pK_{a}, with the value from the CRC Handbook 97th edition.)
Conjugate acid	Uronium
Magnetic susceptibility (χ)	−33.5×10^{−6} cm^{3}/mol
Refractive index (n_{D})	1.484

Structure
Crystal structure	Tetragonal prisms (from alcohol)
Dipole moment	4.56 D

Thermochemistry
Std enthalpy of formation (Δ_{f}H^{⦵}_{298})	−333.19 kJ/mol

Pharmacology
ATC code	B05BC02 (WHO) D02AE01 (WHO)

Hazards
NFPA 704 (fire diamond)	1 0 0
- Lethal dose or concentration (LD, LC)
LD_{50} (median dose)	8500 mg/kg (oral, rat)
Safety data sheet (SDS)	Fisher Scientific

Related compounds
Related ureas	Thiourea; Hydroxycarbamide
Related compounds	Carbamide peroxide; Nitrourea; Urea nitrate; Urea perchlorate; Urea phosphate
- Except where otherwise noted, data are given for materials in their standard state (at 25 °C [77 °F], 100 kPa). verify (what is ?) Infobox references

Urea, also called carbamide (because it is a diamide of carbonic acid), is an organic compound with chemical formula CO(NH_{2})_{2}. This amide has two amino groups (−NH_{2}) joined by a carbonyl functional group (−C(=O)−). It is thus the simplest amide of carbamic acid.

Urea serves an important role in the cellular metabolism of nitrogen-containing compounds by animals and is the main nitrogen-containing substance in the urine of mammals. The word urea is Neo-Latin, from French urée, from Ancient Greek οὖρον (oûron) 'urine'.

It is a colorless, odorless solid, highly soluble in water, and practically non-toxic. Dissolved in water, it is neither acidic nor alkaline. The body uses it in many processes, most notably nitrogen excretion. In the liver, it forms by the condensation of ammonia (NH_{3}) and carbon dioxide (CO_{2}) in the urea cycle. Urea is widely used in fertilizers as a source of nitrogen (N).

In 1828, Friedrich Wöhler showed that urea can be produced from inorganic starting materials, an important conceptual milestone in chemistry. This showed for the first time that a substance previously known only as a byproduct of life could be synthesized in the laboratory from non-biological starting materials, thereby contradicting the widely held doctrine of vitalism, which stated that organic compounds could only be derived from living organisms.

== Molecular and crystal structure ==
The structure of the molecule of urea is O=C(−NH_{2})_{2}. The urea molecule is planar when in a solid crystal because of sp^{2} hybridization of the N orbitals. It is non-planar with C_{2} symmetry when in the gas phase or in aqueous solution, with C−N−H and H−N−H bond angles that are intermediate between the trigonal planar angle of 120° and the tetrahedral angle of 109.5°. In solid urea, the oxygen center is engaged in two N−H−O hydrogen bonds. The resulting hydrogen-bond network is probably established at the cost of efficient molecular packing: The structure is quite open, the ribbons forming tunnels with square cross-section. The carbon in urea is described as sp^{2} hybridized, the C−N bonds have significant double bond character, and the carbonyl oxygen is relatively basic. Urea's high aqueous solubility reflects its ability to engage in extensive hydrogen bonding with water.

By virtue of its tendency to form porous frameworks, urea has the ability to trap many organic compounds. In these so-called clathrates, the organic "guest" molecules are held in channels formed by interpenetrating helices composed of hydrogen-bonded urea molecules. In this way, urea-clathrates have been well investigated for separations.

== Reactions ==
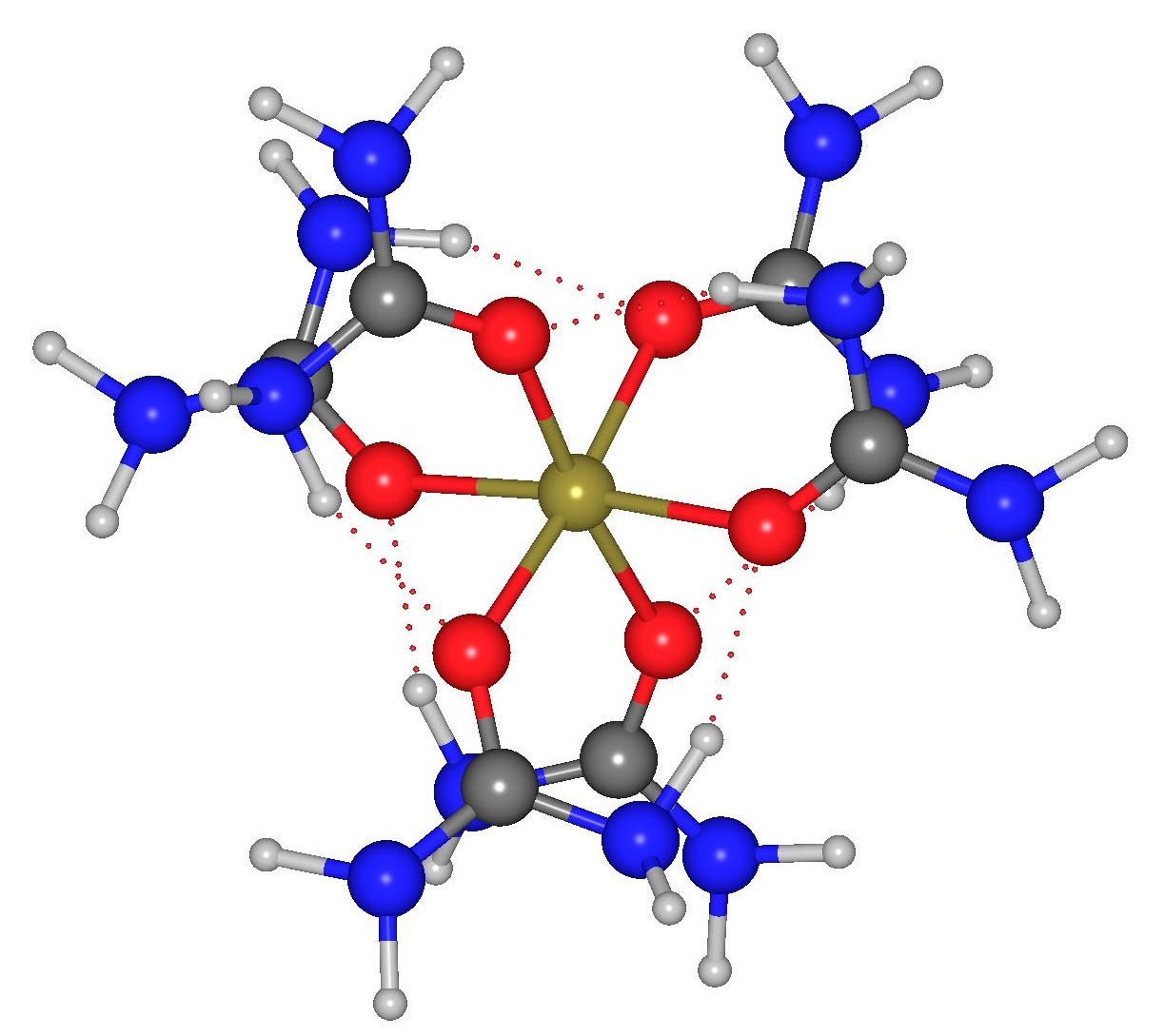
Structure of [Fe(urea)_{6}]^{2+} showing intramolecular hydrogen bonds. Color code: blue = N, red = O.

=== Basicity ===
Urea is a weak base, with a pK_{b} of 13.9. When combined with strong acids, it undergoes protonation at oxygen to form uronium salts. It is a Lewis base, forming metal complexes of the type [M(urea)_{6}]^{n+}.

=== N-functionalization ===
As an electron-rich amide, urea readily undergoes N-functionalization by electrophilic reagents. This property gives rise to several reagents. Nitration occurs at the amine to give N-nitrourea. Chlorination similarly gives N-chlorourea.

=== Transamination ===
Urea undergoes transamination. For example, treatment with anilinium gives both N-phenylurea and N,N'-diphenylurea. N-Methylurea can be prepared by a similar acid-catalyzed pathway.

=== Heterocyclization ===
Urea, being a multifunctional, is a versatile precursor to heterocycles. It reacts with malonic esters to make barbituric acids. With hydroxyketones, urea condenses to give glyoxalones. It is a precursor to pyrimidines.

=== Thermolysis ===
Molten urea decomposes into ammonium cyanate at about 152 °C (306 °F), and into ammonia and isocyanic acid above 160 °C (320 °F):

CO(NH_{2})_{2} → [NH_{4}]^{+}[OCN]^{−} → NH_{3} + HNCO

Heating above 160 °C (320 °F) yields biuret NH_{2}CONHCONH_{2} and triuret NH_{2}CONHCONHCONH_{2} via reaction with isocyanic acid:

CO(NH_{2})_{2} + HNCO → NH_{2}CONHCONH_{2}
NH_{2}CONHCONH_{2} + HNCO → NH_{2}CONHCONHCONH_{2}

At higher temperatures it converts to a range of condensation products, including cyanuric acid (CNOH)_{3}, guanidine HNC(NH_{2})_{2}, and melamine.

=== Hydrolysis ===
In aqueous solution, urea slowly equilibrates with ammonium cyanate. This elimination reaction cogenerates isocyanic acid, which can carbamylate proteins, in particular the N-terminal amino group, the side chain amino of lysine, and to a lesser extent the side chains of arginine and cysteine. Each carbamylation event adds 43 daltons to the mass of the protein, which can be observed in protein mass spectrometry. For this reason, pure urea solutions should be freshly prepared and used, as aged solutions may develop a significant concentration of cyanate (20 mM in 8 M urea). Dissolving urea in ultrapure water followed by removing ions (i.e. cyanate) with a mixed-bed ion-exchange resin and storing that solution at 4 °C (39 °F) is a recommended preparation procedure. However, cyanate will build back up to significant levels within a few days. Alternatively, adding 25–50 mM ammonium chloride to a concentrated urea solution decreases formation of cyanate because of the common ion effect.

== Analysis ==
Urea is readily quantified by a number of different methods, such as the diacetyl monoxime colorimetric method, and the Berthelot reaction (after initial conversion of urea to ammonia via urease). These methods are amenable to high throughput instrumentation, such as automated flow injection analyzers and 96-well micro-plate spectrophotometers.

== Related compounds ==
Urea is the parent for a class of chemical compounds that share the same functional group. Namely, such compounds have a carbonyl group attached to two organic amine residues: R^{1}R^{2}N−C(=O)−NR^{3}R^{4}, where R^{1}, R^{2}, R^{3} and R^{4} groups are hydrogen (–H), organyl or other groups. Examples include carbamide peroxide, allantoin, and hydantoin. Ureas are closely related to biurets and related in structure to amides, carbamates, carbodiimides, and thiocarbamides.

== Uses ==
=== Agriculture ===
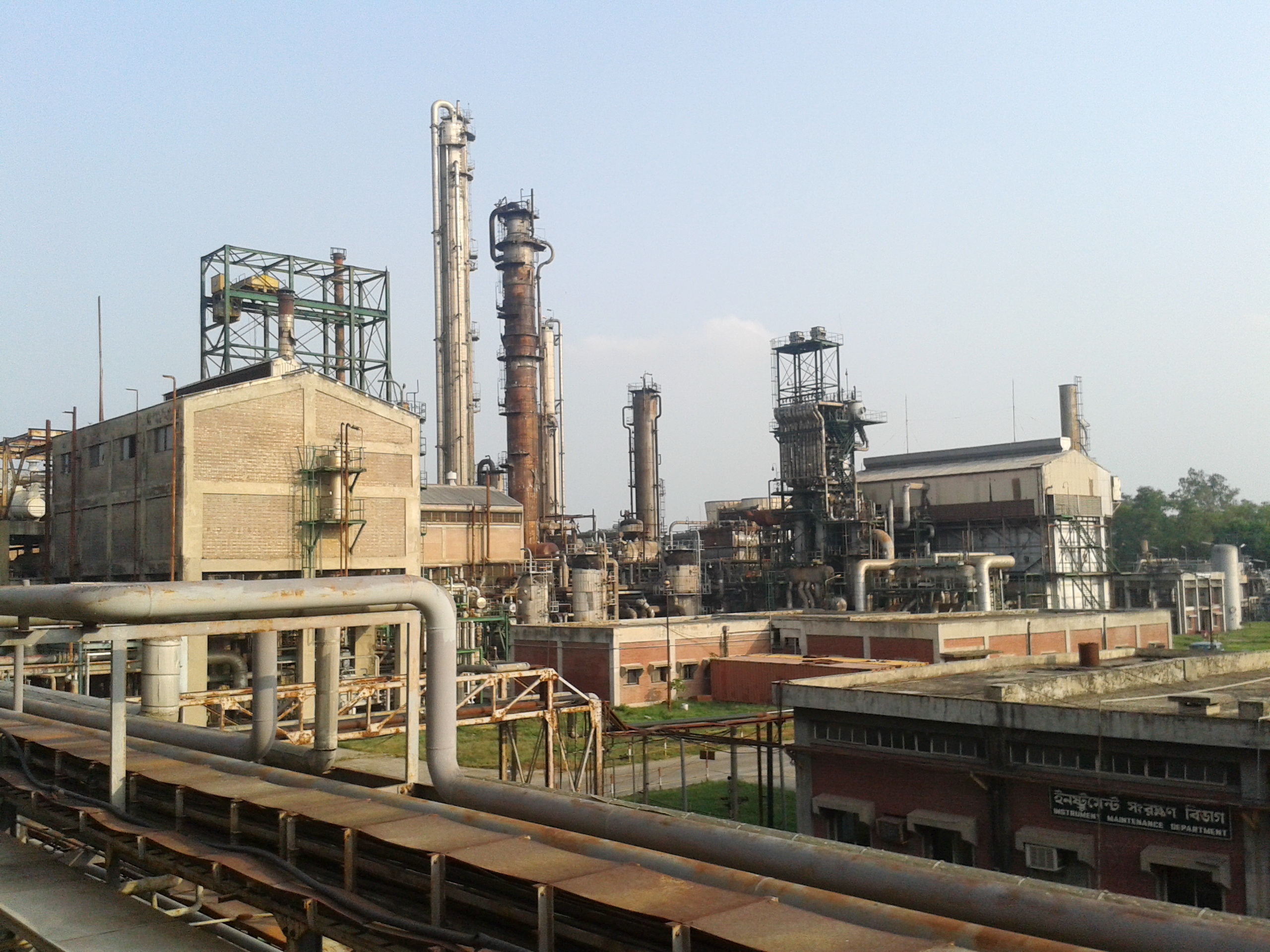
A plant in Bangladesh that produces urea fertilizer

More than 90% of world industrial production of urea is for use as a nitrogen-release fertilizer. Urea has the highest nitrogen content of all solid nitrogenous fertilizers in common use. Therefore, it has a low transportation cost per unit of nitrogen nutrient. Urea breaks down in the soil to give ammonium ions (NH^{+}_{4}). The ammonium is taken up by the plant through its roots. In some soils, the ammonium is oxidized by bacteria to give nitrate (NO^{−}_{3}), which is also a nitrogen-rich plant nutrient. The loss of nitrogenous compounds to the atmosphere and runoff is wasteful and environmentally damaging so urea is sometimes modified to enhance the efficiency of its agricultural use. Techniques to make controlled-release fertilizers that slow the release of nitrogen include the encapsulation of urea in an inert sealant, and conversion of urea into derivatives such as urea-formaldehyde compounds, which degrade into ammonia at a pace matching plants' nutritional requirements. The most common impurity of synthetic urea is biuret, which impairs plant growth.

=== Resins ===
Urea is a raw material for the manufacture of formaldehyde based resins, such as UF, MUF, and MUPF, used mainly in wood-based panels, for instance, particleboard, fiberboard, OSB, and plywood.

=== Explosives ===
Urea can be used in a reaction with nitric acid to make urea nitrate, a high explosive that is used industrially and as part of some improvised explosive devices.

=== Automobile systems ===
Urea is used in Selective Non-Catalytic Reduction (SNCR) and Selective Catalytic Reduction (SCR) reactions to reduce the NO_{x} pollutants in exhaust gases from diesel, dual fuel, and lean-burn natural gas engines. The BlueTec system, for example, injects a water-based urea solution into the exhaust system. Ammonia (NH_{3}) produced by the hydrolysis of urea reacts with nitrogen oxides (NO_{x}) and is converted into nitrogen gas (N_{2}) and water within the catalytic converter. The conversion of noxious NO_{x} to innocuous N_{2} is described by the following simplified global equation:

4 NO + 4 NH_{3} + O_{2} → 4 N_{2} + 6 H_{2}O

When urea is used, a pre-reaction (hydrolysis) occurs to first convert it to ammonia:

CO(NH_{2})_{2} + H_{2}O → 2 NH_{3} + CO_{2}

Being a solid highly soluble in water (1200 g/L at 25 °C (77 °F)), urea is much easier and safer to handle and store than the more irritant, caustic and hazardous ammonia, so it is the reactant of choice. Trucks and cars using these catalytic converters need to carry a supply of diesel exhaust fluid, also sold as AdBlue, a solution of urea in water.

=== Laboratory uses ===
Urea in concentrations up to 10 M is a protein denaturant as it disrupts the noncovalent bonds in the proteins. This property can be exploited to increase the solubility of some proteins. A mixture of urea and choline chloride is used as a deep eutectic solvent (DES), a substance similar to ionic liquid. When used in a deep eutectic solvent, urea gradually denatures the proteins that are solubilized.

Urea in concentrations up to 8 M can be used to make fixed brain tissue transparent to visible light while still preserving fluorescent signals from labeled cells. This allows for much deeper imaging of neuronal processes than previously obtainable using conventional one photon or two photon confocal microscopes.

=== Medical use ===
Urea-containing creams are used as topical dermatological products to promote rehydration of the skin. Urea 40% is indicated for psoriasis, xerosis, onychomycosis, ichthyosis, eczema, keratosis, keratoderma, corns, and calluses. If covered by an occlusive dressing, 40% urea preparations may also be used for nonsurgical debridement of nails. Urea 40% "dissolves the intercellular matrix" of the nail plate. Only diseased or dystrophic nails are removed, as there is no effect on healthy portions of the nail.

Urea has been studied as a diuretic. It was first used by Dr. W. Friedrich in 1892. In a 2010 study of ICU patients, urea was used to treat euvolemic hyponatremia and was found safe, inexpensive, and simple.

Like saline, urea has been injected into the uterus to induce abortion, although this method is no longer in widespread use.

The blood urea nitrogen (BUN) test is a measure of the amount of nitrogen in the blood that comes from urea. It is used as a marker of renal function, though it is inferior to other markers such as creatinine because blood urea levels are influenced by other factors such as diet, dehydration, and liver function.

Urea has also been studied as an excipient in drug-coated balloon (DCB) coating formulations to enhance local drug delivery to stenotic blood vessels. Urea, when used as an excipient in small doses (~3 μg/mm^{2}) to coat DCB surface was found to form crystals that increase drug transfer without adverse toxic effects on vascular endothelial cells.

Urea labeled with carbon-14 or carbon-13 is used in the urea breath test, which is used to detect the presence of the bacterium Helicobacter pylori (H. pylori) in the stomach and duodenum of humans, associated with peptic ulcers. The test detects the characteristic enzyme urease, produced by H. pylori, by a reaction that produces ammonia from urea. This increases the pH (reduces the acidity) of the stomach environment around the bacteria. Similar bacteria species to H. pylori can be identified by the same test in animals such as apes, dogs, and cats (including big cats).

=== Miscellaneous ===
- An ingredient in diesel exhaust fluid (DEF), which is 32.5% urea and 67.5% de-ionized water. DEF is sprayed into the exhaust stream of diesel vehicles to break down dangerous NO_{x} emissions into harmless nitrogen and water.
- A component of animal feed, providing a relatively cheap source of non-protein nitrogen to promote growth.
- A non-corroding alternative to rock salt for road de-icing. It is often the main ingredient of pet friendly salt substitutes although it is less effective than traditional rock salt or calcium chloride.
- A main ingredient in hair removers such as Nair and Veet.
- A browning agent in factory-produced pretzels.
- An ingredient in some skin cream, moisturizers, hair conditioners, and shampoos.
- A cloud seeding agent, along with other salts.
- A flame-proofing agent, commonly used in dry chemical fire extinguisher charges such as the urea-potassium bicarbonate mixture.
- Along with diammonium phosphate, as a yeast nutrient, for fermentation of sugars into ethanol.
- A nutrient used by plankton in ocean nourishment experiments for climate engineering purposes.
- As an additive to extend the working temperature and open time of hide glue.
- As a solubility-enhancing and moisture-retaining additive to dye baths for textile dyeing or printing.
- As an optical parametric oscillator in nonlinear optics.
- To help prepare an alpine skiing course by hardening the snow into a icier surface to maintain the integrity of the course.

== Physiology ==
Amino acids, e.g. from ingested food, can be oxidized by the body as an alternative source of energy, yielding urea and carbon dioxide. The oxidation pathway starts with the removal of the amino group by a transaminase; the amino group is then fed into the urea cycle. The first step in the conversion of amino acids into metabolic waste in the liver is removal of the alpha-amino nitrogen, which produces ammonia. Because ammonia is toxic, it is excreted immediately by fish, converted into uric acid by birds, and converted into urea by mammals.

Ammonia (NH_{3}) is a common byproduct of the metabolism of nitrogenous compounds. Ammonia is smaller, more volatile, and more mobile than urea. If allowed to accumulate, ammonia would raise the pH in cells to toxic levels. Therefore, many organisms convert ammonia to urea, even though this synthesis has a net energy cost. Being practically neutral and highly soluble in water, urea is a safe vehicle for the body to transport and excrete excess nitrogen.

Urea is synthesized in the body of many organisms as part of the urea cycle, either from the oxidation of amino acids or from ammonia. In this cycle, amino groups donated by ammonia and L-aspartate are converted to urea, while L-ornithine, citrulline, L-argininosuccinate, and L-arginine act as intermediates. Urea production occurs in the liver and is regulated by N-acetylglutamate. Urea is then dissolved into the blood (in the reference range of 2.5 to 6.7 mmol/L) and further transported and excreted by the kidney as a component of urine. In addition, a small amount of urea is excreted (along with sodium chloride and water) in sweat.

In water, the amine groups undergo slow displacement by water molecules, producing ammonia, ammonium ions, and bicarbonate ions. For this reason, old, stale urine has a stronger odor than fresh urine.

=== Humans ===
The cycling of and excretion of urea by the kidneys is a vital part of mammalian metabolism. Besides its role as carrier of waste nitrogen, urea also plays a role in the countercurrent exchange system of the nephrons, that allows for reabsorption of water and critical ions from the excreted urine. Urea is reabsorbed in the inner medullary collecting ducts of the nephrons, thus raising the osmolarity in the medullary interstitium surrounding the thin descending limb of the loop of Henle, which makes the water reabsorb.

By action of the urea transporter 2, some of this reabsorbed urea eventually flows back into the thin descending limb of the tubule, through the collecting ducts, and into the excreted urine. The body uses this mechanism, which is controlled by the antidiuretic hormone, to create hyperosmotic urine—i.e., urine with a higher concentration of dissolved substances than the blood plasma. This mechanism is important to prevent the loss of water, maintain blood pressure, and maintain a suitable concentration of sodium ions in the blood plasma.

The equivalent nitrogen content (in grams) of urea (in mmol) can be estimated by the conversion factor 0.028 g/mmol. Furthermore, 1 gram of nitrogen is roughly equivalent to 6.25 grams of protein, and 1 gram of protein is roughly equivalent to 5 grams of muscle tissue. In situations such as muscle wasting, 1 mmol of excessive urea in the urine (as measured by urine volume in litres multiplied by urea concentration in mmol/L) roughly corresponds to a muscle loss of 0.67 grams.

=== Other species ===
In aquatic organisms the most common form of nitrogen waste is ammonia, whereas land-dwelling organisms convert the toxic ammonia to either urea or uric acid. Urea is found in the urine of mammals and amphibians, as well as some fish. Birds and saurian reptiles have a different form of nitrogen metabolism that requires less water, and leads to nitrogen excretion in the form of uric acid. Tadpoles excrete ammonia, but shift to urea production during metamorphosis. Despite the generalization above, the urea pathway has been documented not only in mammals and amphibians, but in many other organisms as well, including birds, invertebrates, insects, plants, yeast, fungi, and even microorganisms.

== Adverse effects ==
Urea can be irritating to skin, eyes, and the respiratory tract. Repeated or prolonged contact with urea in fertilizer form on the skin may cause dermatitis.

High concentrations in the blood can be damaging. Ingestion of low concentrations of urea, such as are found in typical human urine, are not dangerous with additional water ingestion within a reasonable time-frame. Many animals (e.g. camels, rodents or dogs) have a much more concentrated urine which may contain a higher urea amount than normal human urine.

Urea can cause algal blooms to produce toxins, and its presence in the runoff from fertilized land may play a role in the increase of toxic blooms.

The substance decomposes on heating above melting point, producing toxic gases, and reacts violently with strong oxidants, nitrites, inorganic chlorides, chlorites and perchlorates, causing fire and explosion.

== History ==
Urea was first obtained by Herman Boerhaave in 1727 from evaporates of urine. The discovery is also attributed to the French chemist Hilaire Rouelle as well as William Cruickshank. In 1773, Hilaire Rouelle obtained crystals containing urea by evaporating human urine and treating the concentrate with alcohol. This method was aided by Carl Wilhelm Scheele's discovery that crystals precipitated when urine was treated by concentrated nitric acid.

Uremic frost was first described in 1856 by the Austrian physician Anton Drasche. Uremic frost has become rare since the advent of dialysis. It is the classical pre-dialysis era description of crystallized urea deposits over the skin of patients with prolonged kidney failure and severe uremia.

=== Historical preparation ===
Antoine François, comte de Fourcroy and Louis Nicolas Vauquelin discovered in 1799 that the nitrated crystals were identical to Rouelle's substance and invented the term "urea."

Berzelius further improved the purification of urea. In 1817 William Prout determining the chemical composition. In the evolved procedure, urea was precipitated as urea nitrate by adding strong nitric acid to urine. To purify the resulting crystals, they were dissolved in boiling water with charcoal and filtered. After cooling, pure crystals of urea nitrate form. To reconstitute the urea from the nitrate, the crystals are dissolved in warm water, and barium carbonate added. The water is then evaporated and anhydrous alcohol added to extract the urea. This solution is drained off and evaporated, leaving pure urea.

=== Wöhler's experiments ===
In 1828, the German chemist Friedrich Wöhler prepared urea by treating silver cyanate with ammonium chloride.

AgNCO + [NH_{4}]Cl → CO(NH_{2})_{2} + AgCl

This was one of the first artificial syntheses of biological compounds from inorganic starting materials, without the involvement of living organisms. The results of this experiment implicitly discredited vitalism, the theory that the chemicals of living organisms are fundamentally different from those of inanimate matter. This insight was important for the development of organic chemistry. His discovery prompted Wöhler to write triumphantly to Jöns Jakob Berzelius:

I must tell you that I can make urea without the use of kidneys, either man or dog. Ammonium cyanate is urea.

His second sentence was incorrect. Ammonium cyanate [NH_{4}]^{+}[OCN]^{−} and urea CO(NH_{2})_{2} are two different chemicals with the same empirical formula CON_{2}H_{4}, which are in chemical equilibrium heavily favoring urea under standard conditions.

== Laboratory preparation ==
Urea can be produced by heating ammonium cyanate to 60 °C (140 °F).

[NH_{4}]^{+}[OCN]^{−} → (NH_{2})_{2}CO

== Industrial production ==
In 2020, worldwide production capacity was approximately 180 million tonnes.

For use in industry, urea is produced from synthetic ammonia and carbon dioxide. As large quantities of carbon dioxide are produced during the ammonia manufacturing process as a byproduct of burning hydrocarbons to generate heat (predominantly natural gas, and less often petroleum derivatives or coal), urea production plants are almost always located adjacent to the site where the ammonia is manufactured.

=== Synthesis ===
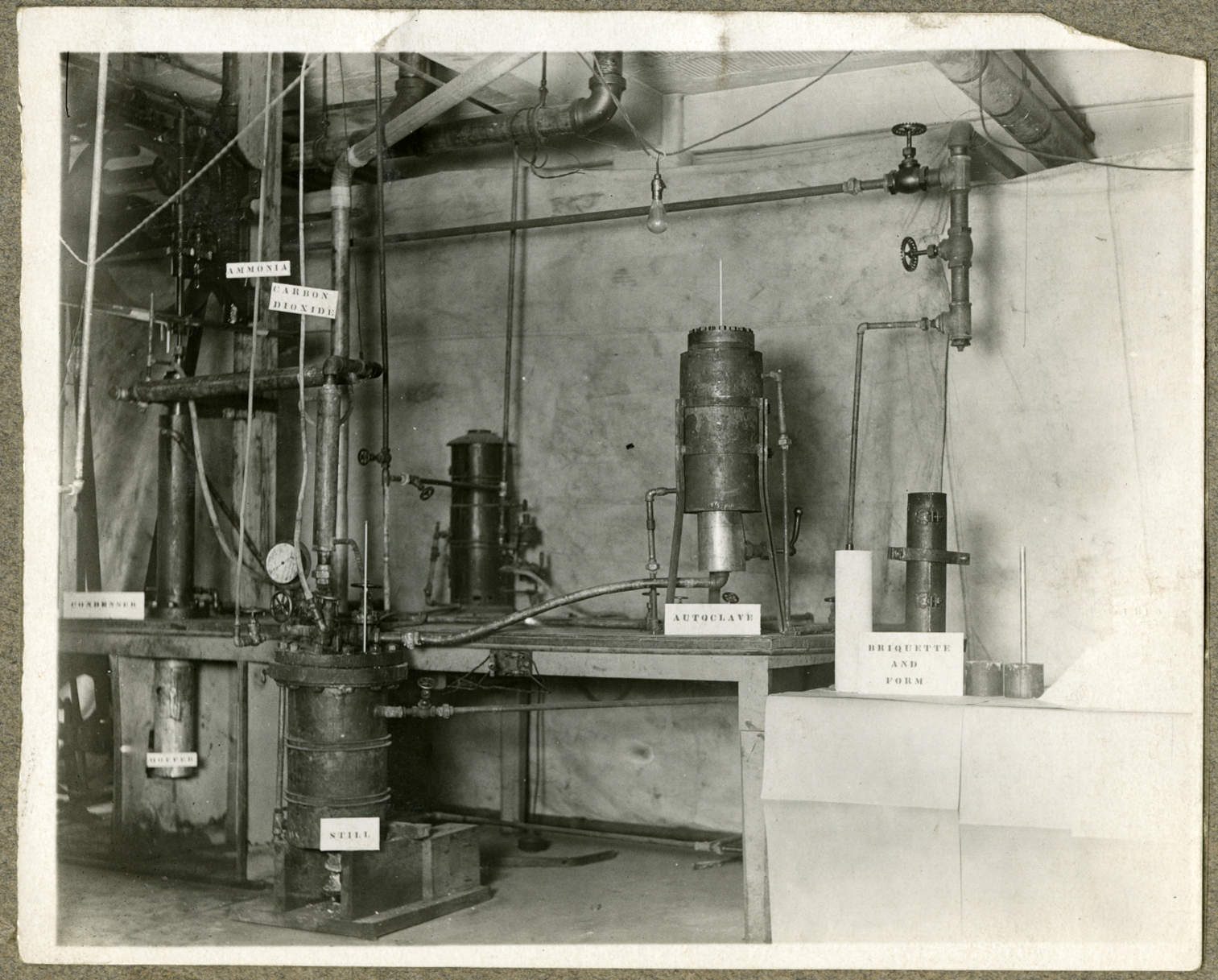
Urea plant using ammonium carbamate briquettes, Fixed Nitrogen Research Laboratory, ca. 1930

The basic process, patented in 1922, is called the Bosch–Meiser urea process after its discoverers Carl Bosch and Wilhelm Meiser. The process consists of two main equilibrium reactions, with incomplete conversion of the reactants. The first is carbamate formation: the fast exothermic reaction of liquid ammonia with gaseous carbon dioxide (CO_{2}) at high temperature and pressure to form ammonium carbamate ([NH_{4}]^{+}[NH_{2}COO]^{−}):

2 NH_{3} + CO_{2} ⇌ NH_{4}CO_{2}NH_{2} (ΔH = −117 kJ/mol at 110 atm (11 MPa) and 160 °C (320 °F))

The second is urea conversion: the slower endothermic decomposition of ammonium carbamate into urea and water:

NH_{4}CO_{2}NH_{2} ⇌ CO(NH_{2})_{2} + H_{2}O (ΔH = 15.5 kJ/mol at 160–180 °C (320–356 °F))

The overall conversion of NH_{3} and CO_{2} to urea is exothermic, with the reaction heat from the first reaction driving the second. The conditions that favor urea formation (high temperature) have an unfavorable effect on the carbamate formation equilibrium. The process conditions are a compromise: the ill-effect on the first reaction of the high temperature (around 190 °C (374 °F)) needed for the second is compensated for by conducting the process under high pressure (1.4–1.75 MPa (203–254 psi)), which favors the first reaction. Although it is necessary to compress gaseous carbon dioxide to this pressure, the ammonia is available from the ammonia production plant in liquid form, which can be pumped into the system much more economically. To allow the slow urea formation reaction time to reach equilibrium, a large reaction space is needed, so the synthesis reactor in a large urea plant tends to be a massive pressure vessel.

=== Reactant recycling ===
Because the urea conversion is incomplete, the urea must be separated from the unconverted reactants, including the ammonium carbamate. Various commercial urea processes are characterized by the conditions under which urea forms and the way that unconverted reactants are further processed.

==== Conventional recycle processes ====
In early "straight-through" urea plants, reactant recovery (the first step in recycling) was done by letting down the system pressure to atmospheric to let the carbamate decompose back to ammonia and carbon dioxide. Originally, because it was not economic to recompress the ammonia and carbon dioxide for recycle, the ammonia at least would be used for the manufacture of other products such as ammonium nitrate or ammonium sulfate, and the carbon dioxide was usually wasted. Later process schemes made recycling unused ammonia and carbon dioxide practical. This was accomplished by the "total recycle process", developed in the 1940s to 1960s and now called the conventional recycle process. It proceeds by depressurizing the reaction solution in stages (first to 1.8–2.5 MPa (260–360 psi) and then to 0.2–0.5 MPa (29–73 psi)) and passing it at each stage through a steam-heated carbamate decomposer, then recombining the resulting carbon dioxide and ammonia in a falling-film carbamate condenser and pumping the carbamate solution back into the urea reaction vessel.

==== Stripping recycle process ====
The conventional recycle process for recovering and reusing the reactants has largely been supplanted by a stripping process, developed in the early 1960s by Stamicarbon in The Netherlands, that operates at or near the full pressure of the reaction vessel. It reduces the complexity of the multi-stage recycle scheme, and it reduces the amount of water recycled in the carbamate solution, which has an adverse effect on the equilibrium in the urea conversion reaction and thus on overall plant efficiency. Effectively all new urea plants use the stripper, and many total recycle urea plants have converted to a stripping process.

In the conventional recycle processes, carbamate decomposition is promoted by reducing the overall pressure, which reduces the partial pressure of both ammonia and carbon dioxide, allowing these gasses to be separated from the urea product solution. The stripping process achieves a similar effect without lowering the overall pressure, by suppressing the partial pressure of just one of the reactants in order to promote carbamate decomposition. Instead of feeding carbon dioxide gas directly to the urea synthesis reactor with the ammonia, as in the conventional process, the stripping process first routes the carbon dioxide through the stripper. The stripper is a carbamate decomposer that provides a large amount of gas-liquid contact. This flushes out free ammonia, reducing its partial pressure over the liquid surface and carrying it directly to a carbamate condenser (also under full system pressure). From there, reconstituted ammonium carbamate liquor is passed to the urea production reactor. That eliminates the medium-pressure stage of the conventional recycle process.

=== Side reactions ===
The three main side reactions that produce impurities have in common that they decompose urea.

Urea hydrolyzes back to ammonium carbamate in the hottest stages of the synthesis plant, especially in the stripper, so residence times in these stages are designed to be short.

Biuret is formed when two molecules of urea combine with the loss of a molecule of ammonia.

2 NH_{2}CONH_{2} → NH_{2}CONHCONH_{2} + NH_{3}

Normally this reaction is suppressed in the synthesis reactor by maintaining an excess of ammonia, but after the stripper, it occurs until the temperature is reduced. Biuret is undesirable in urea fertilizer because it is toxic to crop plants to varying degrees, but it is sometimes desirable as a nitrogen source when used in animal feed.

Isocyanic acid HNCO and ammonia NH_{3} results from the thermal decomposition of ammonium cyanate [NH_{4}]^{+}[OCN]^{−}, which is in chemical equilibrium with urea:

CO(NH_{2})_{2} → [NH_{4}]^{+}[OCN]^{−} → HNCO + NH_{3}

This decomposition is at its worst when the urea solution is heated at low pressure, which happens when the solution is concentrated for prilling or granulation (see below). The reaction products mostly volatilize into the overhead vapours, and recombine when these condense to form urea again, which contaminates the process condensate.

=== Corrosion ===
Ammonium carbamate solutions are highly corrosive to metallic construction materials – even to resistant forms of stainless steel – especially in the hottest parts of the synthesis plant such as the stripper. Historically corrosion has been minimized (although not eliminated) by continuous injection of a small amount of oxygen (as air) into the plant to establish and maintain a passive oxide layer on exposed stainless steel surfaces. Highly corrosion resistant materials have been introduced to reduce the need for passivation oxygen, such as specialized duplex stainless steels in the 1990s, and zirconium or zirconium-clad titanium tubing in the 2000s.

=== Finishing ===
Urea can be produced in solid forms (prills, granules, pellets or crystals) or as solutions.

==== Solid forms ====
For its main use as a fertilizer urea is mostly marketed in solid form, either as prills or granules. Prills are solidified droplets, whose production predates satisfactory urea granulation processes. Prills can be produced more cheaply than granules, but the limited size of prills (up to about 2.1 mm (0.083 in) in diameter), their low crushing strength, and the caking or crushing of prills during bulk storage and handling make them inferior to granules. Granules are produced by accretion onto urea seed particles by spraying liquid urea in a succession of layers. Formaldehyde is added during the production of both prills and granules in order to increase crushing strength and suppress caking. Other shaping techniques such as pastillization (depositing uniform-sized liquid droplets onto a cooling conveyor belt) are also used.

==== Liquid forms ====
Solutions of urea and ammonium nitrate in water (UAN) are commonly used as a liquid fertilizer. In admixture, the combined solubility of ammonium nitrate and urea is so much higher than that of either component alone that it gives a stable solution with a total nitrogen content (32%) approaching that of solid ammonium nitrate (33.5%), though not, of course, that of urea itself (46%). UAN allows use of ammonium nitrate without the explosion hazard. UAN accounts for 80% of the liquid fertilizers in the US.

== See also ==
- Wöhler urea synthesis
- Thiourea
