= New fuchsine =

Names
- Other names New fuchsin; Magenta III; Basic Violet 2; C.I. 42520

Identifiers
CAS Number	3248-91-7
3D model (JSmol)	Interactive image
ChEBI	CHEBI:87671
ChEMBL	ChEMBL1979779
ChemSpider	17578
ECHA InfoCard	100.019.847
EC Number	221-831-7
PubChem CID	18611
UNII	A051F48W36 base
CompTox Dashboard (EPA)	DTXSID80879817
- InChI: InChI=1S/C22H23N3.ClH/c1-13-10-16(4-7-19(13)23)22(17-5-8-20(24)14(2)11-17)18-6-9-21(25)15(3)12-18;/h4-12,23H,24-25H2,1-3H3;1H Key: IPSIPYMEZZPCPY-UHFFFAOYSA-N
- SMILES: CC1=CC(=C(C2=CC(=C(C=C2)N)C)C3=CC(=C(C=C3)N)C)C=CC1=[NH2+].[Cl-]

Properties
Chemical formula	C_{22}H_{24}ClN_{3}
Molar mass	365.91 g·mol^{−1}
Appearance	violet powder

Hazards
- GHS labelling
Pictograms	(GHS05: Corrosive) (GHS07: Exclamation mark) (GHS08: Health hazard) (GHS09: Environmental hazard)
Signal word	Danger
Hazard statements	H315, H318, H319, H335, H350, H351, H373, H410
Precautionary statements	P201, P202, P260, P264, P271, P273, P280, P281, P302+P352, P304+P340, P305+P351+P338, P308+P313, P310, P312, P314, P321, P332+P313, P337+P313, P362, P391, P403+P233, P405, P501
- Except where otherwise noted, data are given for materials in their standard state (at 25 °C [77 °F], 100 kPa). Infobox references

New fuchsine is an organic compound with the formula [(H_{2}N(CH_{3})C_{6}H_{3})_{3}C]Cl. It is a green-colored solid that is used as a dye of the triarylmethane class. It is one of the four components of basic fuchsine, and one of the two that are available as single dyes. The other is pararosaniline. It is prepared by condensation of ortho-toluidine with formaldehyde. This process initially gives the benzhydrol 4,4'-bis(dimethylamino)benzhydrol, which is further condensed to give the leuco (colorless) tertiary alcohol [(H_{2}N(CH_{3})C_{6}H_{3})_{3}COH, which is oxidized in acid to give the dye.

== Use as dye and stain ==
New fuchsine is used to dye polyacrylonitrile, paper, and leather. In biology, it can be used for staining acid-fast organisms, e.g. by Ziehl–Neelsen stain, and for making Schiff's reagent. As a primary amine, the dye can be diazotized in the laboratory, and the resulting diazonium salt used as a trapping agent in enzyme histochemistry.

== Etymology ==
The name fuchsine recognizes Leonhart Fuchs.

== See also ==
- Fuchsine
- Pararosaniline
