= Fuchsia (color) =

Color

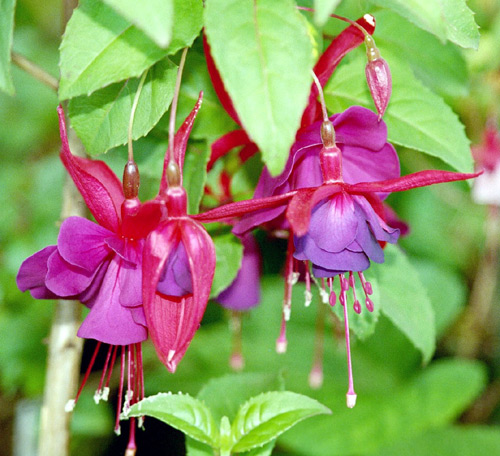
- Flowers of the fuchsia plant

Color coordinates
- Hex triplet: #FF00FF
- sRGB^{B} (r, g, b): (255, 0, 255)
- HSV (h, s, v): (300°, 100%, 100%)
- CIELCh_{uv} (L, C, h): (60, 137, 308°)
- Source: W3C CSS Color Module
- B: Normalized to [0–255] (byte)

Fuchsia (/ˈfjuːʃə/, FEW-shə) is a vivid pinkish–red color, named after the color of the flower of the fuchsia plant, which was named by a French botanist, Charles Plumier, after the 16th-century German botanist Leonhart Fuchs.

The color fuchsia was introduced as the color of a new aniline dye called fuchsine, patented in 1859 by the French chemist François-Emmanuel Verguin. The fuchsine dye was renamed magenta later in the same year, to celebrate a victory of the French army at the Battle of Magenta on 4 June 1859 near the Italian city of that name.

The first recorded use of fuchsia as a color name in English was in 1892.

== In print and design ==
In color printing and design, there are more variations between magenta and fuchsia. Fuchsia is usually a more pinkish–purplish color, whereas magenta is more reddish. Fuchsia flowers themselves contain a wide variety of purples. Fuchsia was a very popular aesthetic for fashion during the 2000s.

== Fuchsine ==
The first synthetic dye of the color fuchsia, called fuchsine, was patented in 1859 by François-Emmanuel Verguin. It was later renamed magenta, and became highly popular under that name.

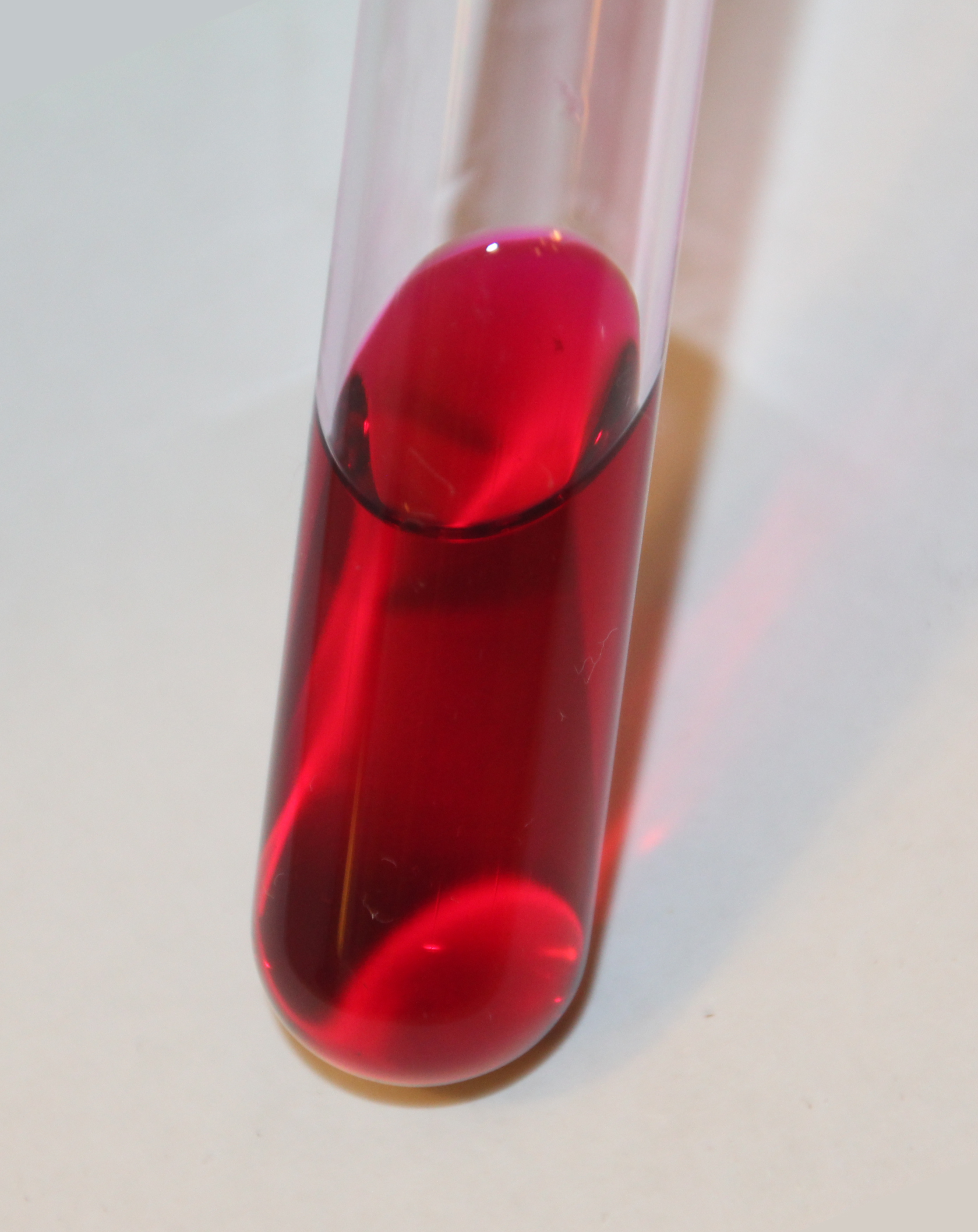
A sample of fuchsine dye in an aqueous solution

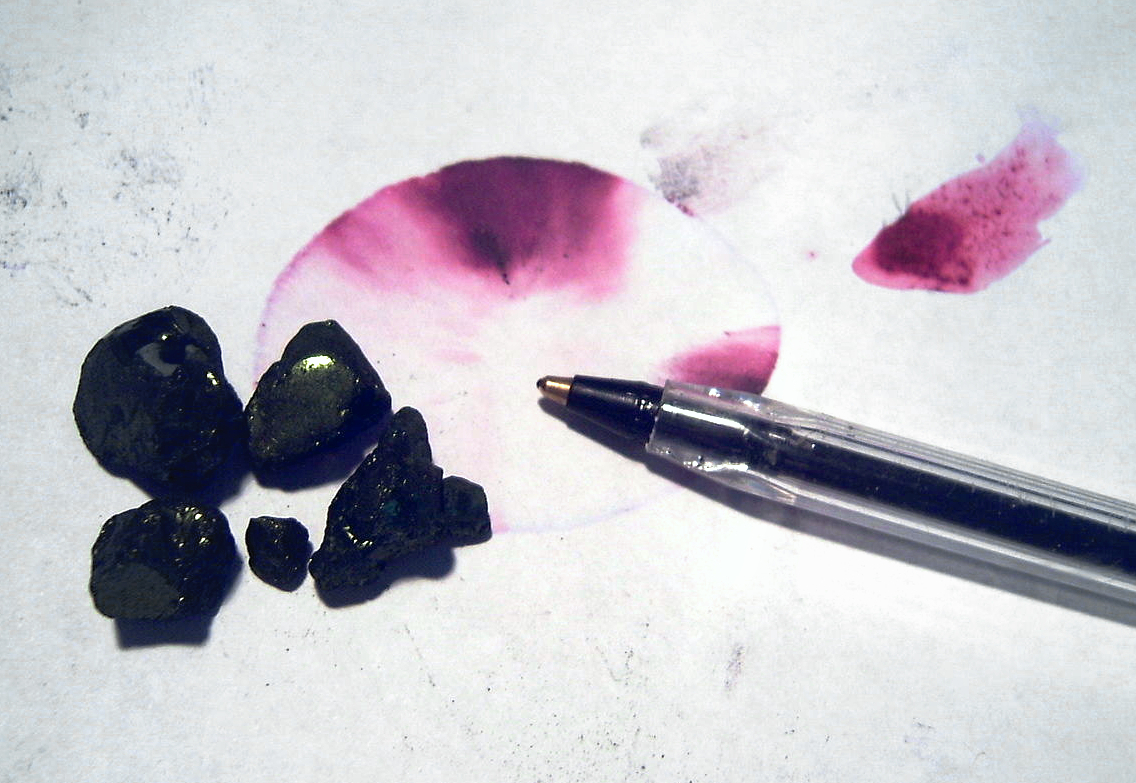
Crystals of fuchsine dye and the color they produce

== Fuchsia (web color) ==
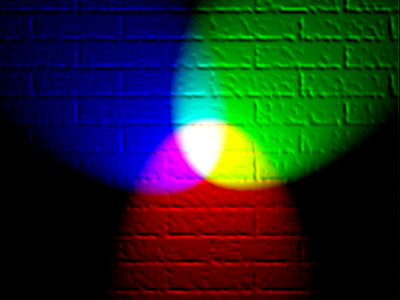
On computer screens, red and blue light combined at full intensity produce fuchsia or magenta. The two web colors are identical, and have the same hex code, FF00FF.

Fuchsia (web color)

Color coordinates
- Hex triplet: #FF00FF
- sRGB^{B} (r, g, b): (255, 0, 255)
- HSV (h, s, v): (300°, 100%, 100%)
- CIELCh_{uv} (L, C, h): (60, 137, 308°)
- Source: HTML/CSS
- ISCC–NBS descriptor: Vivid purple
- B: Normalized to [0–255] (byte); H: Normalized to [0–100] (hundred)

In the system of additive colors, the RGB color model used to create all the colors on a computer or television display, the colors magenta and fuchsia are exactly the same, and have the same hex number, #FF00FF. The name fuchsia is used on the HTML web color list for this color, while the name magenta is used on the X11 web color list. They are both composed the same way, by combining an equal amount of blue and red light at full brightness, as shown in the image on the left.

== Variations of fuchsia ==
=== French fuchsia ===
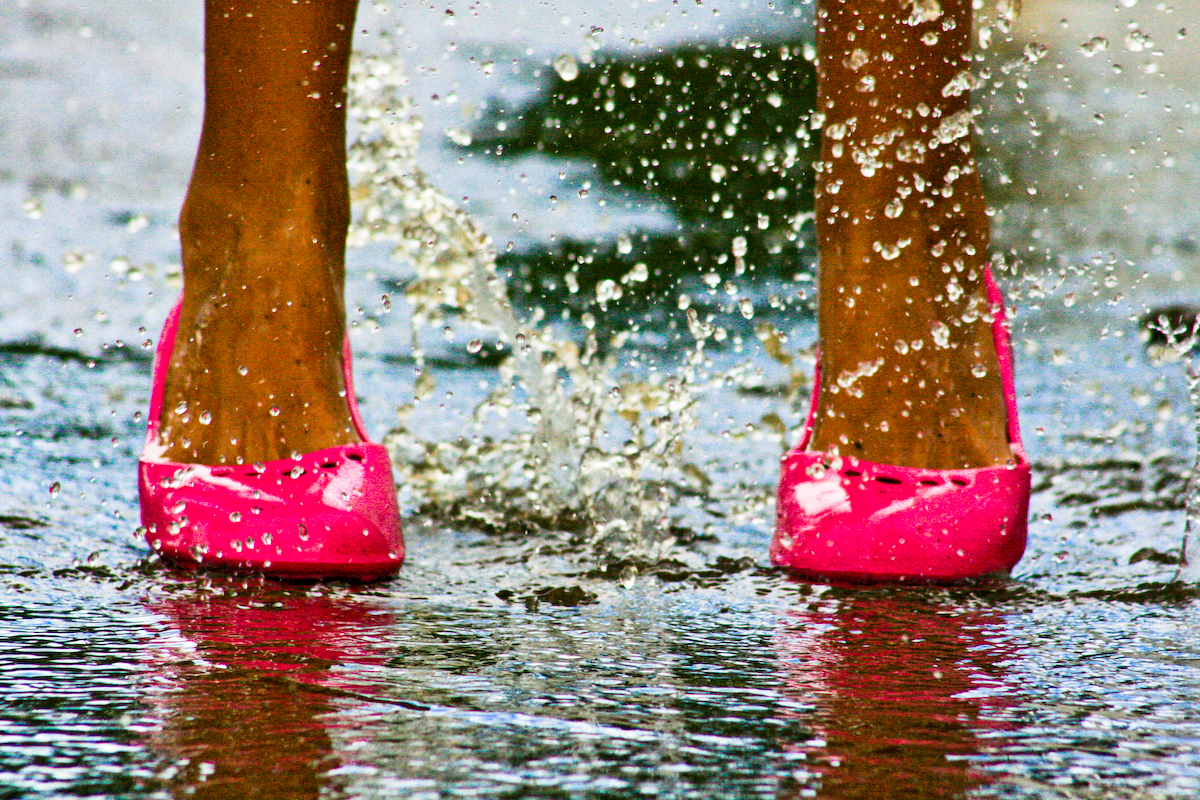
French fuchsia color shoes

French Fuchsia

Color coordinates
- Hex triplet: #FD3F92
- sRGB^{B} (r, g, b): (253, 63, 146)
- HSV (h, s, v): (334°, 75%, 99%)
- CIELCh_{uv} (L, C, h): (59, 121, 352°)
- Source: Pourpre.com
- ISCC–NBS descriptor: Vivid purplish red
- B: Normalized to [0–255] (byte)

At right is displayed the color French fuchsia, which is the tone of fuchsia called fuchsia in a color list popular in France.

=== Fuchsia rose ===
Fuchsia Rose

Color coordinates
- Hex triplet: #C74375
- sRGB^{B} (r, g, b): (199, 67, 117)
- HSV (h, s, v): (337°, 66%, 78%)
- CIELCh_{uv} (L, C, h): (49, 86, 354°)
- Source: Pantone TPX
- ISCC–NBS descriptor: Strong purplish red
- B: Normalized to [0–255] (byte)

Fuchsia rose is the color that was chosen as the 2001 Pantone color of the year by Pantone.

=== Red–purple ===
Red-Purple

Color coordinates
- Hex triplet: #E40078
- sRGB^{B} (r, g, b): (228, 0, 120)
- HSV (h, s, v): (328°, 100%, 89%)
- CIELCh_{uv} (L, C, h): (49, 125, 353°)
- Source: Gallego and Sanz
- ISCC–NBS descriptor: Vivid purplish red
- B: Normalized to [0–255] (byte)

Red–purple is the color that is called Rojo-Púrpura (the Spanish word for "red–purple") in the Guía de coloraciones (Guide to colorations) by Rosa Gallego and Juan Carlos Sanz, a color dictionary published in 2005 that is widely popular in the Hispanophone realm.

Although red-purple is a seldom-used color name in English, in Spanish it is regarded one of the major tones of purple.

=== Fuchsia purple ===
Fuchsia Purple

Color coordinates
- Hex triplet: #CC397B
- sRGB^{B} (r, g, b): (204, 57, 123)
- HSV (h, s, v): (333°, 72%, 80%)
- CIELCh_{uv} (L, C, h): (49, 93, 350°)
- ISCC–NBS descriptor: Vivid purplish red
- B: Normalized to [0–255] (byte)

The color fuchsia purple is displayed at right.

The source of this color is the "Pantone Textile Paper eXtended (TPX)" color list, color #18-2436 TPX—Fuchsia Purple.

=== Deep fuchsia ===
Fuchsia (Crayola)

Color coordinates
- Hex triplet: #C154C1
- sRGB^{B} (r, g, b): (193, 84, 193)
- HSV (h, s, v): (300°, 56%, 76%)
- CIELCh_{uv} (L, C, h): (54, 82, 308°)
- Source: Crayola
- ISCC–NBS descriptor: Vivid purple
- B: Normalized to [0–255] (byte)

Deep fuchsia is the color that is called fuchsia in the List of Crayola crayon colors.

=== Fandango ===
Fandango

Color coordinates
- Hex triplet: #B53389
- sRGB^{B} (r, g, b): (181, 51, 137)
- HSV (h, s, v): (320°, 72%, 71%)
- CIELCh_{uv} (L, C, h): (44, 78, 333°)
- Source: Maerz and Paul
- ISCC–NBS descriptor: Vivid purplish red
- B: Normalized to [0–255] (byte)

Displayed at right is the color fandango.

The first recorded use of fandango as a color name in English was in 1925.

=== Antique fuchsia ===
Antique Fuchsia

Color coordinates
- Hex triplet: #915C83
- sRGB^{B} (r, g, b): (145, 92, 131)
- HSV (h, s, v): (316°, 37%, 57%)
- CIELCh_{uv} (L, C, h): (46, 36, 322°)
- Source: Plochere
- ISCC–NBS descriptor: Moderate reddish purple
- B: Normalized to [0–255] (byte)

Displayed at right is the color antique fuchsia.

The first recorded use of antique fuchsia as a color name in English was in 1928.

The source of this color is the plochere color system, a color system formulated in 1948 that is widely used by interior designers.

== Crayola color fuchsia ==
In 1949 the color names of Crayola crayons were reformed and became more scientific, more of the names of the colors of the crayons being based on the names of colors in the original 1930 edition of the Dictionary of Color and the color names of the Munsell color system. Crayola crayons set up a color naming system similar to that used in the Munsell color wheel, except that violet instead of purple was used as the secondary color on the color wheel between red and blue. The web color fuchsia is equivalent to the pure chroma on Munsell color wheel of the Munsell color system that is designated as "5RP" (reddish purple) i.e., a purple that is shaded toward red (the color we can achieve with computers is a much more saturated pure color wheel chroma hue than the original color chip shown on the Munsell color wheel diagram in the Munsell color system article). In 1972, a new Crayola crayon color was introduced called hot magenta which is the closest equivalent to the web color fuchsia in Crayola crayons. (See List of Crayola crayon colors.)

The color shown in the color box above is the color "fuchsia" in A Dictionary of Color. That is why the name fuchsia was chosen as the equivalent to one of the three secondary additive primary colors, electric magenta, because A Dictionary of Color was the primary reference on color names (besides the Munsell Book of Color) before the introduction of personal computers. The color shown above is somewhat brighter than most actual flowers of the fuchsia plant. The color shown as magenta in A Dictionary of Color is a somewhat different color from the color shown in that book as fuchsia—it is the original color magenta since called rich magenta or magenta (dye) (see the article on magenta for a color box displaying a sample of this original magenta).

== See also ==
- Hot pink
- Magenta
- List of colors
- Shades of magenta
