= Periodic acid–Schiff stain =

Histological staining method

Periodic acid

Periodic acid–Schiff (PAS) is a staining method used to detect polysaccharides (such as glycogen) and mucosubstances (such as glycoproteins, glycolipids and mucins) in tissues. The reaction of periodic acid oxidizes vicinal diols in these sugars, usually breaking up the bond between two adjacent carbons not involved in the glycosidic linkage or ring closure in the ring of monosaccharide units that are part of the long polysaccharides and creating a pair of aldehydes at the two free tips of each broken monosaccharide ring. The oxidation condition has to be sufficiently regulated so as to not further oxidize the aldehydes. These aldehydes then react with the Schiff reagent to give a purple-magenta color. A suitable basic stain is often used as a counterstain.

• PAS diastase stain (PAS-D) is PAS stain used in combination with diastase, an enzyme that breaks down glycogen.

• Alcian blue/periodic acid–Schiff (AB/PAS or AB-PAS) uses alcian blue before the PAS step.

== Uses ==
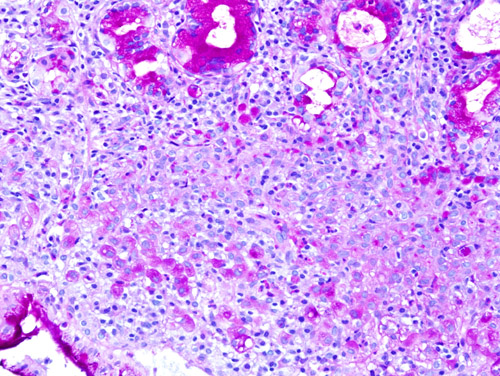
Gastric signet ring cell carcinoma histopathology, PAS stain

Micrograph of mucin on Periodic acid–Schiff (PAS) stain (magenta colored, annotated with red arrows) in a primary mucinous adenocarcinoma of the renal pelvis. A: PAS; B: PAS-D, that is, with diastase.

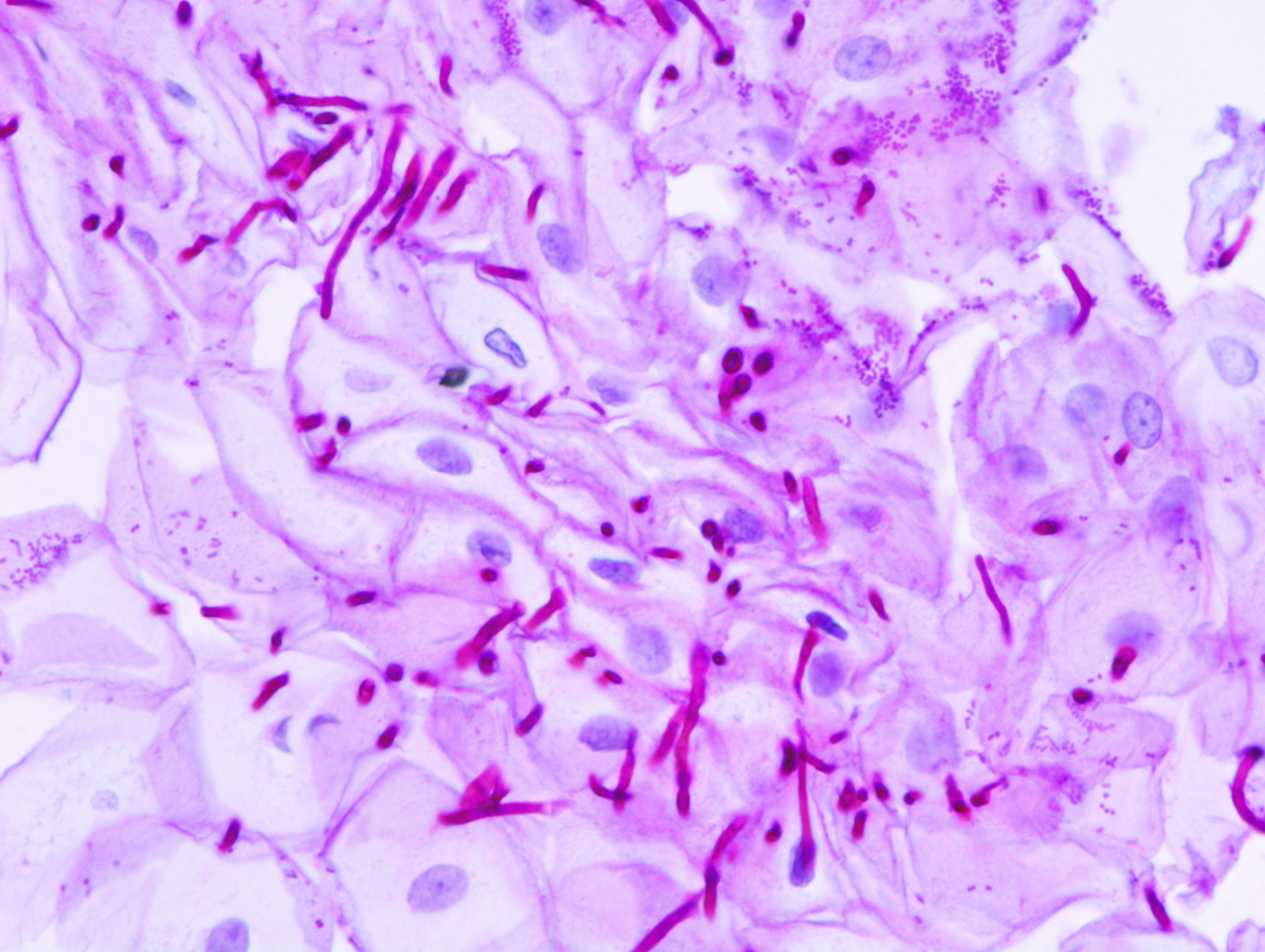
Esophageal candidiasis, PAS stain

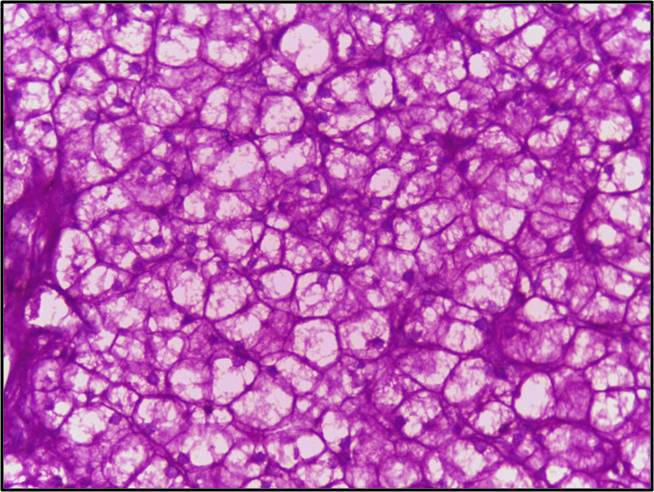
Liver in glycogen storage disease, PAS stain

PAS staining is mainly used for staining structures containing a high proportion of carbohydrate macromolecules (glycogen, glycoprotein, proteoglycans), typically found in e.g. connective tissues, mucus, the glycocalyx, and basal laminae.

PAS staining can be used to assist in the diagnosis of several medical conditions:

- Glycogen storage disease (versus other storage disorders).
- Adenocarcinomas, which often secrete neutral mucins.
- Paget disease of the breast.
- Alveolar soft part sarcoma.
- Staining macrophages in Whipple's disease.
- It can be used to diagnose α1-antitrypsin deficiency if periportal liver hepatocytes stain positive.
- Aggregates of PAS-positive lymphocytes are present in epidermis in Mycosis fungoides and Sézary syndrome, called Pautrier microabscesses.
- Ewing sarcoma
- Erythroleukemia, a leukemia of immature red blood cells. These cells stain a bright fuchsia.
- Pulmonary alveolar proteinosis.
- Fungal infection, the cell walls of fungi stain magenta; this only works on living fungi. In contrast, Grocott's methenamine silver stain (GMS) will stain both living and dead fungal organisms.
- It is used to identify glycogen in lung biopsy specimens of infants with pulmonary interstitial glycogenosis (PIG).
- It can be used to highlight super cross-linked lipids inclusions in ceroid lipofuscinosis (NCL).

Presence of glycogen can be confirmed on a section of tissue by using diastase to digest the glycogen from a section, then comparing a diastase digested PAS section with a normal PAS section. The diastase negative slide will show a magenta staining where glycogen is present within a section of tissue. The slide that has been treated with diastase will lack any positive PAS staining in those locations on the slide

PAS staining is also used for staining cellulose. One example would be looking for implanted medical devices composed of nonoxidized cellulose.

If the PAS stain will be performed on tissue, the recommended fixative is 10% neutral-buffered formalin or Bouin solution. For blood smears, the recommended fixative is methanol. Glutaraldehyde is not recommended because free aldehyde groups may be available to react with the Schiff reagent, which may result in false positive staining.

== See also ==
- Carboxyfluorescein
- DyLight Fluor, a product line of fluorescent dyes
- Egyptian blue
- Eosin
- Erythrosine
- Fluorescein
- Fluorescein amidite (FAM)
- Fluorescein diacetate hydrolysis, a biochemistry laboratory test
- Fluorescein isothiocyanate (FITC)
- Gentian violet
- Han purple
- Laser dyes
- Methyl blue
- Methyl violet
- Methylene blue
- New methylene blue
- Potassium ferricyanide
- Potassium ferrocyanide
- Prussian blue
- Rose bengal
