= Leonhart Fuchs =

German physician and botanist (1501–1566)

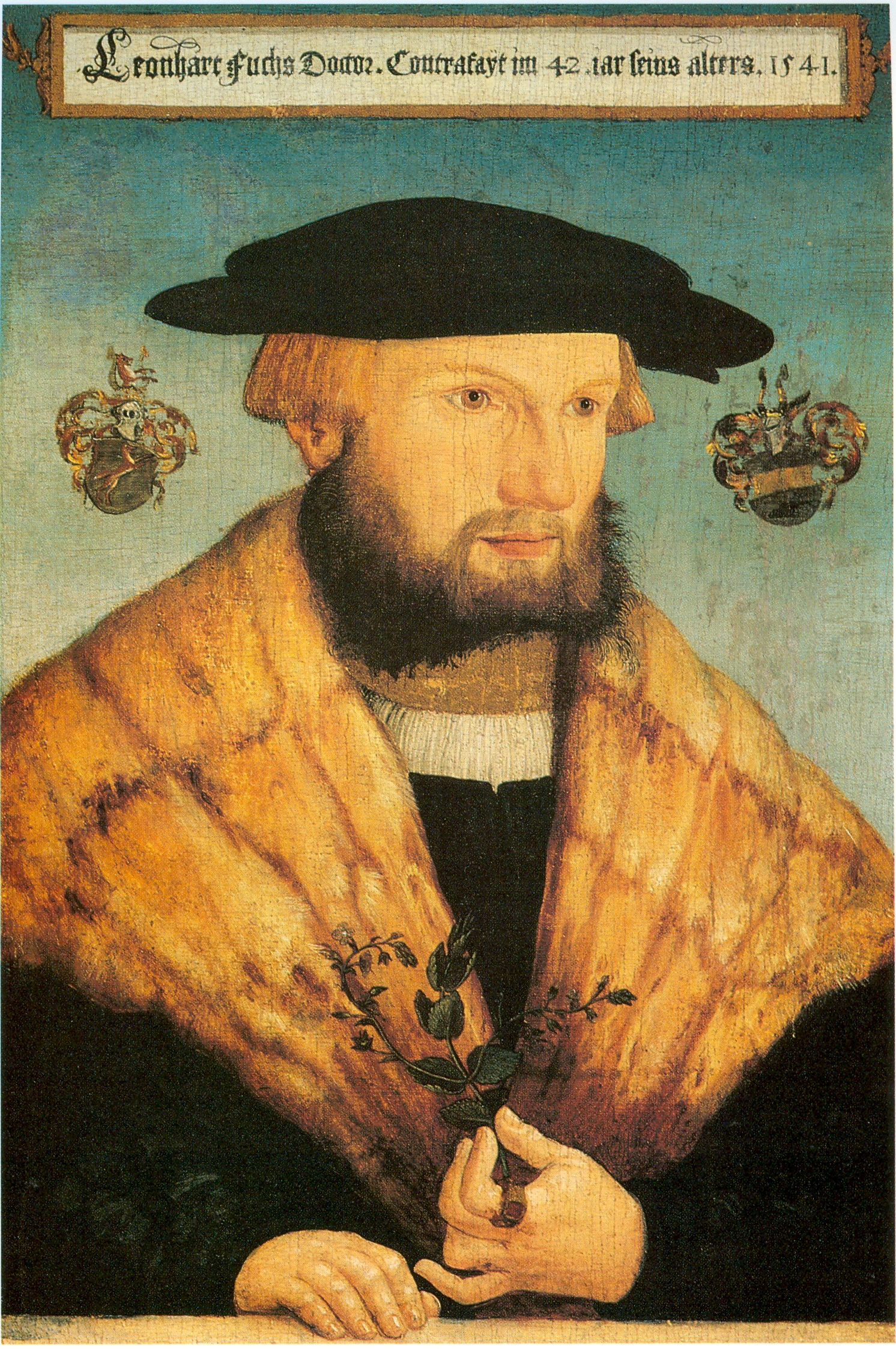
- Portrait by Heinrich Füllmaurer, Tübingen, 1541
- Born: 17 January 1501; Wemding, Duchy of Bavaria, Holy Roman Empire
- Died: 10 May 1566 (aged 65); Tübingen, Duchy of Württemberg, Holy Roman Empire
- Education: University of Erfurt; University of Ingolstadt (M.D., 1524)
- Scientific career
- Fields: Botany
- Workplaces: University of Tübingen
- Notable students: Johann Bauhin

Leonhart Fuchs (German: [ˈleːɔnhaʁt ˈfʊks]; 17 January 1501 – 10 May 1566), sometimes spelled Leonhard Fuchs (Note: For the alternative spelling Leonhard, see for example Sachs (1890, p. 13) and Vines (1913)) and cited in Latin as Leonhartus Fuchsius, was a German physician and botanist. His chief notability is as the author of a large book about plants and their uses as medicines, a herbal, which was first published in 1542 in Latin. It has about 500 accurate and detailed drawings of plants, which were printed from woodcuts. The drawings are the book's most notable advance on its predecessors. Although drawings had been used in other herbal books, Fuchs's book proved and emphasized high-quality drawings as the most telling way to specify what a plant name stands for.

== Life ==
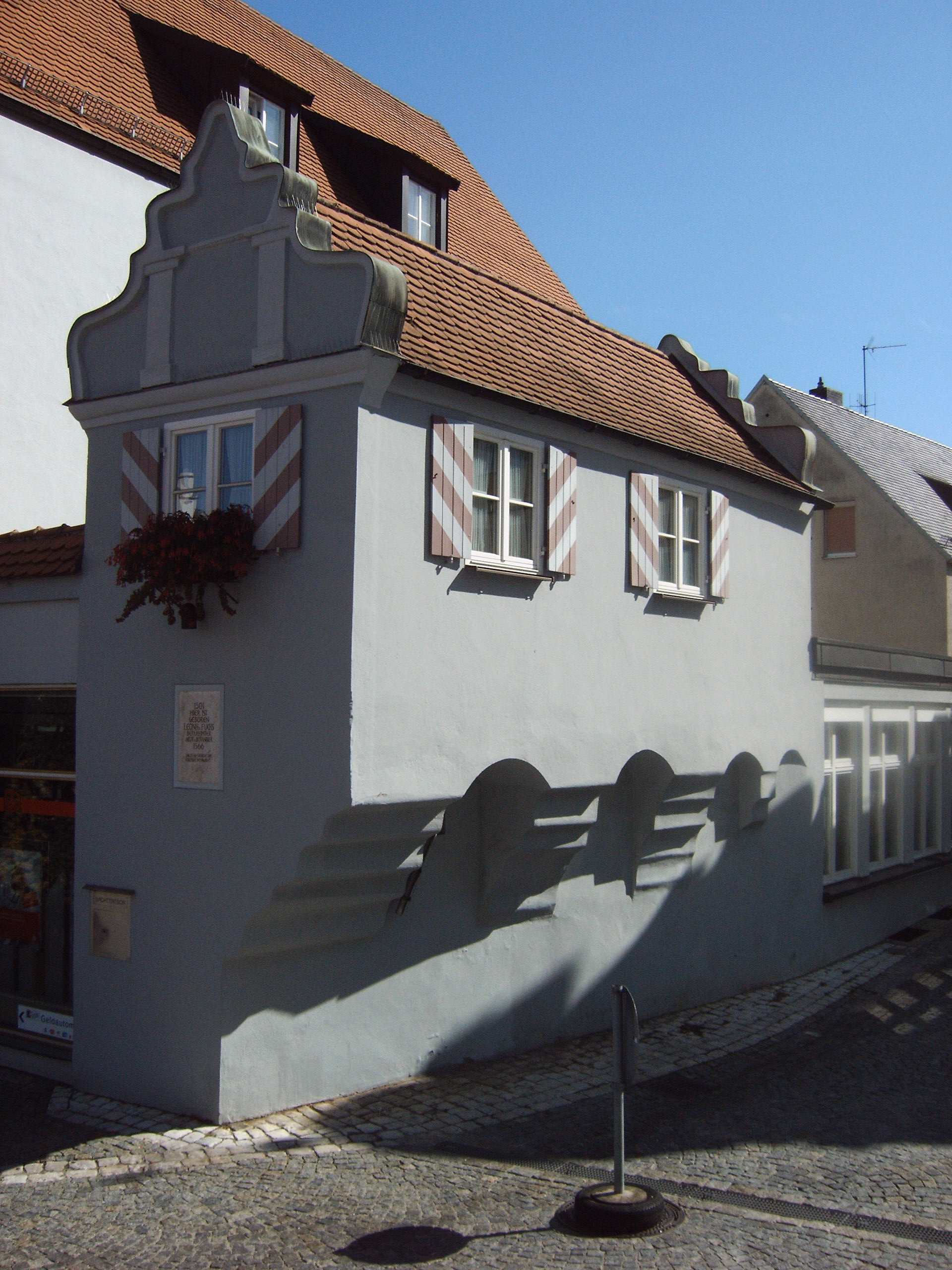
Fuchs Geburthaus, Wemding

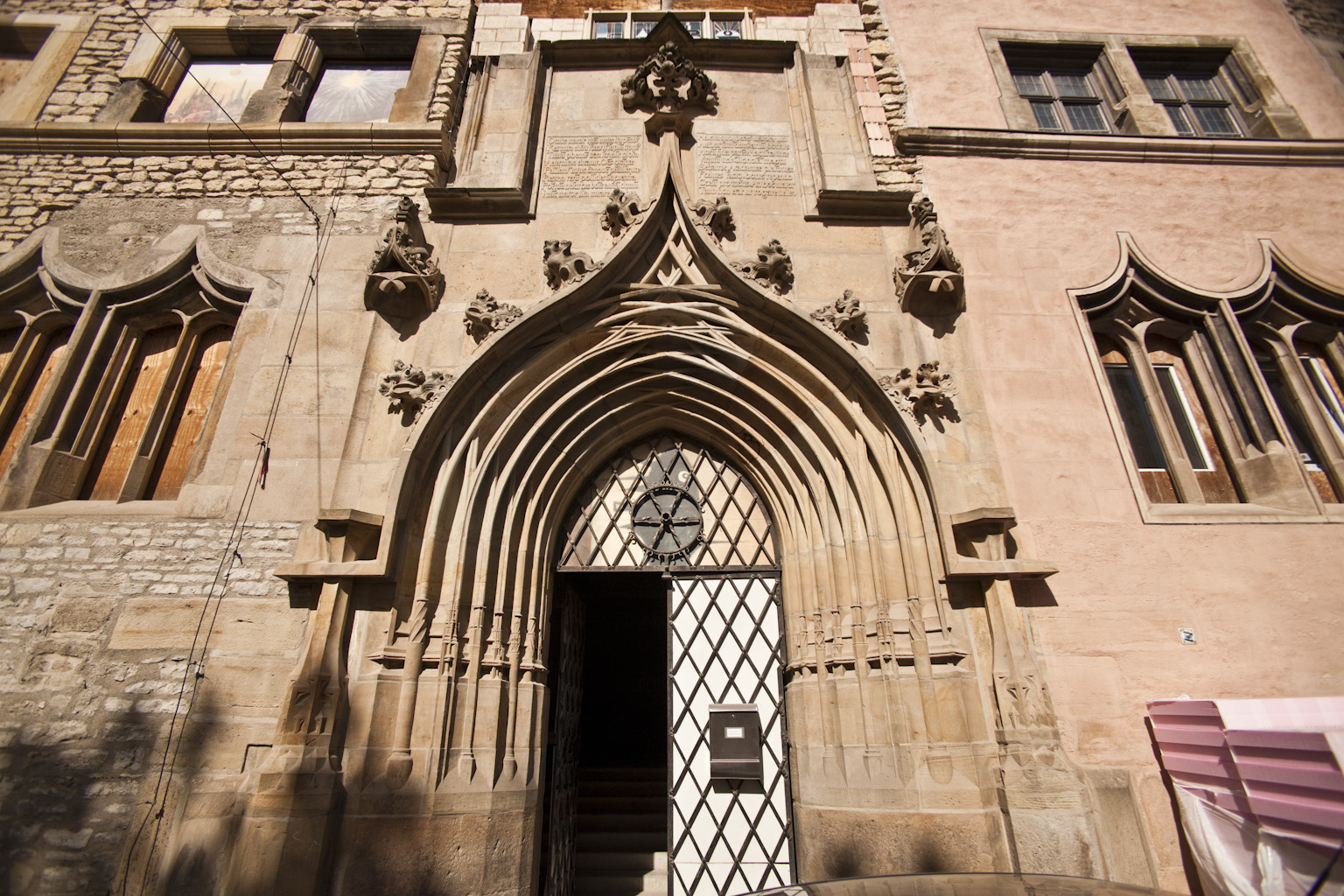
Main building of Erfurt University in 16th C

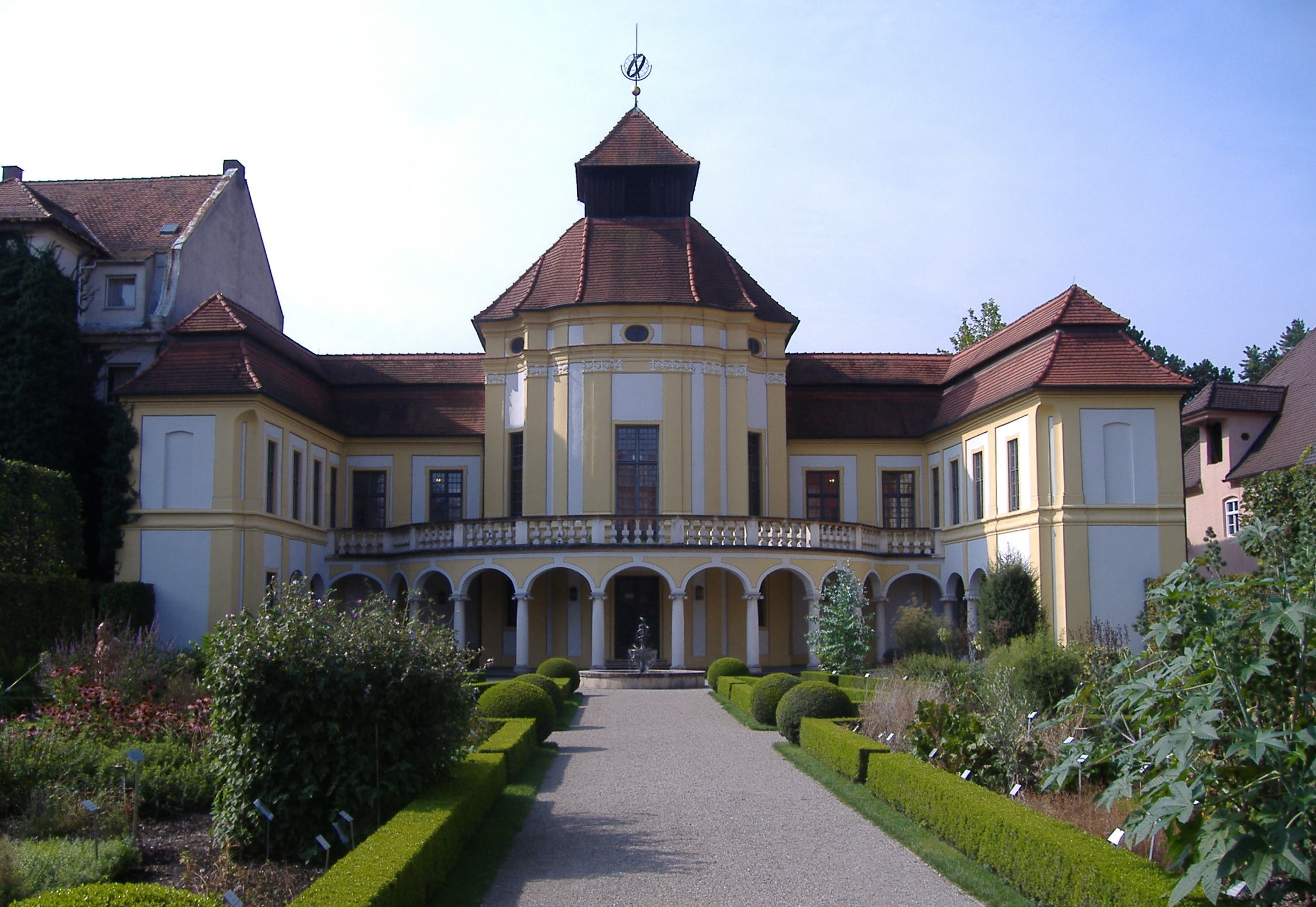
Old medical school at Ingolstadt

Fuchs was born in 1501 in Wemding (Marktplatz 5), near Donauwörth in Donau-Ries in the then Duchy of Bavaria, as the youngest son of Johann (Hans) Fuchs and his wife Anna Denten. (Note: Fuchs's mother's name is variously spelled as Denten, Denetorius or Denteni. Some sources state it as Zahn or Zähner, Denteni being a Latinised version of the German Zahn – tooth.) His father was the town Burgomaster, and both parents came from families of municipal councillors (Ratsherr). The exact date of his birth is unknown, but this was at the height of the German Renaissance. His father died prematurely in 1506, leaving Leonhart to be brought up by his mother and grandfather, an earlier Burgomaster.

His family considered him gifted, but felt that local schools could not provide him with the education he needed. In 1511, with help from relatives, he was sent to the Lateinschule (grammar school) (Note: The Heilbronn Lateinschule later became the Theodor-Heuss-Gymnasium Heilbronn) in Heilbronn (150 km west of Wemding), where Konrad Költer, the Rektor (1492–1527), also recognised his abilities. At that time, the school, had an excellent reputation, and Költer in particular for his teaching of Terence and Horace. The following year, Fuchs transferred to the Marienschule in Erfurt, Thuringia (320 km to the north), which provided intensive teaching in the classical languages, as a prerequisite to entrance in the University of Erfurt, which he then progressed to after six months. He was now eleven years old. At the time, the university at Erfurt was considered one of the premier German institutions of higher learning. At Erfurt, he matriculated in the Faculty of Arts, and by the 1516–7 winter semester had obtained his Baccalaureus artium, enabling him to teach, and he returned to Wemding to open a private school, at the age of 17. It was at Erfurt that he began his friendship with his contemporary, Joachim Camerarius.

On 28 June 1519 he started classes at the Hochschule (University of Ingolstadt), 62 km east of Wemding. There he studied Latin, Greek and Hebrew under, Johann Reuchlin and Jacob Ceporinus together with some philosophy and botany, and obtained his Magister Artium on 17 January 1521. During this time he became acquainted with the writings of Martin Luther, another graduate of Erfurt, and adopted the Lutheran faith. He then began to study medicine, obtaining his Medicinae Doctor on 1 March 1524.

From 1524 to 1526, he practised as a doctor in Munich, until he was offered the chair of medicine at the University of Ingolstadt in 1526. The university was firmly Roman Catholic and carefully monitored the religious practices and opinions of its professors, creating problems for Fuchs, given his Lutheran views. Thus, in 1528 he accepted a position in Ansbach (then Onoltzbach or Onsbach) as personal physician to Georg, Margrave of Brandenburg-Ansbach, a Protestant. The position, which he held to 1531, came with a promise of a professorship at a university the Margrave was planning to found there.

Fuchs was called to Tübingen by Ulrich, Duke of Württemberg, in 1533 to help in reforming the University of Tübingen in the spirit of humanism. He created its first medicinal garden in 1535 and served as chancellor seven times, spending the last thirty-one years of his life as professor of medicine. Fuchs died in Tübingen in 1566.

Whilst practising in Munich he met and married Anna Catherina Friedberger, the daughter of a city councillor, (Note: Anna Friedberger was described as "a most virtuous maiden, of respectable station, well brought up) (b. 1500 – d. 24 February 1563) in 1524. With her he had 4 sons and 6 daughters, two of whom died in infancy.

== Work ==
While working at Ansbach, Fuchs began his long career of scientific publications, beginning with his Errata recentiorum medicorum (Errors of modern doctors) in 1530, which he dedicated to his new patron. In this list of 60 "errors", Fuchs took a stand on the controversy between "Arabist" and Greek medical traditions, siding solidly with the latter, and pointing out the contradictions. In places, he went too far in rejecting or ignoring some aspects of Arab medicine that were uncontested. He also criticized the confusion in nomenclature which led to the production of medicines that did not demonstrate the alleged effects. The book was well received by some, with Brunfels reproducing it in the second volume of his own herbal (Novi herbarii) in 1531. From others it evoked fury. Fuchs rebutted "Arabist" criticisms of the work in his Paradoxorum medicinae (1535), an expanded version of the Errata.

Of his works on botanical illustration, the Codex Fuchs (Codex Vindobonensis Palatinus) is considered the most significant example of the Renaissance, with nine volumes, consisting of 1529 coloured plates. Those that are signed, are by Ziegler or Meyer.

=== Scientific views ===
Like his medieval predecessors and his contemporaries, Fuchs was heavily influenced by the three Greek and Roman writers on medicine and materia medica, Dioscorides, Hippocrates, and Galen. He wanted to fight the Arab hegemony in medicine, as it had been transmitted by the Medical School of Salerno, and to "return" to the Greek authors. Fuchs argued in favour of a return to using herbes medicinales ("simples"), in contrast to the arcane and often noxious "compounds" of medieval prescribing. But he also saw the importance of practical experience as well and offered botanical field days for the students, where he demonstrated the medicinal plants in situ. He founded one of the first German botanical gardens.

Fuchs, together with Brunfels and Bock, published herbals, and their joint efforts marked a mid-sixteenth century German botanical renaissance, each acknowledging the contributions of the others. Their connection to medicine ensured a wide and enduring audience, both professional and vernacular. The authority of these authors was based on the principles of medical humanism.

=== Selected publications ===
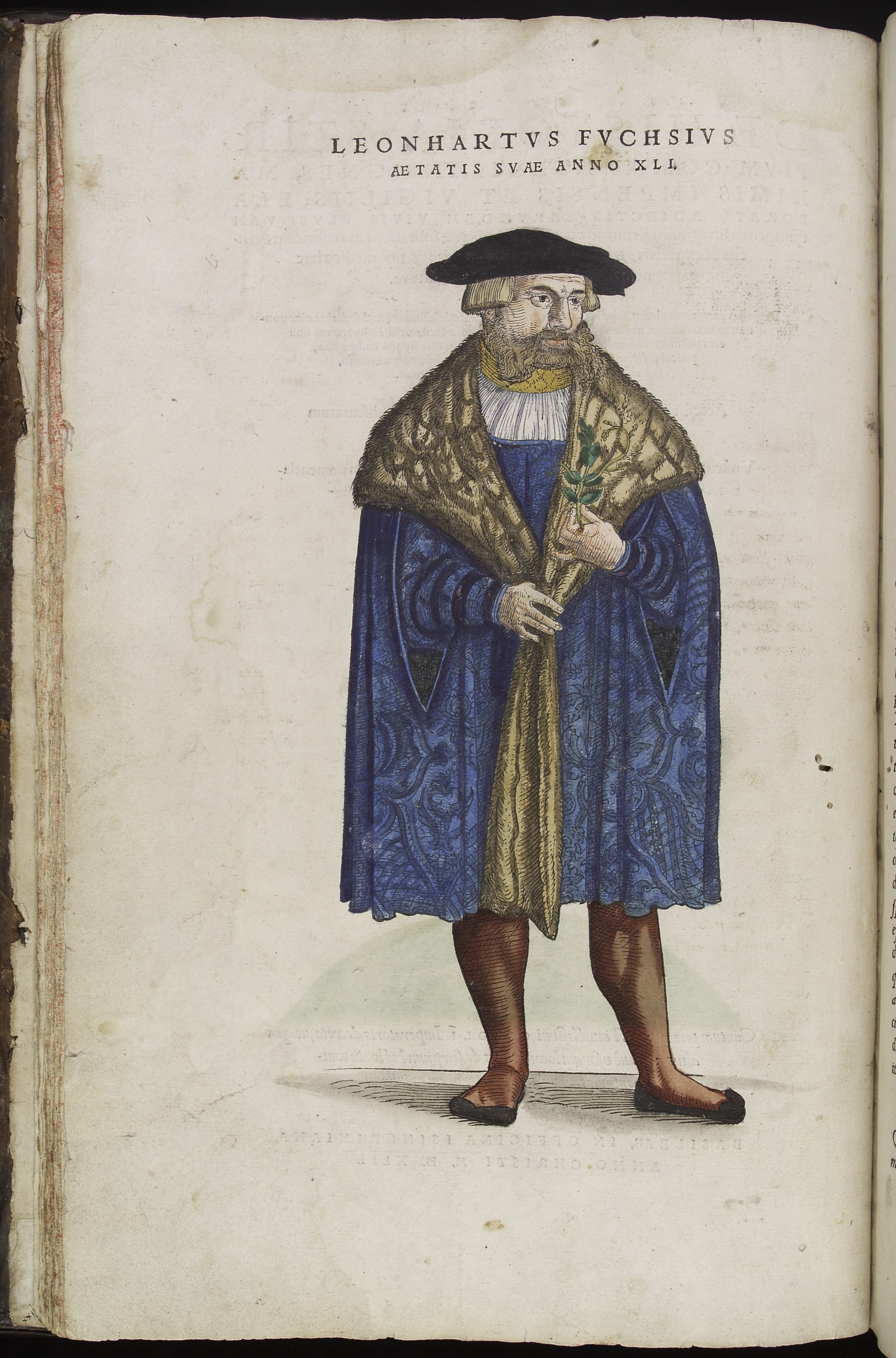
Fuchs, aged 41

Leonhart Fuchs wrote more than 50 books and polemics. Fuchs's books on the anatomy of the eye and its diseases were among the standard references on this subject during this period.

- Fuchs, Leonhart (1530). Errata recentiorum medicorum, 60. numero, adiectis eorundem confutationibus, in studiosorum gratiam, iam primum aedita. Leonardo Fuchsio medico, authore [Errors of modern doctors] (in Latin). Hagenau: in aedibus Iohannis Secerii.
- Compendiaria in artem medendi introductio […]. Hagenau 1531
- Hippocratis medicorum omnium longe principis Epidemiorum liber sextus 1532
- Paradoxorum medicinae III (1535)
- Alle Kranckheyt der Augen (All diseases of the eye) (1539)
- De Historia Stirpium commentarii insignes, Isingrin, Basel 1542
- Codex Fuchs, Tübingen 1536–1566

Together with Joachim Camerarius and Hieronymus Gemusaeus, he published a complete edited edition of the works of Galen, which was printed by Andreas Cratander in 1538.

==== De Historia Stirpium Commentarii Insignes ====
De historia is Fuchs's major work, a large book about plants and their uses as medicines (a herbal). The book first appeared in Latin in 1542, and was rapidly translated into other languages. Although the text is largely borrowed from earlier authors, and is not based on any system of classification, with its 512 plates it set a new standard in botanical illustration. The accurate and detailed drawings, printed from woodcuts, were the most notable advance on its predecessors. Although drawings had been used in other herbal books, Fuchs's book proved and emphasized high-quality drawings as the most telling way to specify what a plant name stands for. However, it was too erudite and too expensive to replace existing herbals.

== Legacy ==
Fuchs's name is commemorated in many ways in his home town of Wemding, which has adopted the nickname of Fuchsienstadt (Fuchsia City), used the colour Fuchsia as its theme and decorated public places with plantings of Fuchsia. The house where he was born (Geburtshaus Leonhart Fuchs) bears a plaque. Because it is so small, it is known as the Zwergenhäuschen (dwarf house). The plaque reads:

1501–1566. Hier ist geboren Leonhart Fuchs, berühmter Arzt und Botaniker. Nach ihm wurde die Fuchsie benannt
(1501–1566. Leonhart Fuchs, a famous doctor and botanist, was born here. The fuchsia was named after him)

For the 500th anniversary of his birth, a glass and steel pavilion for the fuchsia collection, the Fuchsienpavillon (Fuchsia house), was opened in 2001 in the Botanischer Garten der Universität Tübingen.

There is a cultivar of Fuchsia named 'Wemding' (1993), there is a Fuchsienrundgang (fuchsia tour) each year in Wemding, together with the creation of a fuchsia pyramid. There is a Fuchsien- und Kräutermarkt (fuchsia and herb market), some local businesses are named after Fuchs, and there is a Leonhart-Fuchs School.

Fuchs, together with his two older German colleagues, Otto Brunfels (1488–1534) and Hieronymus Bock (1498–1554), (Note: Arber adds Valerius Cordus (1515–1544) to this list of fathers of botany) has been described as a father of botany (or a German father of botany) establishing it as a scientific discipline independent from medicine in the sixteenth century, and a principal representative of New Galenism. His portrait forms the frontispiece of Agnes Arber's book on herbals. After his death, the manuscript and plates of his Historia were placed in the Österreichische Nationalbibliothek, Vienna, where it has remained.

=== Eponymy (proper name) ===
Fuchs's name is preserved by the plant Fuchsia, discovered in the Dominican Republic in the Caribbean in 1696/97 by the French scientist and Minim friar Charles Plumier. He published the first description of "Fuchsia triphylla, flore coccineo" in 1703. The dye fuchsine (fuchsin, rosaniline hydrochloride or magenta) is named after the flower, and thus, the color fuchsia is indirectly named after Fuchs. The dye, developed in 1859, was given the name of fuchsine in France by its original manufacturer Renard frères et Franc because its color was similar to color of flowers of certain Fuchsia species, as well as the fact that Renard in French and Fuchs in German both mean fox.

Fuchs is also recognised in the specific epithet of a plant widespread over Europe and northern Asia: the common spotted orchid, Dactylorhiza fuchsii.

== See also ==
- Learned medicine
- Medical Renaissance
- History of herbalism
- Lactofuchsin mount

== Bibliography ==
=== Books, dictionaries and encyclopaedias ===
- Arber, Agnes (1986) [1912; 2nd ed. 1938]. Stearn, William T. (ed.). Herbals: their origin and evolution. A chapter in the history of botany, 1470–1670 (3rd ed.). Cambridge: Cambridge University Press. ISBN 9780521338790.(2nd ed. (1938) available on Internet Archive)
- Fuchs, Leonhart (2022). Dressendörfer, Werner (ed.). The New Herbal. Taschen. ISBN 978-3-8365-8766-2.(Coloured version of German edition, New Kreüterbuch, Basell 1543, in Stadt Bibliothek, Ulm)
  - Dobat, Klaus. "Leonhart Fuchs: Physician and pioneer of modern botany". In Fuchs (2022), pp. 6–26.
- Lack, H. Walter (2021). A Garden Eden: Masterpieces of Botanical Illustration. Taschen. ISBN 978-3-8365-7739-7.
- Melanchthon, Philipp (2005). "Fuchs, Leonhard". In Scheible, Heinz (ed.). Melanchthons Briefwechsel: kritische und kommentierte Gesamtausgabe [Melanchthon's correspondence: critical and annotated complete edition] (in German). Vol. 12 (F–K). Stuttgart: Frommann-Holzboog. pp. 102–103. ISBN 978-3-7728-2258-2.
- Fuchs, Leonhart (1999) [1542]. Meyer, Frederick Gustav; Trueblood, Emily W. Emmart; Heller, John Lewis (eds.). The Great Herbal of Leonhart Fuchs: De historia stirpium commentarii insignes, 1542. ii vols. Stanford University Press. ISBN 978-0-8047-1631-4.
  - Tancin, Charlotte A (2000). "Meyer, Frederick G., Emily Emmart Trueblood and John L. Heller. The Great Herbal of Leonhart Fuchs: De Historia Stirpium Commentarii Insignes, 1542 (Notable Commentaries on the History of Plants). Vol. 1, Commentary. Vol. 2, Facsimile. Stanford, Calif.: Stanford University Press, 1999. Vol. 1, col. frontisp. (port.), xxiv, 895 pp., 106 col. plates (ports., illus.) Vol. 2, [xxviii], 896, [4] pp. (ports., illus.). $299.50. ISBN 0-8047-1631-5" (PDF). Huntia (Review). 11 (1): 88–91.
- Johnson, Christine R. (2008). The German Discovery of the World: Renaissance Encounters with the Strange and Marvelous. University of Virginia Press. ISBN 978-0-8139-2712-1.
- Kalba, Laura Anne (2017). Color in the Age of Impressionism: Commerce, Technology, and Art. Penn State Press. ISBN 978-0-271-07978-3.
- Kusukawa, Sachiko (2012). Picturing the Book of Nature: Image, Text, and Argument in Sixteenth-Century Human Anatomy and Medical Botany. University of Chicago Press. ISBN 978-0-226-46528-9.
- Pavord, Anna (2005). The naming of names the search for order in the world of plants. New York: Bloomsbury Publishing USA. ISBN 978-1-59691-965-5.(additional excerpts)
- Sachs, Julius von (1890) [1875]. Geschichte der Botanik vom 16. Jahrhundert bis 1860 [History of botany (1530–1860)]. Translated by Henry E. F. Garnsey. Revised by Isaac Bayley Balfour. Oxford: Oxford University Press. doi:10.5962/bhl.title.30585., see also History of botany (1530-1860) at Google Books
- Schmolke, Birgit (2007). "Fuchsienpavillon". Architektur neues Baden-Württemberg (in German). Braun. ISBN 978-3-938780-12-1.
- Tobyn, Graeme; Denham, Alison; Whitelegg, Midge (2011). "Historical sources". The Western Herbal Tradition: 2000 Years of Medicinal Plant Knowledge. Singing Dragon. pp. 1–22. ISBN 978-0-85701-259-3.
- Vines, Sydney Howard (1913). "Robert Morison 1620–1683 and John Ray 1627–1705". In Oliver, Francis Wall (ed.). Makers of British botany. Cambridge University Press. p. 9.
- Egerton, Frank N. III (2007). "Fuchs, Leonhart". In Koertge, Noretta (ed.). Complete Dictionary of Scientific Biography.
- EB (6 May 2022). Leonhard Fuchs: German botanist and physician. Encyclopædia Britannica.

=== Articles ===
- Chevreul, Michel-Eugène E (1861). "Note sur les étoffes de soie teintes avec la fuchsine, et réflexions sur la commerce des étoffes de couleur". Répertoire de Pharmacie (in French). 17. Paris: Baillière: 62–65.
- Fichtner, G (1968). "Neues zu Leben und Werk von Leonhart Fuchs aus seinen Briefen an Joachim Camerarius I. und II. in der Trew-Sammlung" [Recent information on the life and work of Leonhart Fuchs from his letters to Joachim Camerarius I. and II. in the Trew collection]. Gesnerus (in German). 25 (1): 65–82. doi:10.1163/22977953-0250102005. PMID 4894838.
- Kusukawa, Sachiko (1997). "Leonhart Fuchs on the Importance of Pictures". Journal of the History of Ideas. 58 (3): 403–427. doi:10.2307/3653907. JSTOR 3653907. PMID 11619413.
- Röcker, Bernd (2000). "Die Heilbronner Lateinschule und ihre Rektoren vor der Reformation" [The Heilbronn Latin School and its Rectors before the Reformation] (PDF). Heilbronnica (1). Beiträge zur Stadtgeschichte (Quellen und Forschungen zur Geschichte der Stadt Heilbronn 11) (in German). Stadtarchiv Heilbronn: 31–58.
- Bacalexi, Dina (April 2014). Ancient medicine, humanistic medicine: the Renaissance commentaries of Galen, transmission and transformation of knowledge. International Conference Scientiae 2014: Disciplines of knowing in the Early Modern World, Scientiae International Research Group. Vienna: HAL.
- Roth, Ferdinand Wilhelm Emil (1897). "Leonhard Fuchs, ein deutscher Botaniker, 1501–1566". Beihefte zum Botanischen Centralblatt (in German). 8 (3): 161–191.

=== Websites ===
- Smeets, Herman Leonard (2022). "Leonard (Leonhart) "(Dr.) Leonard Fuchs, Professor, Mediziner und Botaniker" Fuchs (1501–1566) » Stamboom Smeets/Berendsen » Genealogy Online". Genealogy Online. Coret Genealogy.
- Rath, Gernot (1961). "Fuchs, Leonhart". Neue Deutsche Biographie (in German). pp. 5: 681–682.(see also print version)
- Dickman, Rebecca (2013). "Leonhart Fuchs". The Three Founders of Botany: Rare Works from Special Collections. Iowa State University Library.
- Heilbronn (2022). "Leonhart Fuchs und sein "New Kreüterbuoch" von 1542". Stadtgeschichte (in German). Stadtarchiv Heilbronn.
- Tyrrell, Katherine. "About Leonhart Fuchs". Botanical Art & Artists.
- Wemding (2022). "Stadt Wemding: Die Fuchsienstadt".
- Open Book (21 May 2013). "Book of the Week – De Historia Stirpivm Commentarii Insignes". Open Book. J. Willard Marriott Library, University of Utah.
- Van Helden, Al (1995). "Fuchs, Leonhart". The Galileo Project. Rice University.
- Mittelschule (2022). "Namensgeber der Schule". Mittelschule Wemding – Leonhart Fuchs (in German).
- Spielman, Andre I (2022). "Leonhart (Leonhard) Fuchs 1501–1566". Rare book collection – 16th century. NYU College of Dentistry.
- Norman, Jeremy M (2022). "History of Information".
  - Norman (2022a). "Leonhard Fuchs' Unpublished Masterpiece of Renaissance Botany".
  - Norman (2022b). "Leonhard Fuchs, Albrecht Mayer, Heinrich Füllmaurer & Viet Rudolf Speckle Issue the First "Modern" Herbal, with Self-Portraits of the Artists".
- Trinity (24 February 2011). "Leonhart Fuchs (1501–1566)". Origins of Botany. Department of Botany, Trinity College, Dublin.
- Kelsey (2017). "Galen of Pergamum". The Art and Science of Healing, from Antiquity to the Renaissance. Kelsey Museum of Archaeology, University of Michigan.
- Zathammer, Stefan (19 November 2021). "Errata recentiorum medicorum". Nova Scientia. University of Innsbruck.
- Asher (2022). "Last edition during Fuchs life of his own revision of his first publication, promoting medical "simples" originally published 12 years before his great herbal, De historia stirpium". Antiquariaat Forum: Medicine & Pharmacy pre 1700. Asher Rare Books.
