= Hugo Schiff =

German-Italian chemist (1834–1915)

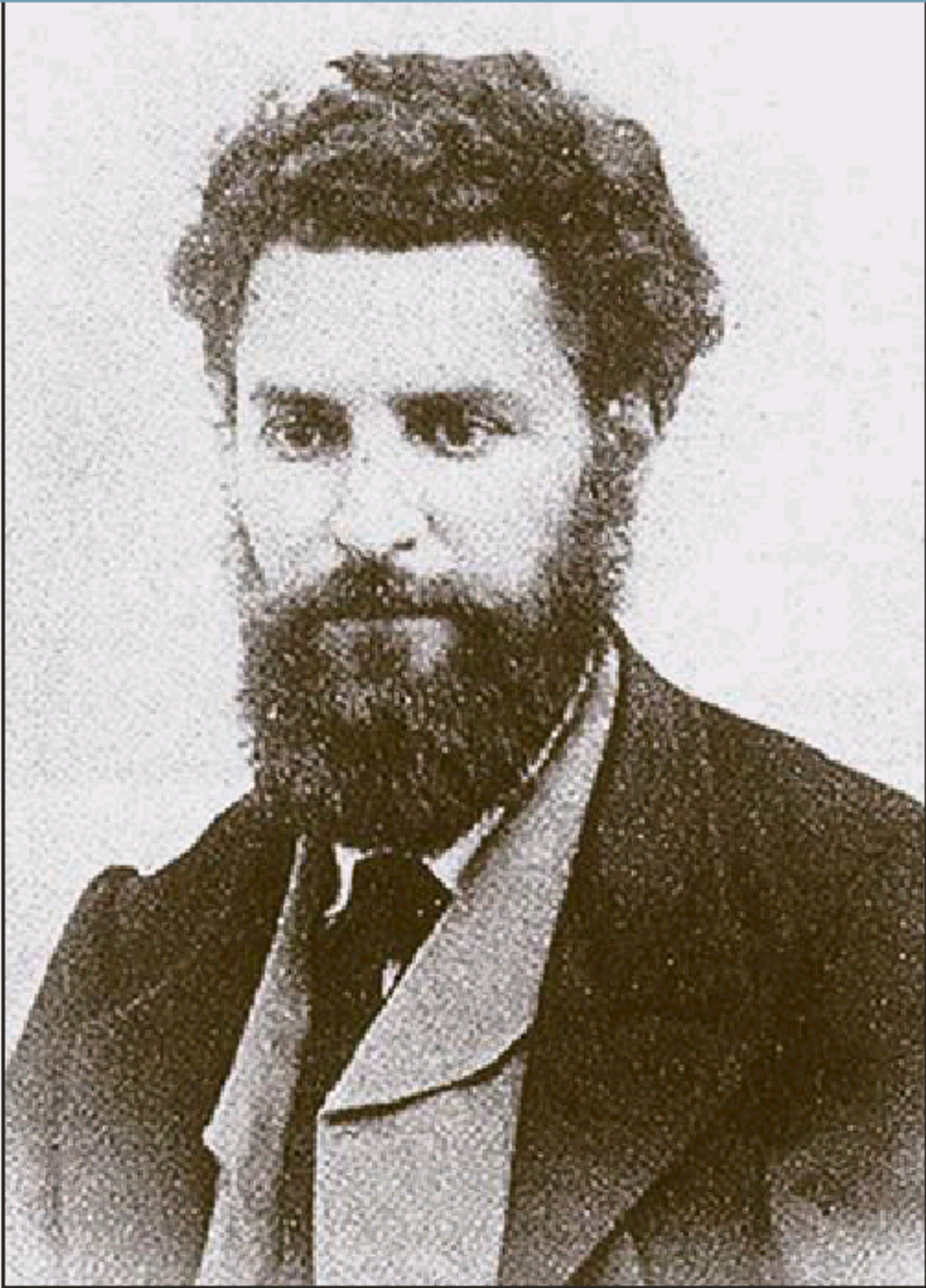
- Hugo Schiff
- Born: 26 April 1834; Frankfurt, Germany
- Died: 8 September 1915 (aged 81); Florence, Italy
- Education: University of Göttingen
- Known for: Schiff base Schiff test
- Scientific career
- Workplaces: University of Pisa; Museo di Storia Naturale di Firenze; University of Turin
- Doctoral advisor: Friedrich Wöhler

Hugo (Ugo) Schiff (26 April 1834 – 8 September 1915) was an Italian naturalized chemist. The son of a Jewish businessman and brother of the physiologist Moritz Schiff, Hugo Schiff was German by nationality. He discovered Schiff bases and other imines, and was responsible for research into aldehydes, leading to his development of the Schiff test. He also worked in the field of amino acids and the Biuret reagent.

Born in Frankfurt am Main, Schiff was a student of Friedrich Wöhler in Göttingen. He completed his dissertation (Über einige Naphthyl- und Phenylderivate) also supervised by Wöhler in 1857. In the same year, due to political turmoil, Schiff left Germany in 1857 for Switzerland and the University of Bern. He was a supporter of socialism and reportedly corresponded with Karl Marx and Friedrich Engels. He also was a cofounder of the socialist Italian newspaper L'Avanti in 1894.

Schiff moved to Italy in 1863, holding positions in Pisa and then the Florence Museum of Natural History. In 1870 he cofounded the journal Gazzetta Chimica Italiana together with Stanislao Cannizzaro. In 1877 he became a professor of general chemistry in Turin and returned to Florence in 1879 as a professor of general chemistry at what later would become the University of Florence, where he founded the Chemical Institute of the University of Florence. Schiff died in Florence.

At the University of Florence, the Hugo Schiff International Store House still exists today.
