= Crystal violet =

Triarylmethane dye

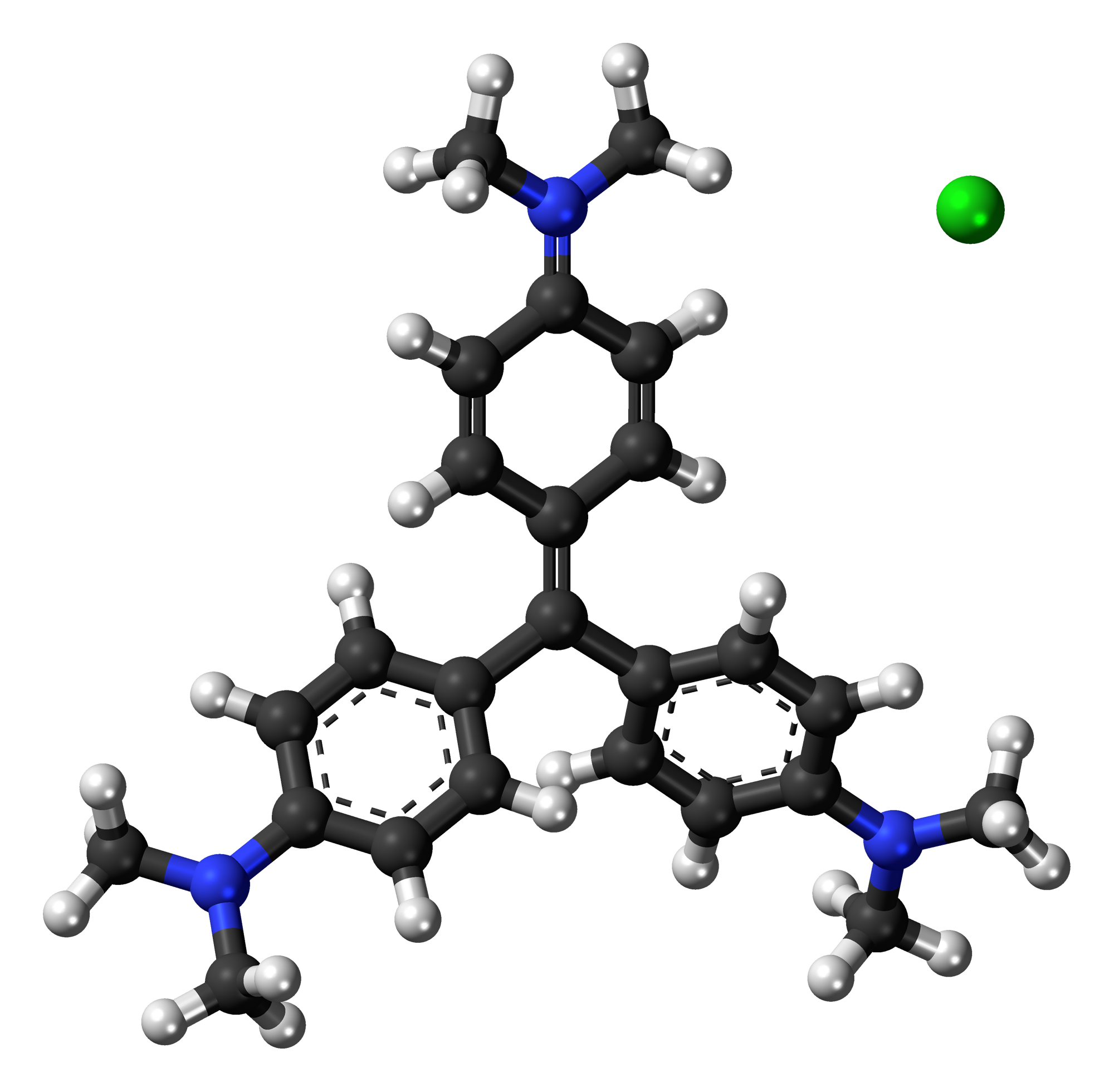

Names
- Preferred IUPAC name 4-{Bis[4-(dimethylamino)phenyl]methylidene}-N,N-dimethylcyclohexa-2,5-dien-1-iminium chloride
- Other names: Aniline violet; Basic violet 3; Baszol violet 57L; Brilliant violet 58; Hexamethyl-p-rosaniline chloride; Methylrosanilide chloride; Methyl Violet 10B; Methyl violet 10BNS; Pyoctanin

Identifiers
CAS Number	548-62-9; 1733-13-7 (base)
3D model (JSmol)	Interactive image; Interactive image
Beilstein Reference	3580948
ChEBI	CHEBI:41688
ChEMBL	ChEMBL64894
ChemSpider	10588
DrugBank	DB00406
ECHA InfoCard	100.008.140
EC Number	208-953-6
KEGG	D01046
MeSH	Gentian+violet
PubChem CID	11057; CID 68050 from PubChem (base)
RTECS number	BO9000000
UNII	J4Z741D6O5; B4JIJ2C6AT (base)
UN number	3077
CompTox Dashboard (EPA)	DTXSID5020653
- InChI: InChI=1S/C25H30N3.ClH/c1-26(2)22-13-7-19(8-14-22)25(20-9-15-23(16-10-20)27(3)4)21-11-17-24(18-12-21)28(5)6;/h7-18H,1-6H3;1H/q+1;/p-1 Key: ZXJXZNDDNMQXFV-UHFFFAOYSA-M; InChI=1/C25H30N3.ClH/c1-26(2)22-13-7-19(8-14-22)25(20-9-15-23(16-10-20)27(3)4)21-11-17-24(18-12-21)28(5)6;/h7-18H,1-6H3;1H/q+1;/p-1 Key: ZXJXZNDDNMQXFV-REWHXWOFAV
- SMILES: [Cl-].CN(C)c1ccc(cc1)[C+](c1ccc(cc1)N(C)C)c1ccc(cc1)N(C)C; [Cl-].CN(C)C1=CC=C(C=C1)[C+](C1=CC=C(C=C1)N(C)C)C1=CC=C(C=C1)N(C)C

Properties
Chemical formula	C_{25}H_{30}ClN_{3}
Molar mass	407.99 g·mol^{−1}
Melting point	205 °C (decomposes)
Solubility in water	4 g/L at 25 °C

Pharmacology
ATC code	D01AE02 (WHO) G01AX09 (WHO)

Hazards
- GHS labelling
Pictograms	(GHS05: Corrosive) (GHS07: Exclamation mark) (GHS08: Health hazard) (GHS09: Environmental hazard)
Signal word	Danger
Hazard statements	H302, H318, H351, H410
Precautionary statements	P273, P280, P305+P351+P338, P501
- Lethal dose or concentration (LD, LC)
LD_{50} (median dose)	1.2 g/kg (oral, mice) 1.0 g/kg (oral, rats)
- Except where otherwise noted, data are given for materials in their standard state (at 25 °C [77 °F], 100 kPa). verify (what is ?) Infobox references

Crystal violet or gentian violet, also known as methyl violet 10B or hexamethyl pararosaniline chloride, is a triarylmethane dye used as a histological stain and in Gram's method of classifying bacteria. Crystal violet has antibacterial, antifungal, and anthelmintic (vermicide) properties and was formerly important as a topical antiseptic. The medical use of the dye has been largely superseded by more modern drugs, although it is still listed by the World Health Organization.

The name gentian violet was once used for a mixture of methyl pararosaniline dyes (methyl violet), but it is considered a synonym for crystal violet. The name refers to its colour, being like that of the petals of certain gentian flowers; it is not made from gentians or violets.

== Production ==
An economical method for synthesizing crystal violet involves the reaction of N,N-dimethylaniline (1) with phosgene (2) in a one-pot reaction. In the presence of zinc chloride, Michler’s ketone (4,4′-bis(dimethylamino)benzophenone) (3) is formed as the main product. It is then reacted with phosgene without intermediate isolation to form the intermediate 4, which subsequently reacts with N,N-dimethylaniline to yield crystal violet (5).

Illustration of crystal violet

Alternatively, Michler’s ketone (1) can undergo a condensation reaction with N,N-dimethylaniline (2) in the presence of phosphorus oxychloride. In this reaction, electrophilic aromatic substitution occurs at the para position of N,N-dimethylaniline, where the carbon atom of the carbonyl group of Michler’s ketone acts as the electrophile. Phosphorus oxychloride acts as an electron-pair acceptor for the oxygen atom of the ketone’s carbonyl group. This makes the carbonyl carbon positively charged and enables it to attack the aromatic compound electrophilically. Water is subsequently eliminated from the resulting carbinol base (3).

Illustration of crystal violet

A variant of the synthesis originally developed by Kern also starts with Michler’s ketone (1). First, the so-called Michler’s hydrol, bis[4-(dimethylamino)phenyl]methanol (2), is formed by reduction with zinc dust or sodium borohydride. Condensation of the hydrol with N,N-dimethylaniline (3) yields the leuco base (4). Oxidation of the leuco base in the presence of hydrochloric acid yields crystal violet (5).

Illustration of crystal violet

The leuco base can also be obtained by reacting dimethylaminobenzaldehyde with two molar equivalents of N,N-dimethylaniline.

Another one-pot synthesis involves the reaction of N,N-dimethylaniline (1) with formaldehyde (2). Formaldehyde is generated in situ from paraformaldehyde, initially yielding Michler's base (3). In the presence of the iron complex of dihydrodibenzotetraaza[14]annulene (5) as a catalyst, atmospheric oxygen and tetrachloro-p-benzoquinone (6) oxidize Michler’s base to crystal violet (4).

Representation of crystal violet

Crystal violet is produced in India, China, and, to a limited extent, the United States. Production volumes in China and India are unknown. In the United States, production volumes of 227–454 metric tons were reported for 1986 and 1990. Crystal violet is not produced in the European Union, but the EU imported between 210 and 230 metric tons of the compound in 2012.

== Dye colour ==
Crystal violet (pH indicator)
below pH −1.0		above pH 2.0
(yellow) −1.0	⇌	2.0 (violet)

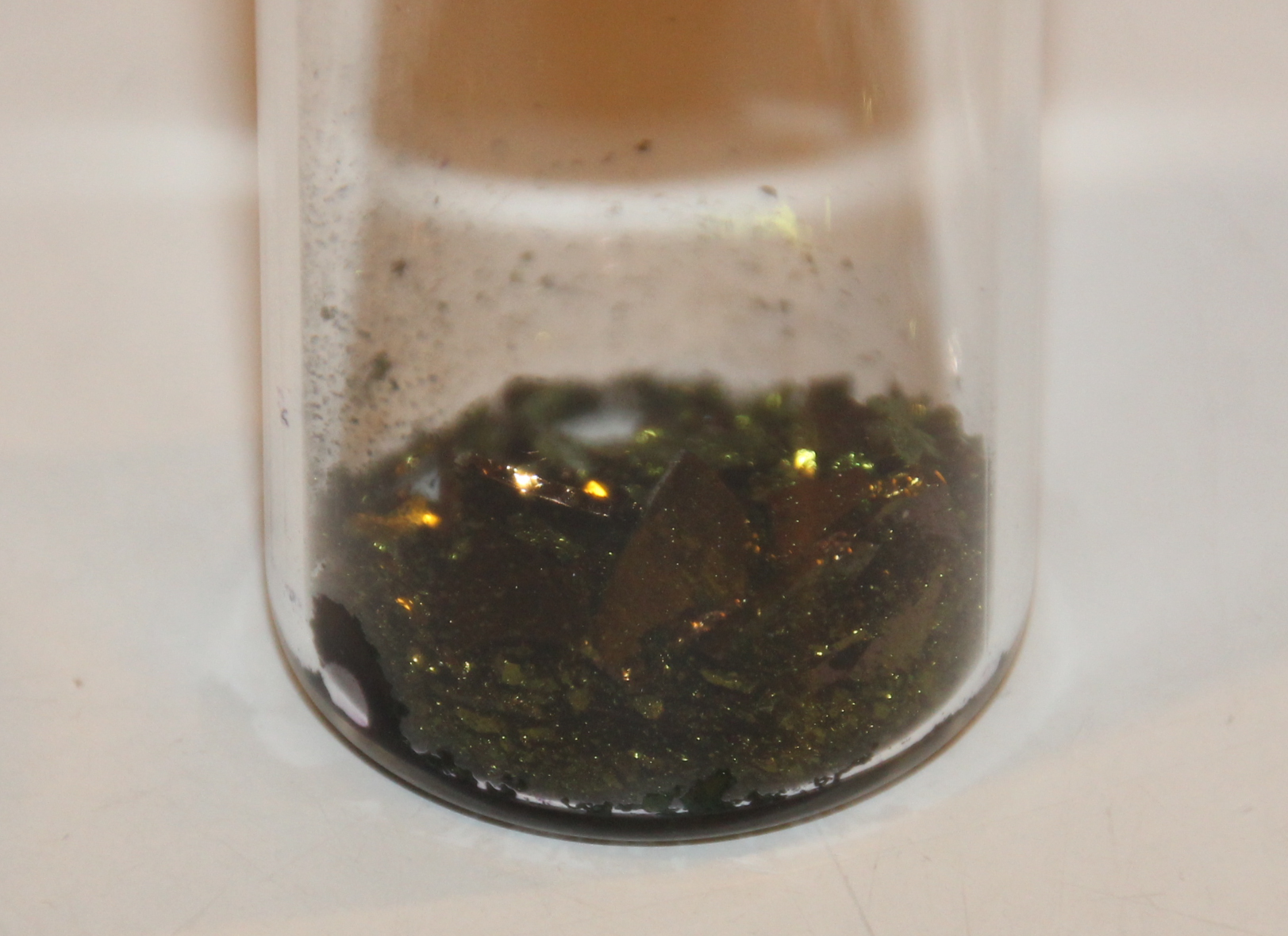
Solid crystal violet

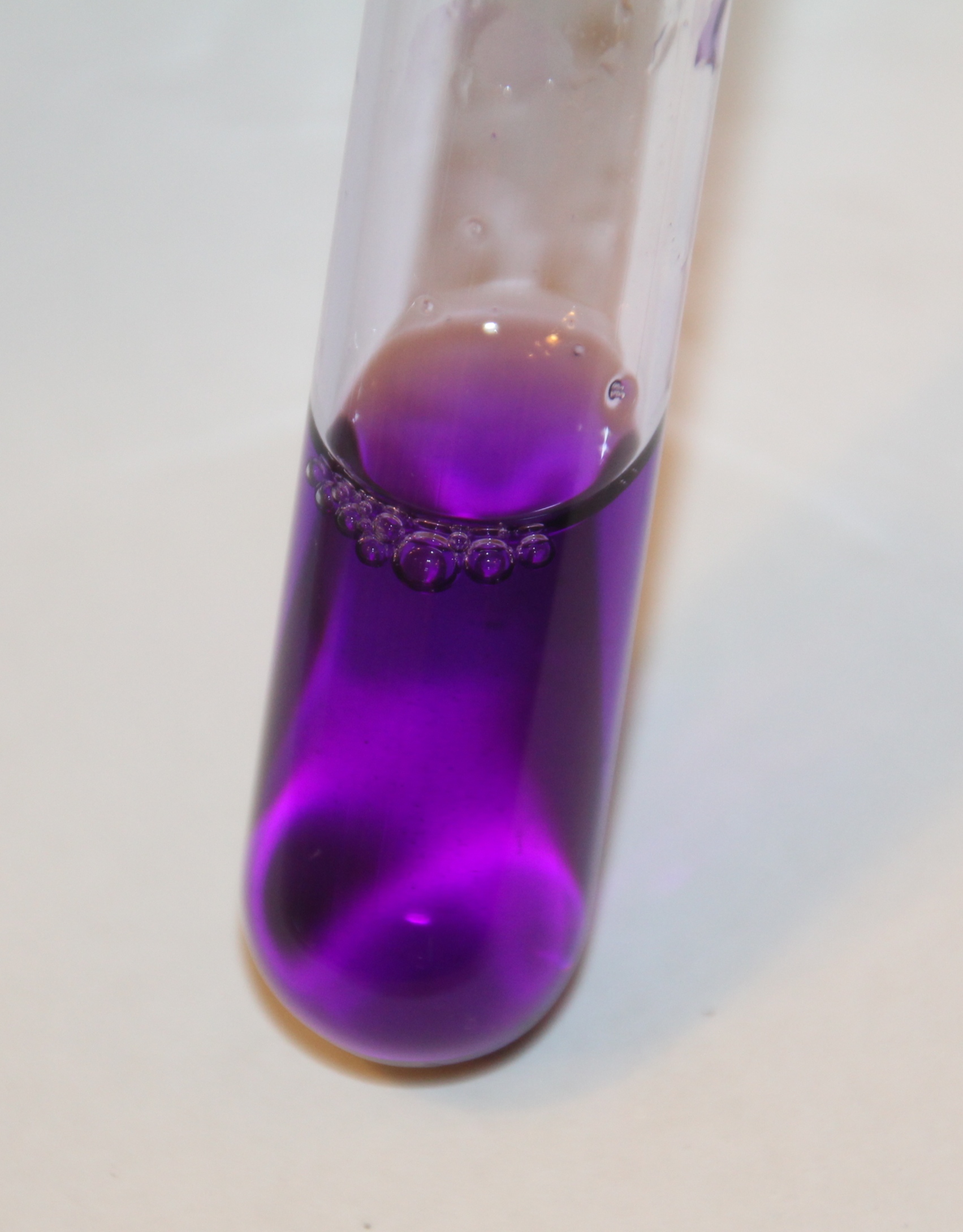
Crystal violet in aqueous solution

When dissolved in water, the dye has a blue-violet colour with an absorbance maximum at 590 nm and an extinction coefficient of 87,000 M^{−1} cm^{−1}. The colour of the dye depends on the acidity of the solution. At a pH of +1.0, the dye is green with absorption maxima at 420 nm and 620 nm, while in a strongly acidic solution (pH −1.0), the dye is yellow with an absorption maximum at 420 nm.

The different colours are a result of the different charged states of the dye molecule. In the yellow form, all three nitrogen atoms carry a positive charge, of which two are protonated, while the green colour corresponds to a form of the dye with two of the nitrogen atoms positively charged. At neutral pH, both extra protons are lost to the solution, leaving only one of the nitrogen atoms positive charged. The pK_{a} for the loss of the two protons are approximately 1.15 and 1.8.

In alkaline solutions, nucleophilic hydroxyl ions attack the electrophilic central carbon to produce the colourless triphenylmethanol or carbinol form of the dye. Some triphenylmethanol is also formed under very acidic conditions when the positive charges on the nitrogen atoms lead to an enhancement of the electrophilic character of the central carbon, which allows the nucleophilic attack by water molecules. This effect produces a slight fading of the yellow colour.

Crystal violet is used as a humidity indicator, in silica gel for example, being orange when dry and going through green to violet when exposed to increasing amount of moisture.

== Applications ==
=== Industry ===
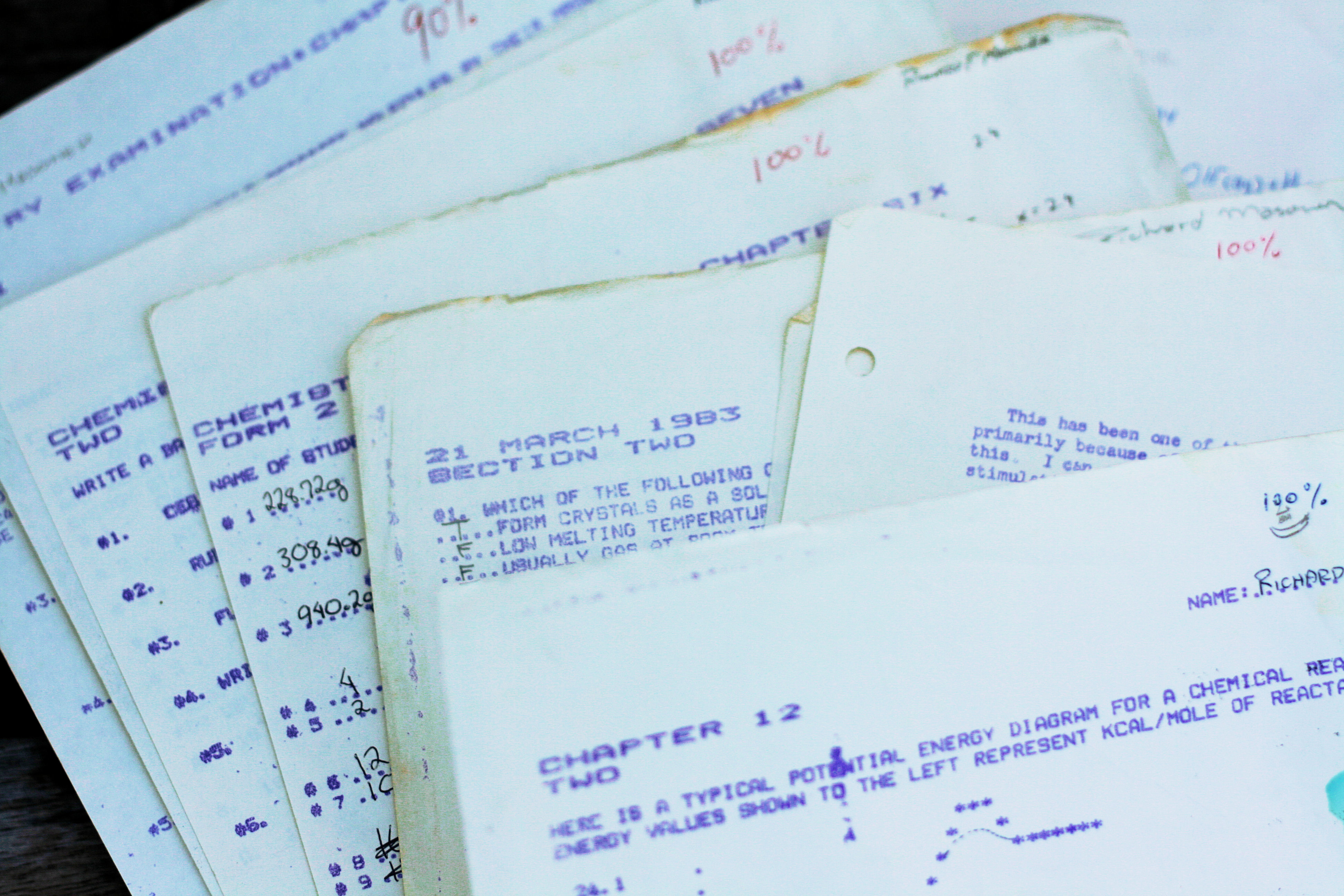
Ditto machine duplicated tests papers, inked with crystal violet.

Crystal violet is used as a textile and paper dye, and is a component of navy blue and black inks for printing, ball-point pens, and inkjet printers. Historically, it was the most common dye used in early duplication machines, such as the hectograph and the ditto machine. It is sometimes used to colourize diverse products such as fertilizer, antifreeze, detergent, and leather. Marking blue, used to mark out pieces in metalworking, is composed of methylated spirits, shellac, and gentian violet.

=== Science ===
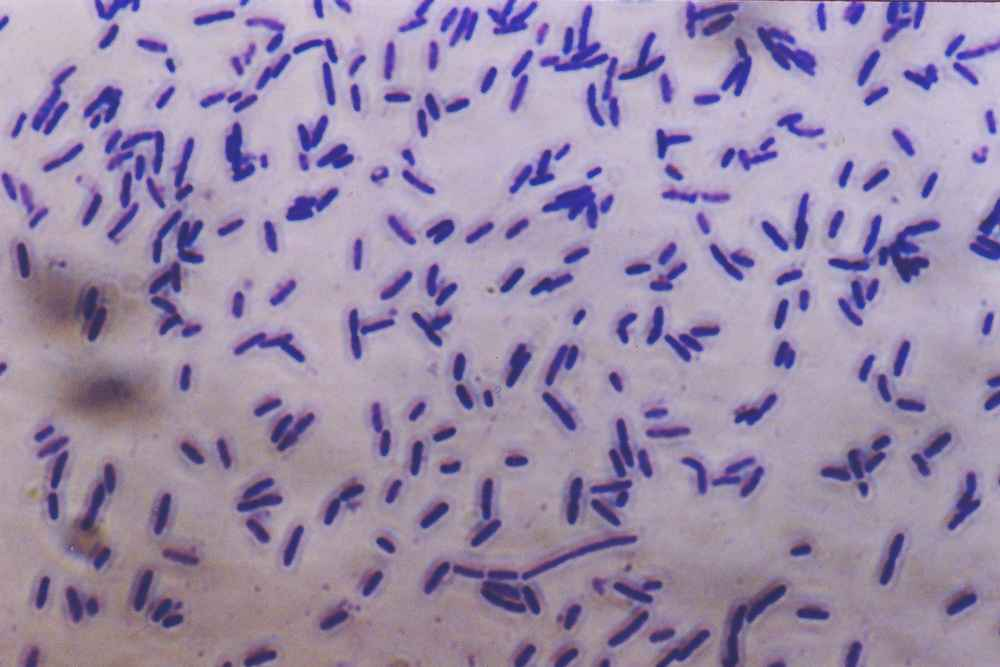
Bacteria stained with crystal violet

When conducting DNA gel electrophoresis, crystal violet can be used as a nontoxic DNA stain as an alternative to fluorescent, intercalating dyes such as ethidium bromide. Used in this manner, it may be either incorporated into the agarose gel or applied after the electrophoresis process is finished. Used at a 10 ppm concentration and allowed to stain a gel after electrophoresis for 30 minutes, it can detect as little as 16 ng of DNA. Through use of a methyl orange counterstain and a more complex staining method, sensitivity can be improved further to 8 ng of DNA. When crystal violet is used as an alternative to fluorescent stains, it is not necessary to use ultraviolet illumination; this has made crystal violet popular as a means of avoiding UV-induced DNA destruction when performing DNA cloning in vitro.

Crystal violet can be used as an alternative to Coomassie brilliant blue (CBB) in staining of proteins separated by SDS-PAGE, reportedly showing a 5x improved sensitivity vs CBB.

The dye is used as a histological stain, particularly in Gram staining for classifying bacteria.

In biomedical research, crystal violet can be used to stain the nuclei of adherent cells. In this application, crystal violet works as an intercalating dye and allows the quantification of DNA which is proportional to the number of cells.

Crystal violet is also used as a tissue stain in the preparation of light microscopy sections. In laboratory, solutions containing crystal violet and formalin are often used to simultaneously fix and stain cells grown in tissue culture to preserve them and make them easily visible, since most cells are colourless.

It is also sometimes used as a cheap way to put identification markings on laboratory mice; since many strains of lab mice are albino, the purple colour stays on their fur for several weeks.

In forensics, crystal violet was used to develop fingerprints. It is able to develop fingerprint marks from live human skin.

=== Medical ===
Gentian violet has antibacterial, antifungal, antihelminthic, antitrypanosomal, antiangiogenic, and antitumor properties. It is used medically for these properties, in particular for dentistry, and is also known as "pyoctanin" (or "pyoctanine"). It is commonly used for:

- Marking the skin for surgery preparation and allergy testing;
- Treating Candida albicans and related fungal infections, such as thrush, yeast infections, various types of tinea (ringworm, athlete's foot, jock itch);
- Treating impetigo; it was used primarily before the advent of antibiotics, but still useful to persons who may be allergic to penicillin.

In resource-limited settings, gentian violet is used to manage burn wounds, inflammation of the umbilical cord stump (omphalitis) in the neonatal period, oral candidiasis in HIV-infected patients and mouth ulcers in children with measles.

In body piercing, gentian violet is commonly used to mark the location for placing piercings, including surface piercings.

=== Veterinary ===
Because of its antimicrobial activity, it is used to treat ich in fish. However, it usually is illegal to use in fish intended for human consumption.

== History ==
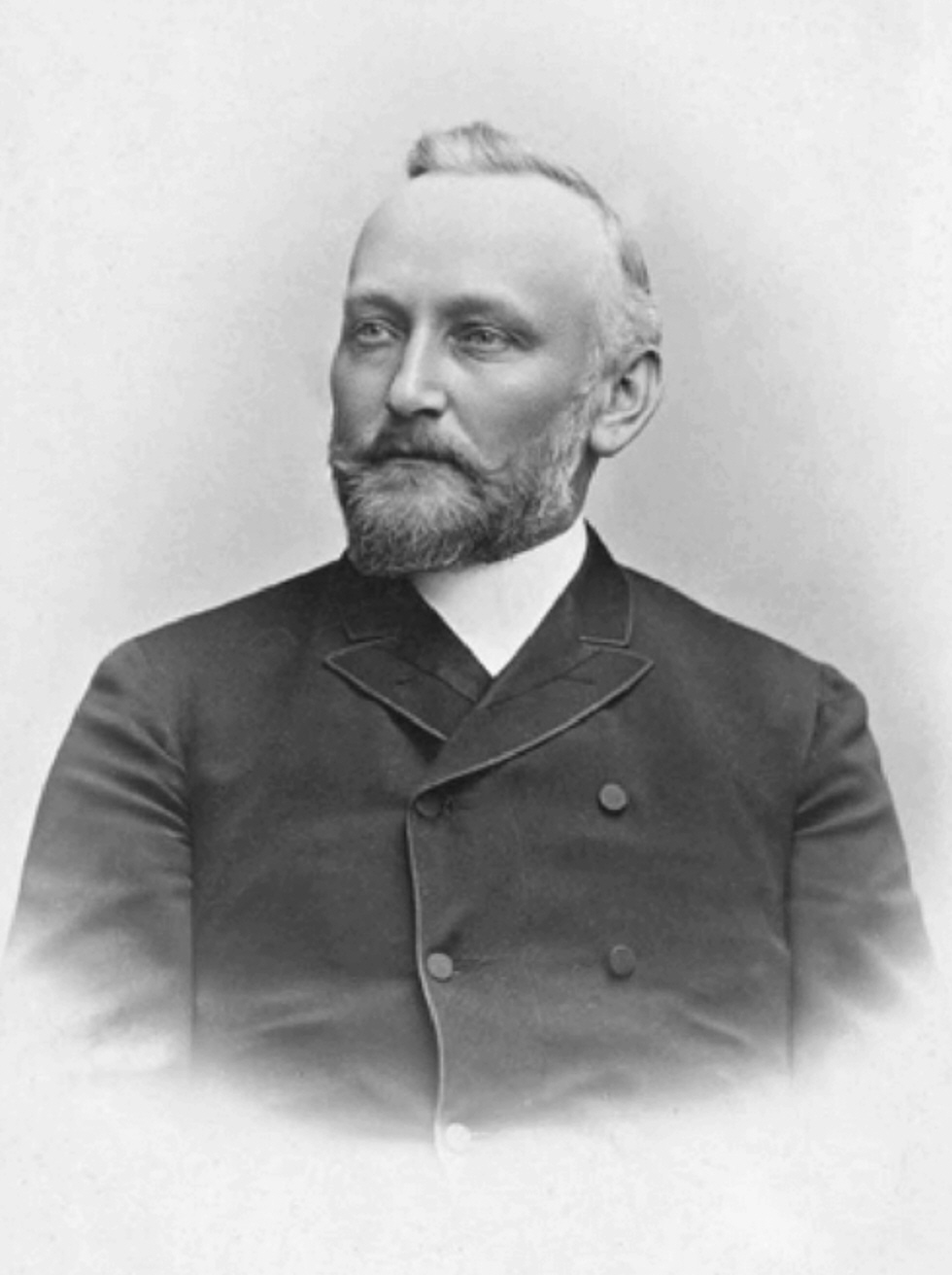
Alfred Kern (around 1890)

=== Synthesis ===
Crystal violet is one of the components of methyl violet, a dye first synthesized by Charles Lauth in 1861. From 1866, methyl violet was manufactured by the Saint-Denis-based firm of Poirrier et Chappat and marketed under the name "Violet de Paris". It was a mixture of the tetra-, penta- and hexamethylated pararosanilines.

Crystal violet itself was first synthesized in 1883 by Alfred Kern (1850–1893) working in Basel at the firm of Bindschedler & Busch. To optimize the difficult synthesis which used the highly toxic phosgene, Kern entered into a collaboration with the German chemist Heinrich Caro at BASF. Kern also found that by starting with diethylaniline rather than dimethylaniline, he could synthesize the closely related violet dye now known as C.I. 42600 or C.I. Basic violet 4.

=== Gentian violet ===
The name "gentian violet" (or Gentianaviolett in German) is thought to have been introduced by the German pharmacist Georg Grübler, who in 1880 started a company in Leipzig that specialized in the sale of staining reagents for histology. The gentian violet stain marketed by Grübler probably contained a mixture of methylated pararosaniline dyes. The stain proved popular and in 1884 was used by Hans Christian Gram to stain bacteria. He credited Paul Ehrlich for the aniline-gentian violet mixture. Grübler's gentian violet was probably very similar, if not identical, to Lauth's methyl violet, which had been used as a stain by Victor André Cornil in 1875.

Although the name gentian violet continued to be used for the histological stain, the name was not used in the dye and textile industries. The composition of the stain was not defined and different suppliers used different mixtures. In 1922, the Biological Stain Commission appointed a committee chaired by Harold Conn to look into the suitability of the different commercial products. In his book Biological Stains, Conn describes gentian violet as a "poorly defined mixture of violet rosanilins".

The German ophthalmologist Jakob Stilling is credited with discovering the antiseptic properties of gentian violet. He published a monograph in 1890 on the bactericidal effects of a solution that he christened "pyoctanin", which was probably a mixture of aniline dyes similar to gentian violet. He set up a collaboration with E. Merck & Co. to market "Pyoktanin caeruleum" as an antiseptic.

In 1902, Drigalski and Conradi found that although crystal violet inhibited the growth of many bacteria, it has little effect on Bacillus coli (Escherichia coli) and Bacillus typhi (Salmonella typhi), which are both gram-negative bacteria. A much more detailed study of the effects of Grübler's gentian violet on different strains of bacteria was published by John Churchman in 1912. He found that most gram-positive bacteria (tainted) were sensitive to the dye, while most gram-negative bacteria (not tainted) were not, and observed that the dye tended to act as a bacteriostatic agent rather than a bactericide.

==== Precautions ====
One study in mice demonstrated dose-related carcinogenic potential at several different organ sites.

The Food and Drug Administration in the US (FDA) has determined that gentian violet has not been shown by adequate scientific data to be safe for use in animal feed. Use of gentian violet in animal feed causes the feed to be adulterated and is a violation of the Federal Food, Drug, and Cosmetic Act in the US. On June 28, 2007, the FDA issued an "import alert" on farm-raised seafood from China because unapproved antimicrobials, including gentian violet, had been consistently found in the products. The FDA report states:

Like MG (malachite green), CV (crystal violet) is readily absorbed into fish tissue from water exposure and is reduced metabolically by fish to the leuco moiety, leucocrystal violet (LCV). Several studies by the National Toxicology Program reported the carcinogenic and mutagenic effects of crystal violet in rodents. The leuco form induces renal, hepatic and lung tumor in mice."

In 2019, Health Canada (HC) completed safety reviews on gentian violet and found it to be carcinogenic when in direct contact with the body. As a result, HC has worked with human and animal drug makers to discontinue and recall all drugs containing gentian violet, and recommended customers stop using and safely discard any remaining directly administered drug products that contain gentian violet.

HC decided that medical devices containing gentian violet could remain on the Canadian market, as gentian violet within polyurethane foam dressings was unlikely to come into direct contact with skin. However, HC recommended most people to limit the use of these dressings to 6 months at most.

They also advised against the use of gentian violet preparations on the skin, for instance on the nipple of a nursing mother to treat infant oral thrush. HC advised pregnant and nursing women to avoid using it altogether, as there's not enough evidence to prove that any use of gentian violet in pregnancy or while breastfeeding is safe. This caused Canadian engineering schools to revisit the usage of this dye during orientation, in which students "purple" themselves by dunking into a tub containing a dilute solution of the dye.

== See also ==
- Crystal violet lactone
- Methyl green – Chemical compound
- Methyl violet – Group of chemical compounds used as dye
- Fluorescein – Synthetic organic compound used as dye and fluorescent tracer
- Prussian blue – Synthetic pigment
- Egyptian blue – Pigment used in ancient Egypt
- Methyl blue – Chemical compound
- Methylene blue – Blue dye also used as a medication
- New methylene blue – Substance used as a blue dye and as a medication
- Han purple – Pigments developed in ancient China
- Potassium ferrocyanide – Chemical compound
- Potassium ferricyanide – Chemical compound
