= Jakub Natanson =

Polish scientist and banker

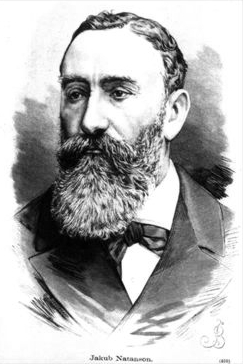
Jakub Natanson

Jakub Natanson (20 August 1832 – 14 September 1884) was a Polish Jewish chemist and banker, one of the discoverers of Fuchsine. He wrote the first textbook on organic chemistry in the Polish language.

== Life ==
He was born 20 August 1832 in Warsaw as the son of a banker. From 1852 to 1856 he studied chemistry at the Universität Dorpat (today Tartu, central Estonia) with a master's degree in 1856, where he synthesized fuchsine in the master's thesis (published in Liebigs Annalen). He then trained from 1858 to 1862 in Germany, France and Great Britain with leading chemists and in 1862 became Professor of Chemistry at the Szkoła Główna Warszawska in Warsaw. In 1856 he found two new urea syntheses.

He gave up his professorship in 1866 to join the family bank (Bank Handlowy, today after the merger citi-Handlowy.) He was in the management of various companies (with interests in coal mining, paper, sugar, railroad) and founded, among others, the industrial and agricultural museum (1875).

He died on 14 September 1884 in Warsaw and was buried in the Okopowa Street Jewish Cemetery.

== Literature ==
Professor Jakub Natanson is mentioned in several books:

- Jakub Natanson, by Edmund Trepka, 1955 (in English)
- Winfried R. Pötsch, Annelore Fischer, Wolfgang Müller: Lexikon bedeutender Chemiker (en: Lexicon of eminent chemists ) . Harri Deutsch, Frankfurt am Main/Thun 1989, ISBN 3-8171-1055-3
- The Polish Biographical dictionary, 1905
- Celia S. Heller, On the Edge of Destruction -Jews of Poland between the Two World Wars, ISBN 9780814324943 (p. 36)
- Henryk Kroszczor: Jewish Cemetery in Warsaw. Warsaw: Państwowe Wydawnictwo Naukowe, 1983, p. 20. ISBN 83-01-04304-0
- "Jakub Natanson." The Great Soviet Encyclopedia, 3rd Edition. 1970-1979. The Gale Group, Inc. 25 Nov. 2021

== Publications ==
- Ueber Substituirung der Aldehydradicale im Ammoniak. In: Annalen der Chemie und Pharmacie. 92, 1854, S. 48–59, doi:10.1002/jlac.18540920105.
- Ueber Acetylamin und seine Derivate In: Journal für praktische Chemie, 1856, S. 242 doi:10.1002/prac.18560670156
- Ueber die Anwendung einer Modification der Gay-Lussac'schen Dampfdichtenbestimmungsmethode bei Substanzen mit hohem Siedepunkt. In: Annalen der Chemie und Pharmacie. 98, 1856, S. 301–307, doi:10.1002/jlac.18560980305.
- Empfindlichste Reaction auf Eisen. In: Annalen der Chemie und Pharmacie 130, 1864, S. 246–246, doi:10.1002/jlac.18641300216.
