= PAS diastase stain =

Indicator stain used by pathologists

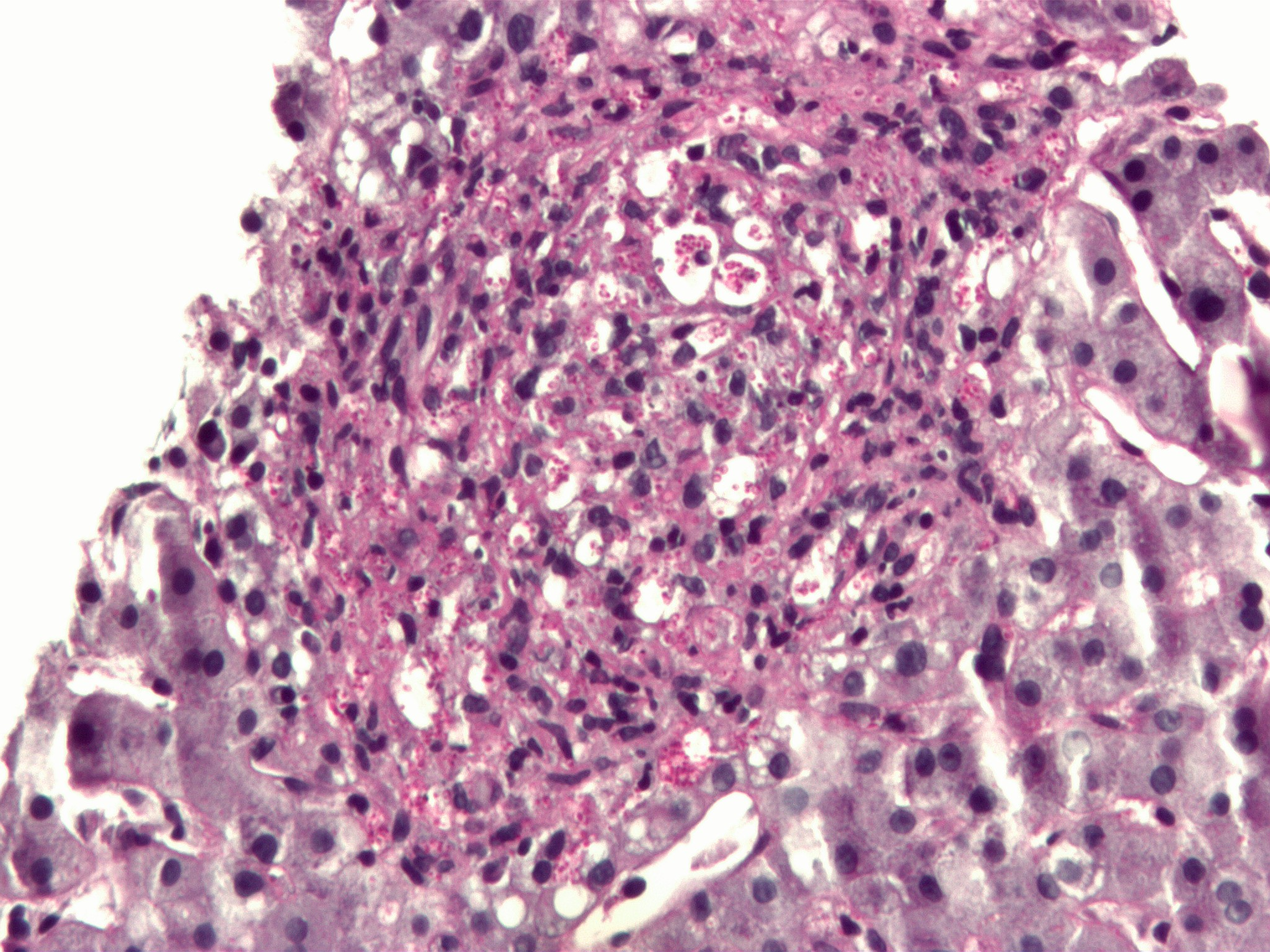
PAS diastase showing Histoplasma in a liver biopsy.

Regular PAS and PAS-D on mucin in a primary mucinous adenocarcinoma of the renal pelvis.

Periodic acid–Schiff–diastase (PAS-D, PAS diastase) stain is a periodic acid–Schiff (PAS) stain used in combination with diastase, an enzyme that breaks down glycogen. PAS-D is a stain often used by pathologists as an ancillary study in making a histologic diagnosis on paraffin-embedded tissue specimens. PAS stain typically gives a magenta color in the presence of glycogen. When PAS and diastase are used together, a light pink color replaces the deep magenta. Differences in the intensities of the two stains (PAS and PAS-D) can be attributed to different glycogen concentrations and can be used to semiquantify glycogen in samples. In practice, the tissue is deparaffinized, the diastase incubates, and the PAS stain is applied.

An example of PAS-D in use is in showing gastric/duodenal metaplasia in duodenal adenomas. PAS diastase stain is also used to identify alpha-1 antitrypsin globules in hepatocytes, which is a characteristic finding of alpha-1 antitrypsin deficiency. PAS diastase stain is also used in diagnosing Whipple’s disease, as the foamy macrophages that infiltrate the lamina propria of the small intestine in this disease possess PAS-positive, diastase-resistant inclusions.

== Additional images ==
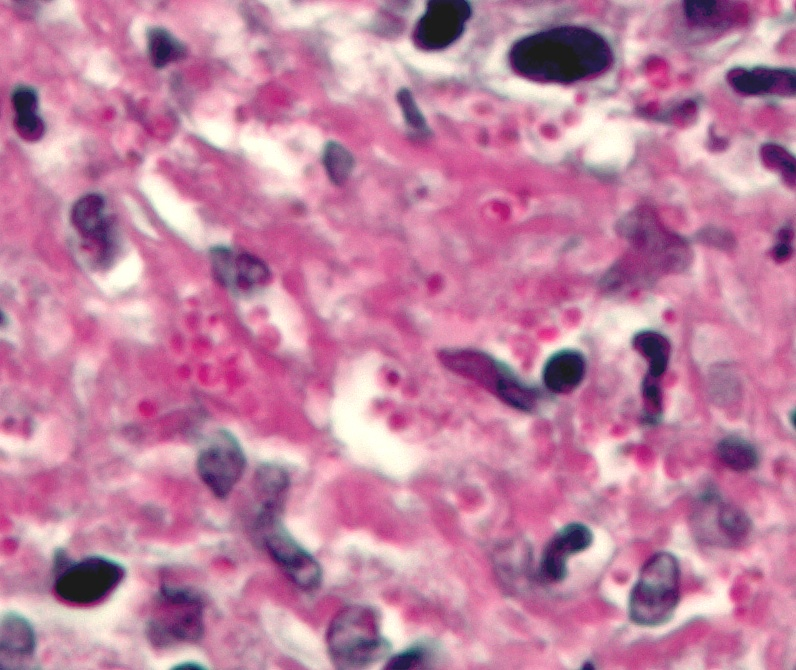
Histoplasma. PAS diastase stain.

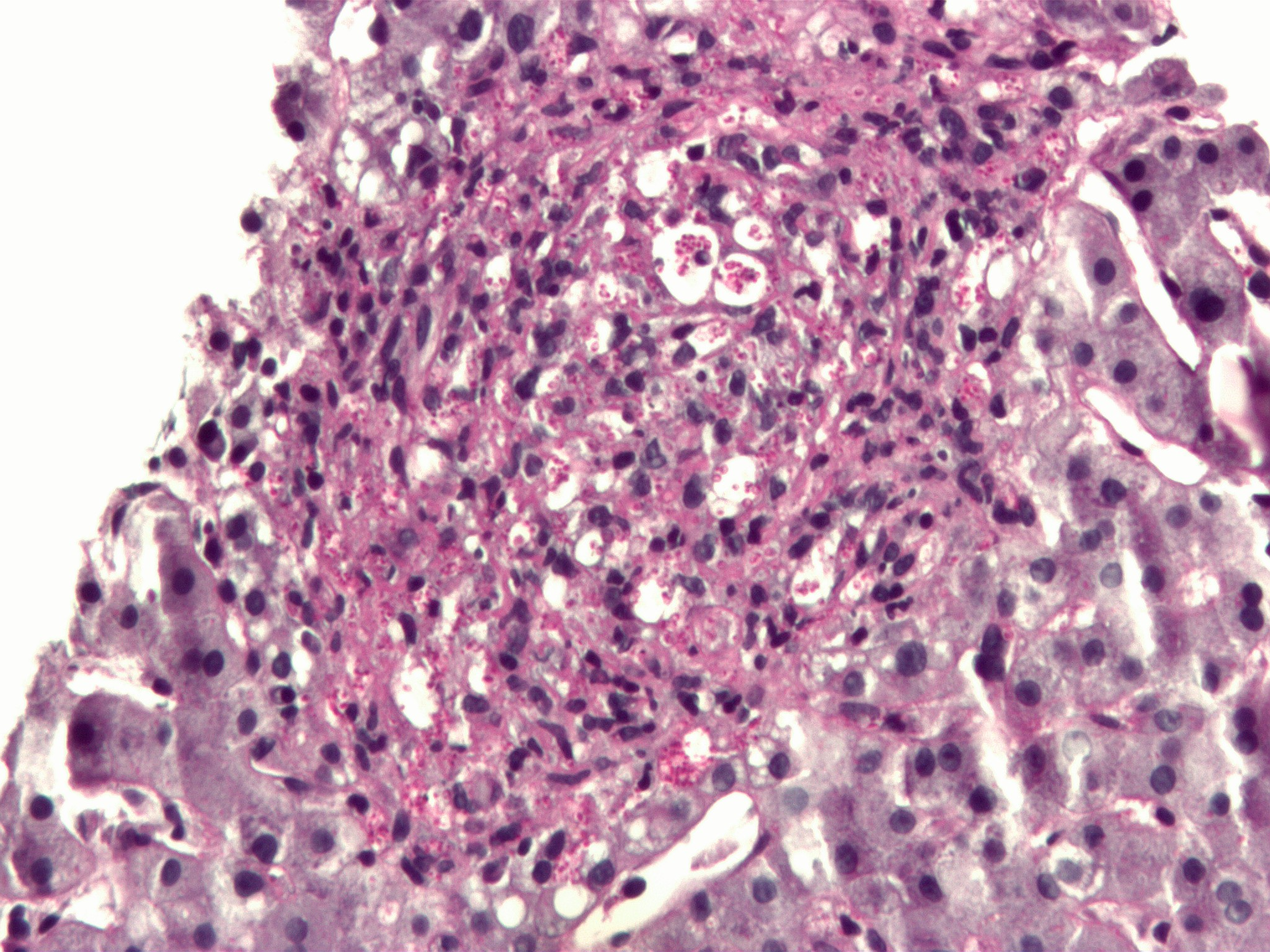
Histoplasma in a granuloma. PAS diastase stain.

== See also ==
- Periodic acid-Schiff stain
- Diastase
