= Schiff test =

Organic chemistry named reaction

- Classification: Colorimetric method
- Analytes: Aldehydes

The structure of the fuchsin dye.

The Schiff test is an early organic chemistry named reaction developed by Hugo Schiff, and is a relatively general chemical test for detection of many organic aldehydes that has also found use in the staining of biological tissues. The Schiff reagent is the reaction product of a dye formulation such as fuchsin and sodium bisulfite; pararosaniline (which lacks an aromatic methyl group) and new fuchsin (which is uniformly mono-methylated ortho to the dye's amine functionalities) are not dye alternatives with comparable detection chemistry.

In its use as a qualitative test for aldehydes, the unknown sample is added to the decolorized Schiff reagent; when aldehyde is present a characteristic magenta color develops. Schiff-type reagents are used for various biological tissue staining methods, e.g. Feulgen stain and periodic acid-Schiff stain. Human skin also contains aldehyde functional groups in the termini of saccharides and so is stained as well.

== Mechanism ==
Fuchsin solutions appear colored due to the visible wavelength absorbance of its central quinoid structure—see also for example viologen —but are "decolorized" upon sulfonation of the dye at its central carbon atom by sulfurous acid or its conjugate base, bisulfite. This reaction disrupts the otherwise favored delocalized extended pi-electron system and resonance in the parent molecule.

The structure of the "decolorized" Schiff reagent.

The further reaction of the Schiff reagent with aldehydes is complex with several research groups reporting multiple reaction products with model compounds. In the currently accepted mechanism, the pararosaniline and bisulfite combine to yield the "decolorized" adduct with sulfonation at the central carbon as described and shown. The free, uncharged aromatic amine groups then react with the aldehyde being tested to form two aldimine groups; these groups have also been named for their discoverer as Schiff bases (azomethines), with the usual carbinolamine (hemiaminal) intermediate being formed and dehydrated en route to the Schiff base. These electrophilic aldimine groups then react with further bisulfite, and the Ar-NH-CH(R)-SO_{3}^{−} product (and other resonance-stabilized species in equilibrium with the product) give rise to the magenta color of a positive test. Prior formation of classical bisulfite adducts of the tested aldehyde may, when the adducts are stable, give rise to false negative tests such as in the case of testing for the aldehydic terminus of glucose. Schiff's reagent on reaction with Acetaldehyde gives pink colour.

Such an imine-mediated mechanism was first proposed by Paul Rumpf (1908–1999) in 1935, and experimental evidence was provided by Hardonk and van Duijn in 1964. In 1980, Robins, Abrams and Pincock provided substantial NMR evidence for the mechanism, leading to its general acceptance. Stoward had examined the mechanism in 1966 and, on the whole, considered this mechanism to be correct.

A second, earlier mechanism continues to appear in the literature. The mechanism was proposed in 1921 by the eminent German organic chemist Heinrich Wieland and his student Georg Scheuing (1895–1949). Bisulphite was believed to react with the available aromatic amine functional groups to form N-sulfinic acid groups, Ar-NH-SO_{2}H, followed by reaction with aldehyde to form sulfonamides, Ar-NH-SO_{2}CH(OH)-R. The 1980 NMR data that allowed visualization of intermediates does not support this mechanism or the sulfonamides as the chromogenic product.

== See also ==
- Tollens' reagent
- Fehling's reagent
- 2,4-Dinitrophenylhydrazine
- Fehling's solution
- Barfoed's test
- Benedict's reagent
