= Lactofuchsin mount =

A Lactofuchsin mount (also spelled Lacto-fuchsin or Lacto-Fuchsin) is a technique used for mounting fungi with hyphae on a microscope slide for examination. The main advantage of a lactofuchsin mount is that if performed correctly, it preserves the structure and arrangement of any hyphae that are present.

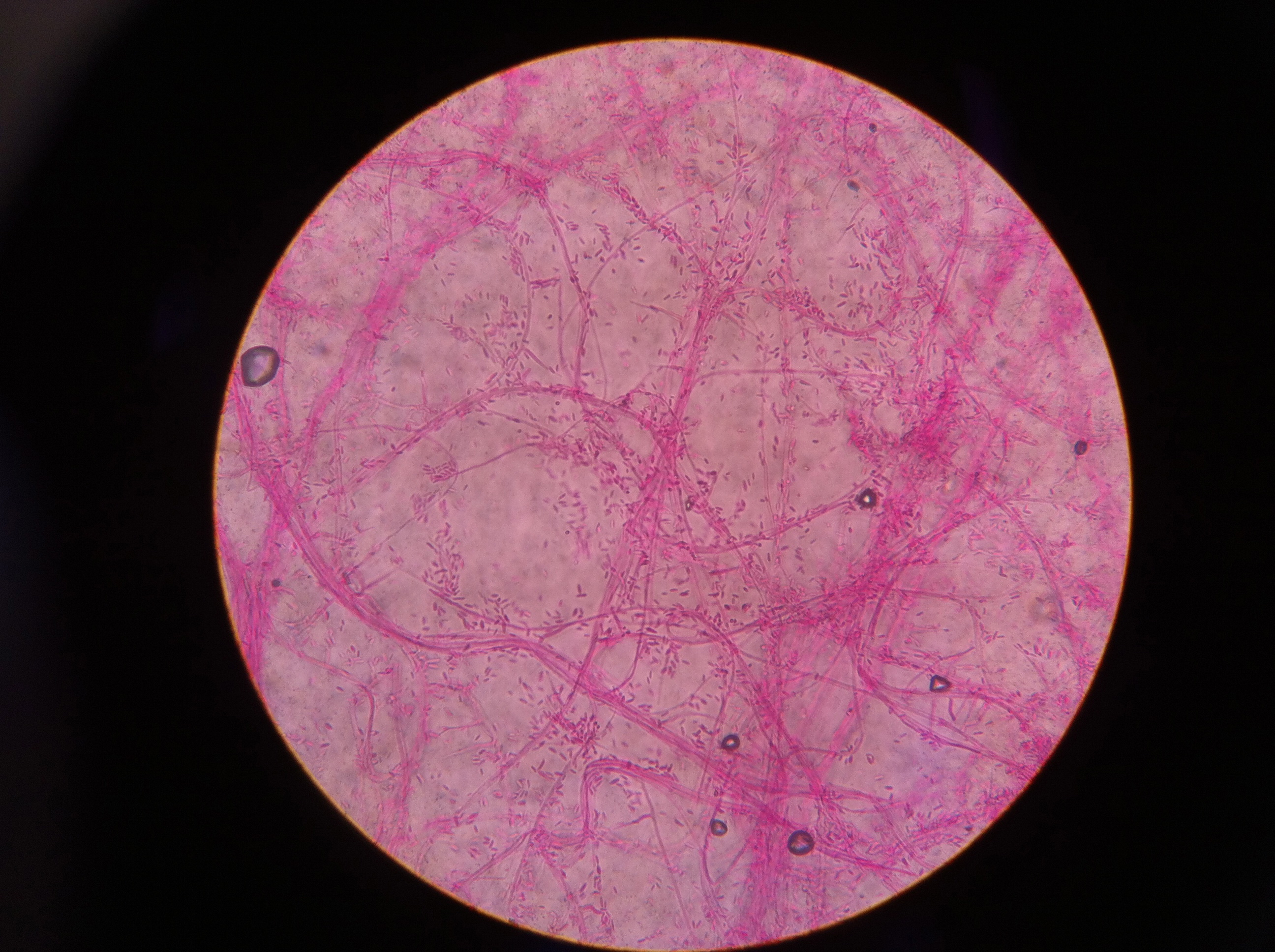
Photograph of a fungus (unidentified) mounted using a Lactofuchsin mount.

== Advantages ==
To examine the hyphae of fungi under a microscope, a wet mount is essential. While this is possible to do with a water based mount, a better result can be obtained with lactofuchsin mounting fluid, which both sticks to the cell walls and colours the cell walls red in the process. Lactofuchsin, a 1% solution of basic fuchsine in lactic acid, dries much slower than water, so the slide may be preserved for a longer period, particularly if the edges of the finished slide are sealed, for example with clear nail polish. In addition, the refractive index of the fluid is significantly different to that of the cell walls, which provides a stronger visual contrast of the cell walls against the background.

== Disadvantages ==
A significant disadvantage of Lactofuchsin is its cost; prices are over US$100 for a small 20mL bottle. Only a few drops are used for each mount. Lactofuchsin is poisonous.
