= Pararosaniline =

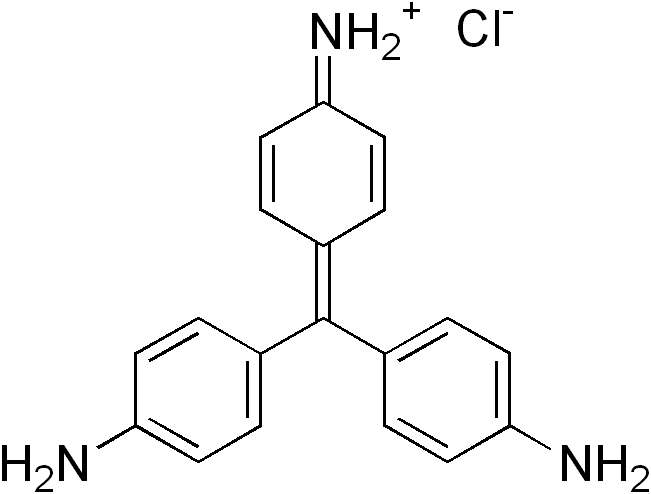

Names
- IUPAC name [4-[Bis(4-aminophenyl)methylidene]-1-cyclohexa-2,5-dienylidene]dianiline
- Other names Pararosaniline p-rosaniline C.I. 42500; Para magenta

Identifiers
CAS Number	479-73-2; 569-61-9 (HCl)
3D model (JSmol)	Interactive image
ChEBI	CHEBI:87663
ChemSpider	10819
ECHA InfoCard	100.106.992
KEGG	C19210
PubChem CID	11293
UNII	20N4C0M8NM; 444C2M8JKN (HCl)
CompTox Dashboard (EPA)	DTXSID5043845
- InChI: InChI=1S/C19H17N3/c20-16-7-1-13(2-8-16)19(14-3-9-17(21)10-4-14)15-5-11-18(22)12-6-15/h1-12,20H,21-22H2 Key: AFAIELJLZYUNPW-UHFFFAOYSA-N; InChI=1/C19H17N3/c20-16-7-1-13(2-8-16)19(14-3-9-17(21)10-4-14)15-5-11-18(22)12-6-15/h1-12,20H,21-22H2 Key: AFAIELJLZYUNPW-UHFFFAOYAS
- SMILES: c1cc(ccc1C(=C2C=CC(=N)C=C2)c3ccc(cc3)N)N

Properties
Chemical formula	C_{19}H_{17}N_{3}
Molar mass	287.36 g/mol; 323.83 g/mol (HCl)
Appearance	Green crystalline solid
Melting point	268 to 270 °C (514 to 518 °F; 541 to 543 K) decomposes
Solubility in water	Slightly soluble

Hazards
Safety data sheet (SDS)	External MSDS
- Except where otherwise noted, data are given for materials in their standard state (at 25 °C [77 °F], 100 kPa). verify (what is ?) Infobox references

Pararosaniline, pararosaniline free base, Basic Red 9, or C.I. 42500 is an organic compound with the formula (H_{2}NC_{6}H_{4})_{2}C=(C_{6}H_{4}NH). It is the free base form of pararosaniline hydrochloride, [(H_{2}NC_{6}H_{4})_{3}C]^{+}Cl^{−}, a magenta solid with a variety of uses as a dye. It is one of the four components of basic fuchsine. It is structurally related to other triarylmethane dyes called methyl violets (e.g. crystal violet) which feature methyl groups on nitrogen.

It is prepared by the condensation of aniline and p-aminobenzaldehyde. Alternatively, it arises from the oxidation of 4,4'-bis(aminophenyl)methane in the presence of aniline.

== Uses ==
- It is used to dye polyacrylonitrile fibers.
- It is used to detect sulfur dioxide.
- Pararosaniline is used as a colorimetric test for aldehydes, in the Schiff test. It is the only basic fuchsine component suitable for making the aldehyde-fuchsine stain for pancreatic islet beta cells.
- It has use as an antischistosomal.

== Related compounds ==
- 4,4'-Thiodianiline
- 4,4'-Methylenedianiline
- 4,4'-Oxydianiline
- Dapsone
