= Fuchsine =

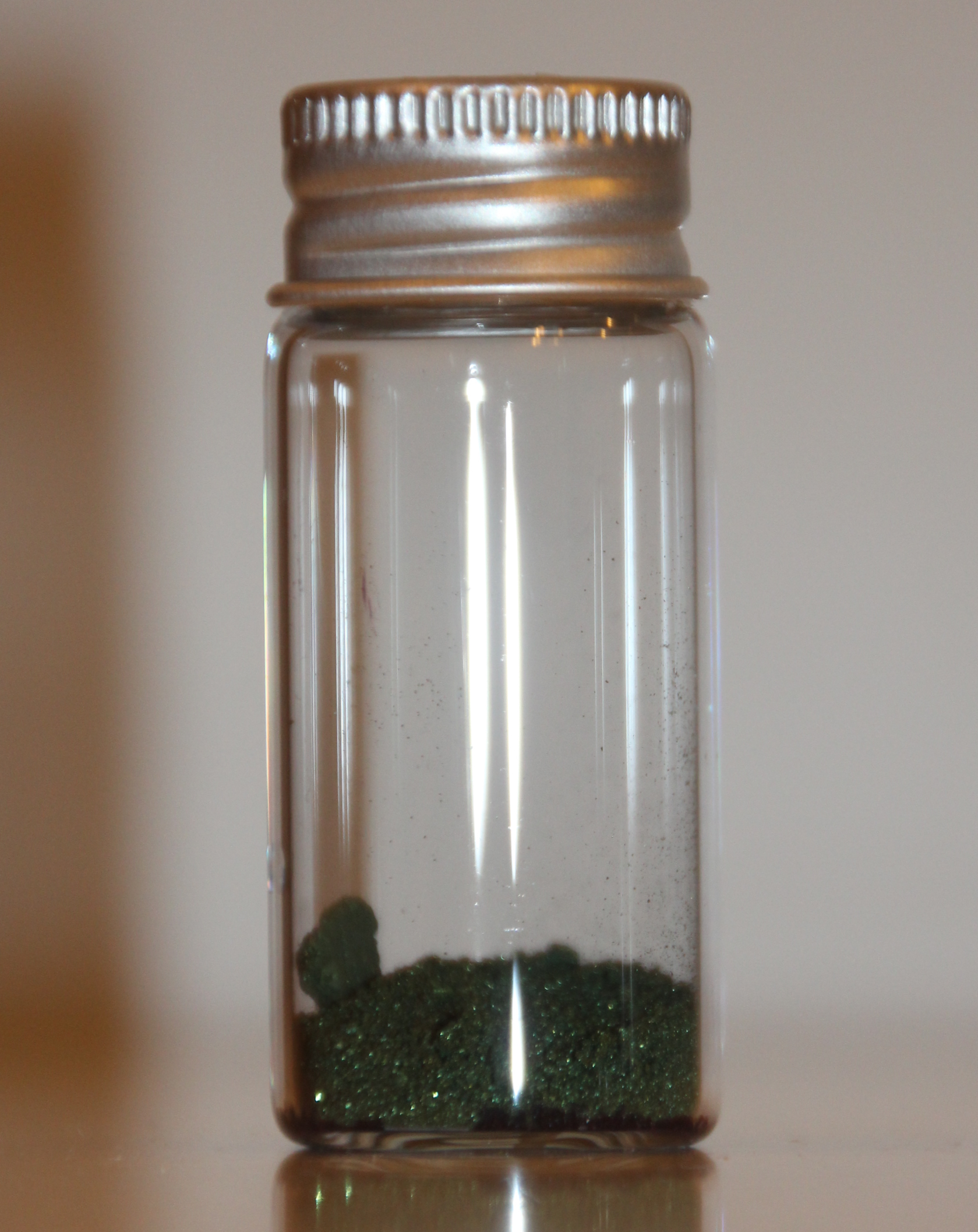
Solid Basic Fuchsine
Solid basic fuchsine
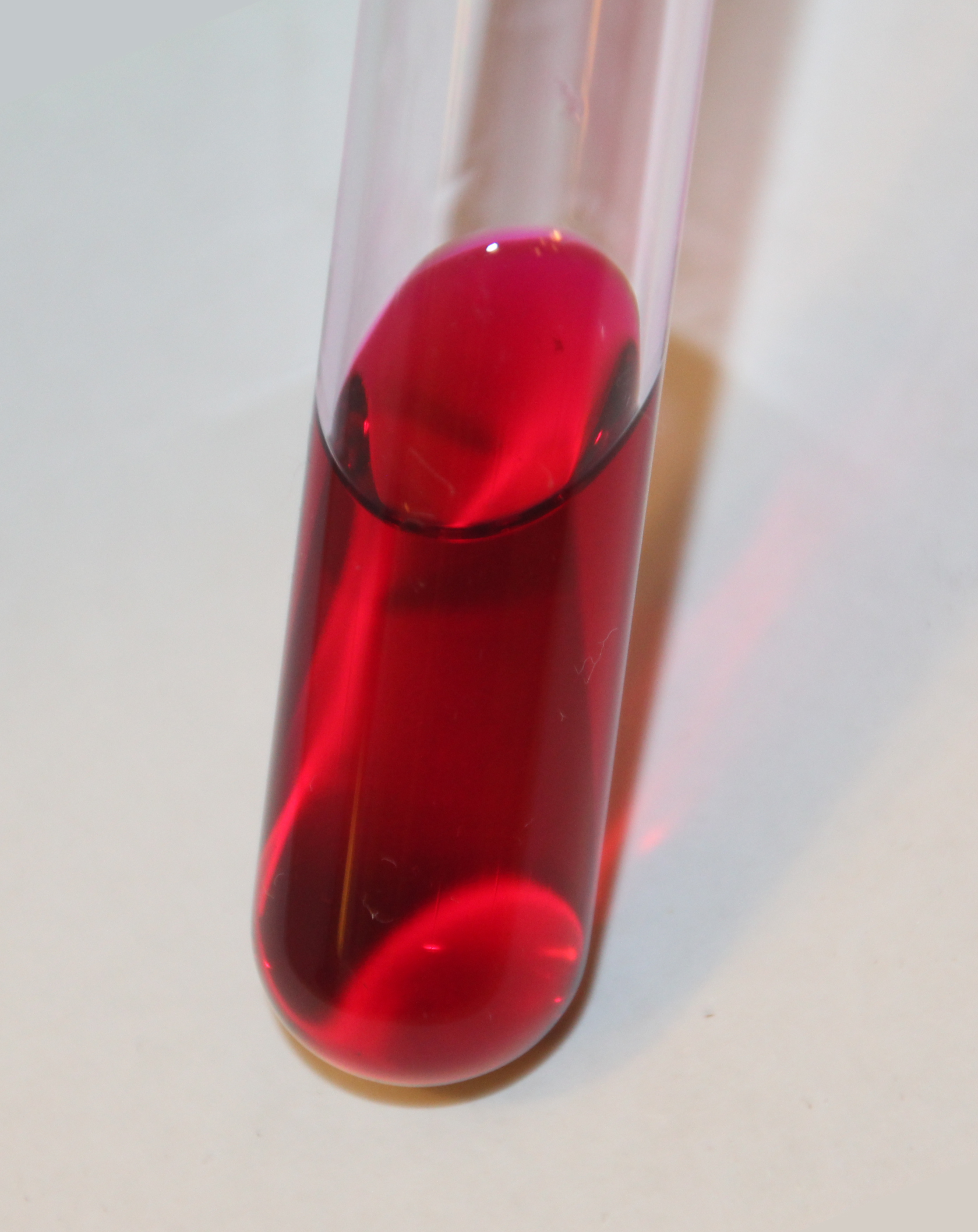
Basic Fuchsine in aqueous solution
Basic fuchsine in aqueous solution

Names
- IUPAC name 4-[(4-Aminophenyl)-(4-imino-1-cyclohexa-2,5-dienylidene)methyl]aniline hydrochloride

Identifiers
CAS Number	632-99-5
3D model (JSmol)	Interactive image
ChEBI	CHEBI:87665
ChEMBL	ChEMBL1979636
ChemSpider	10468578
ECHA InfoCard	100.010.173
EC Number	209-321-2
KEGG	C19252
PubChem CID	12447
RTECS number	8053-09-6
UNII	8UUC89LHB2
CompTox Dashboard (EPA)	DTXSID6021246
- InChI: InChI=1S/C20H19N3.ClH/c1-13-12-16(6-11-19(13)23)20(14-2-7-17(21)8-3-14)15-4-9-18(22)10-5-15;/h2-12,21H,22-23H2,1H3;1H/b20-14-,21-17?; Key: NIKFYOSELWJIOF-SVFFXJIWSA-N; InChI=1/C20H19N3.ClH/c1-13-12-16(6-11-19(13)23)20(14-2-7-17(21)8-3-14)15-4-9-18(22)10-5-15;/h2-12,21H,22-23H2,1H3;1H/b20-14-,21-17?; Key: NIKFYOSELWJIOF-SVFFXJIWBQ
- SMILES: [Cl-].[NH2+]=C\1/C=C\C(C=C/1)=C(\c2ccc(N)c(C)c2)c3ccc(N)cc3

Properties
Chemical formula	C_{20}H_{19}N_{3}·HCl
Molar mass	337.86 g/mol (hydrochloride)
Appearance	Dark green powder
Melting point	200 °C (392 °F; 473 K)
Solubility in water	2650 mg/L (25 °C (77 °F))
log P	1.36 to 1.632
Vapor pressure	7.49×10^{−10} mmHg (25 °C)
Henry's law constant (k_{H})	2.28×10^{−15} atm⋅m^{3}/mole (25 °C)
Atmospheric OH rate constant	4.75×10^{−10} cm^{3}/molecule⋅sec (25 °C)

Hazards
- Occupational safety and health (OHS/OSH)
Main hazards	Ingestion, inhalation, skin and eye contact, combustible at high temperature, slightly explosive around open flames and sparks.
NFPA 704 (fire diamond)	2 1 0
- Except where otherwise noted, data are given for materials in their standard state (at 25 °C [77 °F], 100 kPa). verify (what is ?) Infobox references

Fuchsine (sometimes spelled fuchsin) or rosaniline hydrochloride is a magenta dye with chemical formula C_{20}H_{19}N_{3}·HCl. There are other similar chemical formulations of products sold as fuchsine, and several dozen other synonyms of this molecule.

It becomes magenta when dissolved in water; as a solid, it forms dark green crystals. As well as dying textiles, fuchsine is used to stain bacteria and sometimes as a disinfectant. In the literature of biological stains the name of this dye is frequently misspelled, with omission of the terminal -e, which indicates an amine. American and English dictionaries (Webster's, Oxford, Chambers, etc.) give the correct spelling, which is also used in the literature of industrial dyeing. It is well established that production of fuchsine results in development of bladder cancers by production workers. Production of magenta is listed as a circumstance known to result in cancer.

== History ==
Fuchsine was first created by Jakub Natanson in 1856 from aniline and 1,2-Dichloroethane. In 1858 August Wilhelm von Hofmann obtained it from aniline and carbon tetrachloride. François-Emmanuel Verguin discovered the substance independently of Hofmann the same year and patented it. Fuchsine was named by its original manufacturer Renard frères et Franc, is usually cited with one of two etymologies: from the color of the flowers of the plant genus Fuchsia, named in honor of botanist Leonhart Fuchs, or as the German translation Fuchs of the French name Renard, which means fox. An 1861 article in Répertoire de Pharmacie said that the name was chosen for both reasons.

== Usage ==
In the 21st century, it remains useful for biological chemistry, particularly for detecting glycogenic material.

Historically, after its discovery it became widely-used in the textile industry in the late 1800s and 1900s for dyeing fabrics pink, and also for dyeing foodstuffs, particularly red wine, despite health concerns.

== Acid fuchsine ==
Acid fuchsine is a mixture of homologues of basic fuchsine, modified by addition of sulfonic groups. While this yields twelve possible isomers, all of them are satisfactory despite slight differences in their properties.

== Basic fuchsine ==
Basic fuchsine is a mixture of rosaniline, pararosaniline, new fuchsine and magenta II. Formulations usable for making of Schiff reagent must have high content of pararosanilin. The actual composition of basic fuchsine tends to somewhat vary by vendor and batch, making the batches differently suitable for different purposes.

In solution with phenol (also called carbolic acid) as an accentuator it is called carbol fuchsin and is used for the Ziehl–Neelsen and other similar acid-fast staining of the mycobacteria which cause tuberculosis, leprosy etc. Basic fuchsine is widely used in biology to stain the nucleus, and is also a component of Lactofuchsin, used for Lactofuchsin mounting.

== Properties ==
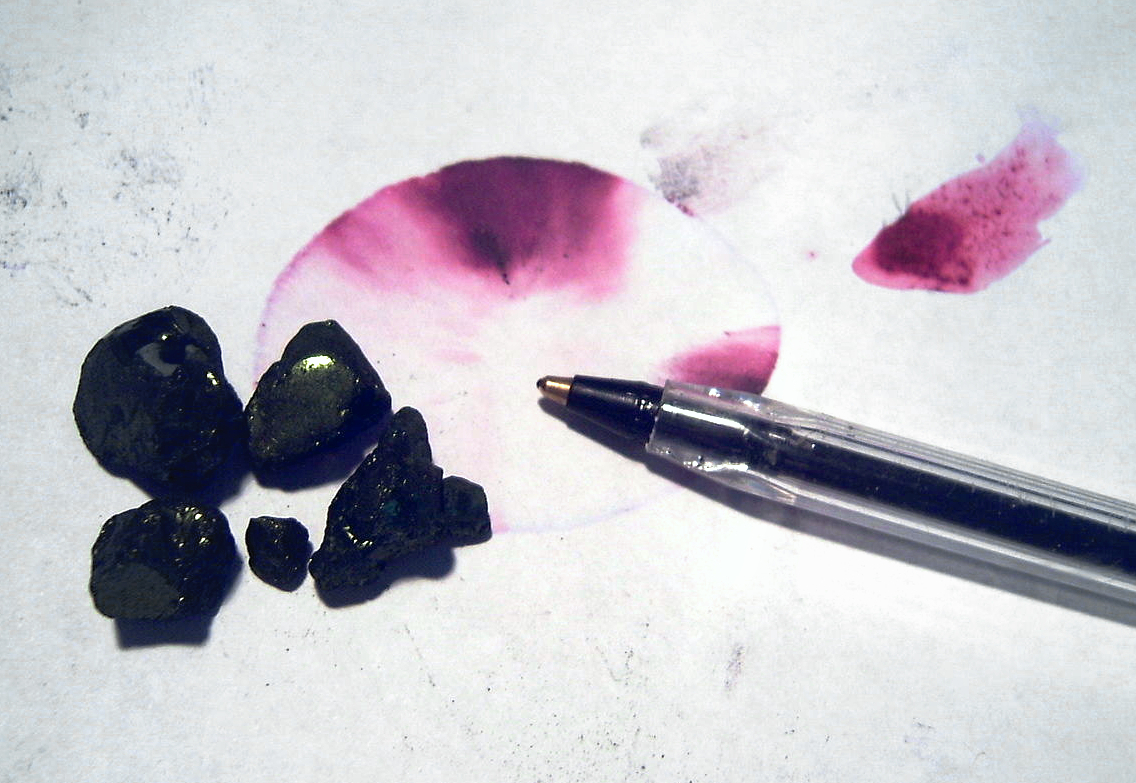
Basic fuchsine pieces. The two magenta stains on the paper were made by placing one drop of ethanol-water azeotrope, centre, and water, right, on the streaks remaining on the paper after the 'crystals' were removed. The 'crystals' were then replaced and the photograph taken.

The crystals pictured at the right are of basic fuchsine, also known as basic violet 14, basic red 9, pararosaniline or CI 42500. Their structure differs from the structure shown above by the absence of the methyl group on the upper ring, otherwise they are quite similar.

They are soft, with a hardness of less than 1, about the same as or less than talc. They possess a strong metallic lustre and a green yellow color. They leave dark greenish streaks on paper and when these are moistened with a solvent, the strong magenta colour appears.

== Chemical structure ==
Fuchsine is an amine salt and has three amine groups, two primary amines and a secondary amine. If one of these is protonated to form ABCNH^{+}, the positive charge is delocalized across the whole symmetrical molecule due to pi cloud electron movement.

The positive charge can be thought of as residing on the central carbon atom and all three "wings" becoming identical aromatic rings terminated by a primary amine group. Other resonance structures can be conceived, where the positive charge "moves" from one amine group to the next, or one third of the positive charge resides on each amine group. The ability of fuchsine to be protonated by a stronger acid gives it its basic property. The positive charge is neutralized by the negative charge on the chloride ion. The positive "basic fuchsinium ions" and negative chloride ions stack to form the salt "crystals" depicted above.

== See also ==
- New fuchsine and Acid fuchsine are related dyes
- Fuchsine is a component in the Schiff test
- Fuchsine is now often used in the Gram stain procedure in microbiology.
- Basic Fuchsine is a component in the Lactofuchsin mount
