= Trichrome staining =

Histological staining method

Trichrome staining is a histological staining method that uses two or more acid dyes in conjunction with a polyacid. Staining differentiates tissues by tinting them in contrasting colours. It increases the contrast of microscopic features in cells and tissues, which makes them easier to see when viewed through a microscope.

The word trichrome means "three colours". The first staining protocol that was described as "trichrome" was Mallory's trichrome stain, which differentially stained erythrocytes to a red colour, muscle tissue to a red colour, and collagen to a blue colour. Some other trichrome staining protocols are the Masson's trichrome stain, Lillie's trichrome, and the Gömöri trichrome stain.

== Purpose ==
Without trichrome staining, discerning one feature from another can be extremely difficult. Smooth muscle tissue, for example, is hard to differentiate from collagen. A trichrome stain can colour the muscle tissue red, and the collagen fibres green or blue. Liver biopsies may have fine collagen fibres between the liver cells, and the amount of collagen may be estimated based on the staining method. Trichrome methods are now used for differentiating muscle from collagen, pituitary alpha cells from beta cells, fibrin from collagen, and mitochondria in fresh frozen muscle sections, among other applications. It helps in identifying increases in collagenous tissue (i.e., fibrotic changes) such as in liver cirrhosis and distinguishing tumours arising from muscle cells and fibroblasts.

== Procedure ==
Trichrome staining techniques employ two or more acid dyes. Normally acid dyes would stain the same basic proteins, but by applying them sequentially the staining pattern can be manipulated. A polyacid (such as phosphomolybdic acid or Phosphotungstic acid) is used to remove dye selectively. Polyacids are thought to behave as dyes with a high molecular weight: they displace easily removed dye from collagen.

Usually a red dye in dilute acetic acid is applied first to overstain all components. Then a polyacid is applied to remove the red dye from collagen and some other components by displacement. A second acid dye (blue or green) in dilute acetic acid is applied which, in turn, displaces the polyacid, resulting in collagen stained in a contrasting colour to the initial dye used. If erythrocytes are to be stained, a small molecular weight yellow or orange dye is applied before staining with the red dye. It is usually applied from a saturated solution in 80% ethanol and often in conjunction with picric acid (itself a dye) and a polyacid. The methods exploit minor differences in tissue reaction to dyes, density, accessibility and so on.

Trichrome stains in which dyes and a polyacid are applied sequentially are called multi-step trichromes. In "one-step" methods, all the dyes—with or without a polyacid—are combined in a single solution. One of the oldest single-step approaches to trichrome staining is van Gieson's method, which stains muscle and cytoplasm yellow, and collagen red. Another is the Gömöri trichrome stain, which closely mimics Masson's trichrome. In "yellowsolve" methods, a red dye in dilute acetic acid is first applied, then the section is very thoroughly dehydrated to ensure that no moisture remains. The red dye is then displaced by a yellow dye in a solvent, such as cellosolve (2-ethoxy-ethanol). The name yellowsolve is a blend of the terms yellow and cellosolve. Lendrum's phloxine-tartrazine for cell inclusions is one example of a yellowsolve stain.

== Dyes ==
Among the dyes used for trichrome staining are:

Red
Acid fuchsin, xylidine ponceau, chromotrope 2R, Biebrich scarlet, ponceau 6R, phloxine
Blue and green
Light green SF yellowish, Fast Green FCF, methyl blue, water blue
Yellow
Picric acid, orange G, Martius yellow, tartrazine, milling yellow

== See also ==
- Dispersion staining
- Microscopy
- Phase-contrast microscopy
