= Lake Willastein Park =

Park in Arkansas, United States

- Interactive map of Lake Willastein Park
- Type: Public
- Location: Maumelle, Arkansas
- Coordinates: 34.852°N 92.412°W
- Area: ~100 acres
- Operator: City of Maumelle Parks and Recreation Department
- Open: sunrise-sunset
- Hiking trails: Lake Willastein Loop (2.1 miles)

Lake Willastein Park, commonly referred to as Willastein Park, is a roughly 100-acre public park located in Maumelle, Arkansas, roughly 20 miles northwest of Little Rock, Arkansas.

== History ==
The park occupies land that was originally acquired by the U.S. Government via eminent domain in 1941. War Department contracts were signed, and ground was broken on September 2, 1941, to build the 7,613-acre Maumelle Ordnance Works, with the mission of producing and storing picric acid and ammonium picrate explosives in 21 reinforced-concrete bunkers measuring 61ft high and 27ft wide. Their bunkers would have capacity for 75,000 lbs. of chemicals, which would increase by 50% in March 1942. The storage facility was completed in May 1942, reaching full capacity by the end of the year. The chemicals stored and produced at the facility would be used for high-explosive bombs and artillery shells for many branches of the military and their allies. During the war, engineers would build a small reservoir along a local creek to store runoff fresh water.

The site would operate until August 15, 1945, with production ending around this time. Of the nearly two-dozen bunkers built, only three survive to this day including Bunker No. 4 which is listed on the National Register of Historic Places. On September 13, 1945, approximately 2,300 acres were transferred to the Federal Land Bank while the remaining land was transferred to the Army Corps of Engineers, who would subsequently declare the land a surplus in 1959. The approximately 5,200 acres of surplus land would be sold to Perry Equipment Company in 1961, under contract to conduct salvage and decontamination operations the area. A number of bunkers would serve as temporary training aids for municipal fire departments before being demolished.

== Conversion to a park ==
In 1966, the town of Maumelle was set to be established as one of the thirteen new towns to be federally funded under the "New Town" Projects, with the idea of providing Little Rock with a new metropolitan area. Jess P. Odom would purchase the property and along with Maumelle Land Development for $1.01 million with the idea of developing the property into a recreation area. The site would be repurposed for public green space in the early 1970s and developed into a public park to serve the growing number of families in the town. Today, the park features a small lake (Lake Willastein), a walking loop, and picnic areas.

The park serves as a protected habitat for a number of animal species, including:

- Armadillos
- Crappie
- Deer
- Ducks
- Eagles
- Geese
- Heron
- Largemouth bass
- Turtles
