= Potassium picrate =

Names
- Preferred IUPAC name Potassium 2,4,6-trinitrophenoxide
- Other names Potassium 2,4,6-trinitrophenolate; Picric acid, potassium salt

Identifiers
CAS Number	573-83-1
3D model (JSmol)	Interactive image
ChemSpider	61732
ECHA InfoCard	100.008.511
EC Number	209-361-0
PubChem CID	68454
UNII	I7I1601L00
CompTox Dashboard (EPA)	DTXSID5060354
- InChI: InChI=1S/C6H3N3O7.K/c10-6-4(8(13)14)1-3(7(11)12)2-5(6)9(15)16;/h1-2,10H;/q;+1/p-1 Key: RBGOCSKFMWMTRZ-UHFFFAOYSA-M; InChI=1/C6H3N3O7.K/c10-6-4(8(13)14)1-3(7(11)12)2-5(6)9(15)16;/h1-2,10H;/q;+1/p-1 Key: RBGOCSKFMWMTRZ-REWHXWOFAJ
- SMILES: c1c(cc(c(c1[N+](=O)[O-])[O-])[N+](=O)[O-])[N+](=O)[O-].[K+]

Properties
Chemical formula	C_{6}H_{2}KN_{3}O_{7}; C_{6}H_{2}(NO_{2})_{3}OK
Molar mass	267.194 g/mol
Density	1.852 g/cm3
Melting point	250 °C (482 °F; 523 K)
Boiling point	Detonates at 331 °C before boiling

Hazards
- Occupational safety and health (OHS/OSH)
Main hazards	Explosive and toxic
- GHS labelling
Pictograms	(GHS01: Explosive) (GHS06: Toxic)
Signal word	Danger
Hazard statements	H200, H301, H311, H331
Precautionary statements	P201, P202, P261, P264, P270, P271, P280, P281, P301+P310, P302+P352, P304+P340, P311, P312, P321, P322, P330, P361, P363, P372, P373, P380, P401, P403+P233, P405, P501
- Except where otherwise noted, data are given for materials in their standard state (at 25 °C [77 °F], 100 kPa). verify (what is ?) Infobox references

Potassium picrate, or potassium 2,4,6-trinitrophenolate, is an organic chemical, a picrate of potassium. It is a reddish yellow or green crystalline material. It is a primary explosive. Anhydrous potassium picrate forms orthorhombic crystals.

== History ==
Potassium picrate was first prepared in impure form in the mid 17th century by Johann Rudolf Glauber by dissolving wood in nitric acid and neutralizing with potassium carbonate. It is commonly made by neutralizing picric acid with potassium carbonate. It has been used in industry since the 1860s.

Potassium Picrate and picric acid were formerly used in pyrotechnics to produce whistle effects, but since mixes that don't involve primary explosives have since been developed it is no longer used in that industry. Its chief applications were as a component of explosives (with potassium nitrate and charcoal), propellants (with the same substances in the poudre Dessignole of the 1870s French Navy), and in explosive primers (with lead picrate and potassium chlorate).

== Description ==
Potassium picrate is not a very powerful explosive. It is somewhat shock-sensitive. In contact with flame it deflagrates with a loud sound. If ignited in confined space, it will detonate. It is more sensitive than picric acid.

In contact with metals (e.g. lead, calcium, iron), potassium picrate, like ammonium picrate and picric acid, forms picrates of said metals. These are often more dangerous and more sensitive explosives. Contact with such materials therefore should be prevented.

Potassium picrate is used to determine the concentration of nonionic surfactants in water; materials detectable by this method are called potassium picrate active substances (PPAS).

== Synthesis ==
As with other picrates, potassium picrate may be produced by the neutralization of picric acid with the corresponding carbonate. As picric acid is barely soluble in water the reaction must be done in an appropriate solvent like methanol. First dissolving the picric acid in methanol and then adding potassium carbonate will result in potassium picrate. Temperature control is important to prevent detonation or excessive methanol evaporation.

== Sensitivity ==
According to Urbanski, Potassium picrate detonated 10% of the time when struck by a mass of 2kg dropped from the height of 21cm. By comparison, the more sensitive anhydrous lead picrate detonated 10% of the time when struck by the same mass dropped from the height of 2cm.

== See also ==
- Dunnite
- Picric acid
- Lead picrate
