= Lillie's trichrome =

Lillie's trichrome is a combination of dyes used in histology.

It is similar to Masson's trichrome stain, but it uses Biebrich scarlet for the plasma stain and aniline blue for the fiber stain. It was initially published by Ralph D. Lillie in 1940. It is applied by submerging the fixated sample into the following three solutions: Weigert's iron hematoxylin working solution, Biebrich scarlet solution, and Fast Green FCF solution.

The resulting stains are black cell nuclei, brown cytoplasm, red muscle and myelinated fibers, blue collagen, and scarlet erythrocytes.

== Applications ==
Trichrome stains are normally used to differentiate between collagen and muscle tissues. Some studies that benefit from its application include end stage liver disease (cirrhosis), myocardial infarction, muscular dystrophy, and tumor analysis.
