= Van Gieson's stain =

Histological stain to highlight collagen

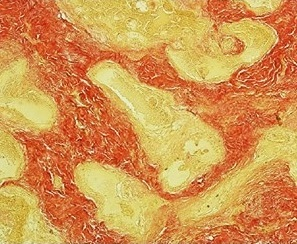
Van Gieson's stain in angioleiomyoma, showing smooth muscle fibers yellow and collagen fibers red.

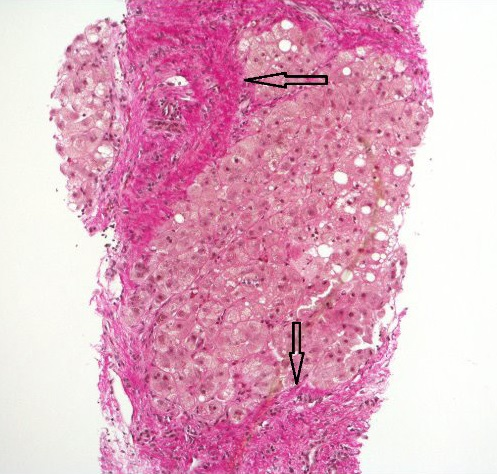
Hematoxylin and Van Gieson's stain gives collagen a pink color, such as in fibrosis (arrows, here in cirrhosis).

Van Gieson's stain is a histological staining technique used to differentiate between collagen and other tissue elements in microscopic sections. It is a combination of two Acidic dye - picric acid and acid fuchsin, producing distinct coloration that aids in the visualization of connective tissue.

When examining histological specimens, it colors collagen fibers bright red while staining muscle and other cytoplasmic elements yellow. It was introduced in the late 19th century to histology by American psychiatrist and neuropathologist Ira Van Gieson. Van Gieson’s solution is commonly used as a counterstain in histology, sharply highlighting collagen against a yellow background.

== History ==
Van Gieson’s stain was first described by Ira T. Van Gieson in 1889 as a method for examining nervous system tissue. Van Gieson was a pathologist who published The Laboratory notes of technical methods for the nervous system in 1889, introducing the picric–fuchsin method at that time. In early 20th century the stain was combined with other techniques. In 1908, Friedrich hermann verhoeff introduced an iron–hematoxylin stain for elastic fibers, which used with Van Gieson’s counterstain to form the Verhoeff–Van Gieson (VVG) stain. In VVG staining, elastic fibers are stained black (by Verhoeff’s hematoxylin), collagen appears red (by Van Gieson), and cytoplasm elements are yellow.

== Staining Mechanism ==
Van Gieson’s stain is an acidic dye mixture. It utilizes the different affinities of its two components for tissue proteins. Acid fuchsin is a large poly-ionic dye (a sulfonated triphenylmethane) that strongly binds to collagen fibers in a strongly acidic solution, while picric acid (a small trinitrophenol molecule) penetrates and binds more to cytoplasmic proteins and muscle. Additionally, Picric acid provides the acidic pH necessary for the stain mechanism. Van Gieson stain essentially differentiates cytoplasm and muscle from collagen. Mechanistic studies suggest that acid fuchsin molecules bind to collagen mainly via hydrogen bonds, collagen’s triple-helix stays relatively open during and after dye-binding. Meanwhile, picric acid binds more via hydrophobic and ionic interactions in dense cytoplasmic protein networks. In practice, tissue sections are often first stained with an iron hematoxylin for nuclei, then with Van Gieson solution.

== Applications in histology and pathology ==
Van Gieson’s stain is widely used to as a counterstain to evaluate connective tissue in both histology research and pathology. In medical liver biopsies, Hematoxylin–Van Gieson (HVG) stain is used to visualize the extent of fibrosis, as collagen appears bright pink/red. When used after Verhoeff’s elastic stain it reveals elastic fibers (stain black) and collagen (stain red). It differentiates between collagen and elastic fibers in tumor stroma. It is often used in general pathology to stain collagen and other connective tissues. as a quick “connective tissue” stain.

== Related stain ==
Van Gieson’s solution is frequently used in combination with other stains for greater information. In the Hematoxylin–Van Gieson (HVG) method, an iron hematoxylin is applied first, staining nuclei dark blue, followed by Van Gieson’s solution. This results in dark nuclei, red collagen, and yellow cytoplasmic elements. In the Verhoeff–Van Gieson (VVG) stain, Verhoeff’s iron-hematoxylin (containing ferric chloride and iodine) is used first to stain elastic fibers black, then Van Gieson’s counterstain colors collagen red and cytoplasm yellow.

== Limitations ==
Like other staining methods, Van Gieson’s stain has limitations. It may miss very thin collagen fibrils, immature collagen can be faint or invisible with this stain. This can lead to an underestimation of collagen content. The red coloration can also fade if slides are not properly fixed or stored. The usage of the picric acid–acid fuchsin mixture tends to remove or significantly weaken majority of hematoxylin, resulting in nuclei that are faint or nearly invisible under the microscope.To overcome this, an iron-mordanted hematoxylin, such as Weigert’s hematoxylin, is typically used. Iron hematoxylins are more resistant to acid decolorization and preserve nuclear detail even after exposure to Van Gieson's solution.
