= Fluoro-jade stain =

Fluoro-jade B positive neurons in the rat cortex after injection of kainic acid

Fluoro-jade stain is a fluorochrome derived from fluorescein, and is commonly used in neuroscience disciplines to label degenerating neurons in ex vivo tissue of the central nervous system. The first fluoro-jade derivative was reported by Larry Schmued in 1997 as an alternative method from traditional methods for labeling degenerating neurons such as silver nitrate staining, H&E stain, or Nissl stain. Fluoro-jade may be preferred to other degenerative stains due to simplicity of staining procedures and visual interpretation, which are common drawbacks of conventional degenerative stains. However, the mechanism by which fluoro-jade labels degenerating neurons is unknown thus creating some controversy to the actual physiological condition of the labeled cells.

== Chemical properties ==
Currently, there are three fluoro-jade dyes (fluoro-jade, fluoro-jade B, and fluoro-jade C), all of which are anionic derivatives of fluorescein and highly acidic. Specifically, fluoro-jade is a mixture of 5-carboxyfluorescein and 6-carboxyfluorescein disodium salts, whereas fluoro-jade B is a mixture of (1) trisodium 5-(6-hydroxy-3-oxo-3H-xanthen-9yl)benzene, 1,2,4 tricarboxylic acid, (2) disodium 2-(6-hydroxy-3-oxo-3H-xanthen-9yl)-5-(2,4-dihydroxybenzol)terephthalic acid, and (3) disodium 2,5-bis(6-hydroxy-3-oxo-3H-xanthen-9yl)terephthalic acid. All three fluoro-jade species have similar excitation and emission profiles as fluorescein (excitation: 495 nm; emission:521 nm) and thus can be visualized using a fluorescein/FITC filter. The newer dyes, fluoro-jade B and fluoro-jade C, were developed to improve signal to noise ratio, therefore creating superior compounds for visualizing finer neuronal morphology including dendrites, axons and nerve terminals.

== General staining techniques ==
Nearly all processed tissue is compatible with fluoro-jade stain including tissue from rodents (mice and rats), non-human primates and humans. Mounted tissue is stepwise rehydrated with decreasing concentrations of alcohol. Potassium permanganate may be used to decrease background staining and protect tissue from fading and photo bleaching. Fluoro-jade is highly soluble in water and is therefore first dissolved in distilled water. In order to be specific for degenerating neurons, fluoro-jade must be used in an acidic environment, therefore fluoro-jade is further diluted in glacial acetic acid. Additional water washes should be used to rinse tissue before drying and coverslipping.

Fluoro-jade staining procedures are flexible and therefore can be adapted to be compatible with other staining techniques such as immunohistochemistry. Several modifications to the general procedures can be made such as reducing potassium permanganate incubations to avoid disrupting immunofluorescent labeling. Background can be decreased by alternative methods such as lowering staining temperature or decreasing fluoro-jade concentration, which may be more compatible with other labeling techniques. Such alterations, however should be determined empirically to optimize specific experimental conditions.

In addition to staining tissue from treated subjects, positive and negative controls should be included to ensure method specificity and validity. Typically tissue from untreated control subjects is included to show specificity for degenerating neurons as fluoro-jade should not stain non-degenerating tissue. Additionally, a positive control is included to ensure validity of staining procedures; to show that degenerating neurons will be stained with fluoro-jade. An acceptable positive control includes neurodegenerative tissue from subjects where fluoro-jade has already been validated, such as kainic acid treated animals.

== Analysis ==
Fluoro-jade–stained tissue can be visualized under an epifluorescent microscope using a filter system designed for fluorescein or fluorescein isothiocyanate (FITC) (excitation: 495 nm; emission:521 nm). Multiple morphological features can be detected using fluoro-jade stain including cell bodies, dendrites, axons, and axon terminals. Even though all fluoro-jade derivatives can detect these specific morphological features, the newer derivatives (fluoro-jade B and fluoro-jade C) have greater specificity and resolution and therefore are superior in detecting finer morphological features. Fluoro-jade is typically quantified in every 6th–12th 40 nm section within the region of interest and expressed as cells/section. Alternatively, stereological procedures may be used to estimate total fluoro-jade positive cells within the defined region.

== Technique validation ==
As the mechanism of fluoro-jade labeling is unknown, correlative analysis with traditional neuronal degeneration stains was used to validate this technique. Initially fluoro-jade staining was compared with H&E and de Olmos's cupric-staining methodologies in a variety of neurotoxic models of neurodegeneration such as injection of kainic acid, MPTP, or multivalent metals. Each of these neurotoxic insults produce brain-region specific neuronal degeneration and thus could be used to the determine specificity of fluoro-jade. Indeed, these studies demonstrated that fluoro-jade consistently reproduced insult specific staining patterns of neuronal degeneration that were identical to H&E and de Olmos's cupric staining patterns after the same neurotoxic insults. These results suggest that fluoro-jade is a reliable marker of neurodegeneration.

Larry Schmued suggests that a basic "death molecule" is expressed by damaged cells and that the highly anionic and acidic fluoro-jade may be specific for this target. Further supporting the validity of fluoro-jade stain and this hypothesis is the work of Auer et al., who demonstrated that another anionic dye, fuchsine acid, could successfully bind to damaged neurons after a hyperglycemic insult presumably by the same electrostatic mechanism as fluoro-jade. These neurons were characterized by cell death morphology including condensed chromatin, a disrupted plasma membrane, and a disrupted nuclear membrane.

Although fluoro-jade and de Olmos's silver stain have the same pattern of staining in models of neurotoxicity, there are inherent differences between the two methodologies that may have physiological implications. For example, a time course analysis of neuronal degeneration between the two techniques shows that silver stain is evident earlier after a neurotoxic insult which may suggest that fluoro-jade is specific for a later, more committed stage of the degenerative process.

== Applications ==
Traumatic brain injury

Spinal cord injury

Alzheimer's disease

Aging

Stroke

Epilepsy

Alcoholism

Drug abuse

== Other ==
Fluoro-jade may also be useful for other applications other than labeling degeneration neurons of the brain. Several reports have demonstrated that fluoro-jade is also useful in detecting glia, specifically reactive astroglia and microglia. Thus fluoro-jade may be used to assess glial responses associated with neurotoxicity. Additionally, other studies demonstrate that fluoro-jade can also label neurons outside the CNS such as neurons of the dorsal root ganglia. Finally, fluoro-jade may find use in non-neuronal systems as investigators have reported its use to assess cell death in renal tubular epithelial cells, in vitro and in vivo.
