= Maumelle Ordnance Works Bunker No. 4 =

- Maumelle Ordnance Works Bunker #4
- U.S. National Register of Historic Places
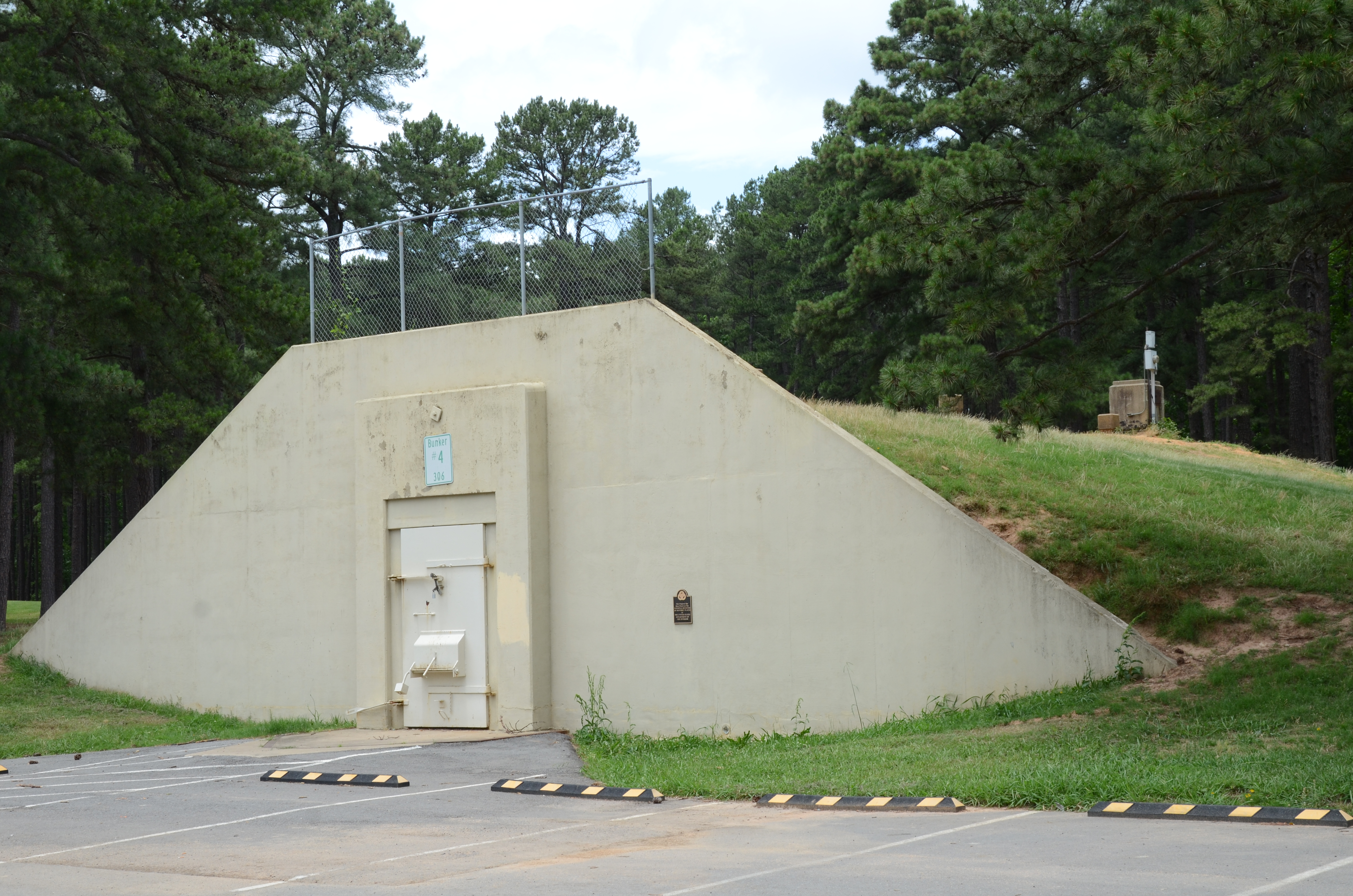

- Location within Arkansas Location within the United States
- Location: 4 Willastein Dr., Maumelle, Arkansas
- Coordinates: 34°51′16″N 92°24′46″W
- Area: less than one acre
- Built: 1942
- Built by: The City Services Defense Corporation of New York
- NRHP reference No.: 06000417
- Added to NRHP: May 24, 2006

The Maumelle Ordnance Works Bunker No. 4 is a historic munitions storage facility at 4 Willastein Drive in Maumelle, Arkansas. It is a concrete structure, 61 by 27 feet (18.6 m × 8.2 m), with a rounded roof and ventilation stack. It is covered with earth, with a trapezoidal concrete side wall exposed, which has a steel door at its center. The bunker was built in 1941–42 to store the explosives picric acid and ammonium picrate for use during World War II. Of 21 built in Maumelle, all but three have been demolished, and this is the only one that is entirely intact.

The bunker was listed on the National Register of Historic Places in 2006.

== See also ==
- National Register of Historic Places listings in Pulaski County, Arkansas
