= Picrate =

Salts and esters of picric acid

Chemical structure of the picrate anion

A picrate is a salt containing the anion (O_{2}N)_{3}C_{6}H_{2}O^{−} or an ester derivative of the picrate anion. These salts are often produced by reactions of picric acid (2,4,6-trinitrophenol). The picrate ion is intensely yellow, although many of its salts are brown or orange-red.

== Explosives ==
Many picrates are explosives, for example ammonium picrate (known as Dunnite). Some are used as primary explosives, namely lead picrate or potassium picrate which find their use as primers for cartridge ammunition. Picrates of some metals tend to be significantly more sensitive to impact, friction and shock than picric acid itself. As a result, storage of picric acid (or mixtures containing it) in metal containers is strongly discouraged due to the high risk of accidental explosion.

== Other uses ==
Ferrous picrate is used in some applications as a diesel fuel additive to achieve better mileage.

Sodium picrate is used as an etchant in metallography to differ preeutectoid ferrite in hypoeutectoid steel from preeutectoid cementite in hypereutectoid steel by etching cementite to a dark colour, whereas not attacking ferrite and thus it remains reflective.

Ethers and esters of picric acid are also called picrates. The ether methyl picrate (CAS# 606-35-9) has the formula (O_{2}N)_{3}C_{6}H_{2}OCH_{3}.
