= VVG =

VVG may refer to:

- V. V. Giri, (1894–1980), former president of India
- Verhoeff–Van Gieson stain
- Verden Transport Company (Verdener Verkehrsgesellschaft)
- Violent video game
- Vincent van Gogh
