= Ira Van Gieson =

American physician (1866–1913)

Ira Van Gieson

Ira Thompson Van Gieson (1866, Long Island – March 24, 1913, New York City) was an American neurologist, psychiatrist, bacteriologist and neuropathologist.

Ira was born on Long Island in 1866, as the son of Dr. Ransford Everett Van Gieson (1836–1921). He was of Dutch-Jewish heritage. Van Gieson graduated from the College of Physicians of Columbia University in 1885. In 1887, he served as a teacher at the college of physicians and surgeons and in 1894 he was appointed instructor of pathology and histology of the nervous system.

In 1896, he was appointed as first director of the Pathological Institute of the New York State Hospitals for the Insane (renamed New York State Psychiatric Institute in 1929). He was dismissed after five years because of political controversy involving the newly appointed president of the NY State Commission on Lunacy, Peter Wise. As a result, the whole Institute's faculty resigned and in 1900 a formal "Protest of the Friends of the Present Management of the N.Y. Pathological Institute" was signed (S. Weir Mitchell, James J. Putnam, Percival Bailey, Morton Prince, Frederick Peterson, and many others). After dismissal, he returned into the service of the New York State Health Department. He practised hypnosis and occasionally served as a forensic psychiatrist.

He died at the age of 47 at the Bellevue Hospital, NY, on March 24, 1913. He suffered from chronic nephritis.

His obituarist, William Alanson White, wrote:

"Dr. Van Gieson can best be described in a few words as a genius. He knew none of the rules that applied to the average man. He had a keen and incisive mind, he was alert and full of interest in everything, but he possessed that sensitive organization which made anything approaching control from outside sources utterly unsupportable. He was a spasmodic and irregular worker, when he worked, working with a fervor and depth of distraction that made him utterly forget time, food and, sleep, working for days and days without rest, way into the small hours of the morning. These periods of tremendous activity were followed by days of inactivity, during which he did nothing, and sometimes was entirely inaccessible, not even attending his office. He was, however, tremendously productive."

Van Gieson introduced the picric acid stain (Van Gieson's stain) to neurohistology in 1889. He coined the term "psychomotor epilepsy".

He collaborated with Boris Sidis, Bernard Sachs, and others.

== Works ==
Ira Van Gieson is the sole author unless otherwise indicated

- Van Gieson, IRA (1887). "A Resume of Recent Technical Methods for the Nervous System". Journal of Nervous & Mental Disease. 14 (5): 310–315. doi:10.1097/00005053-188714050-00003. S2CID 220567487.
- "A Report Of A Case Of Syringomyelia". Journal of Nervous & Mental Disease. 16 (7): 393–411. 1889.
- Laboratory notes of technical methods for the nervous system. New York, 1889
- L. Emmett Holt (1890). "A Case Of Spina Bifida With Suppurative Spinal Meningitis And Ependymitis, Due To Bacteria Entering The Wall Of The Sac". Journal of Nervous & Mental Disease. 15 (12): 773–781. doi:10.1097/00005053-189012000-00001. S2CID 145315705.
- Gieson, IRA VAN (1890). "A Contribution To The Pathology Of The Laryngeal And Other Crises In Tabes Dorsalis". Journal of Nervous & Mental Disease. 15 (7): 458–474. doi:10.1097/00005053-189007000-00004. S2CID 71239913.
- Alternate paralysis due to multiple areas of softening in the pons varolii, extracted from the proceedings of the New York Pathological Society, 1890, in Miscellaneous Papers from the Laboratory of the Alumni Association, Department of Pathology, Columbia University, vol 1, 1890–1891, pp 1–3
- A Study of the Artefacts of the Nervous System: The Topographical Alterations of the Gray and White Matters of the Spinal Cord Caused by Autopsy Bruises, and a Consideration of Heterotopia of the Spinal Cord. D. Appleton and Co., 1892
- "A report of the gross and microscopical examinations in six cases of death by strong electrical currents". New York Med J. 55: 1–19. 1892.
- "A contribution to the pathology of traumatic epilepsy". Medical Record. 43: 513–521. 1893.
- "Remarks on the scope and organization of the Pathological Institute of the New York State Hospitals". State Hospitals Bulletin. 1 (255–74): 407–88. 1896.
- The toxic basis of neural diseases. State Hospitals Bull I:407–488 (1896)
- (with Arnold Graf) The individuality of the cell. State Hospitals Bulletin (April, 1897)
- Epilepsy and expert testimony. Utica, 1897
- (with Boris Sidis) Neuron energy and its psychomotor manifestations. Archives of Neurology and Psychopathology 1, pp. 5–24 (1898) link
- Gieson, Ira Van (1899). "Letter From Dr. Van Gieson" (PDF). American Journal of Insanity. 56: 206–207. doi:10.1176/ajp.56.1.206.
- Correlation of sciences in the investigation of nervous and mental diseases. State Hospitals Press, 1899 PDF (Internet Archive)
- Gieson, Ira Van (1899). "The Formation And Excretion Of The Metaplasm Granules Of The Neuron". The Journal of Nervous and Mental Disease. 26 (2): 112. doi:10.1097/00005053-189902000-00006. S2CID 146826237.
- Gieson, Ira Van (1908). "On Some Peculiar Hollow Nuclear-Like Structures In the Neurone Bodies In Rabies". Journal of Nervous & Mental Disease. 35 (3): 182–183. doi:10.1097/00005053-190803000-00007.
