= Martius yellow =

Names
- Preferred IUPAC name 2,4-Dinitronaphthalen-1-ol
- Other names 2,4-Dinitronaphthol; Martinsgelb; C.I. 10315; Acid yellow 24

Identifiers
CAS Number	605-69-6
3D model (JSmol)	Interactive image
ChEBI	CHEBI:67128
ChemSpider	11309
ECHA InfoCard	100.009.176
EC Number	210-093-1
MeSH	C057508
PubChem CID	11802
UNII	5PQ80Y1K6H
CompTox Dashboard (EPA)	DTXSID7060544
- InChI: InChI=1S/C10H6N2O5/c13-10-7-4-2-1-3-6(7)8(11(14)15)5-9(10)12(16)17/h1-5,13H Key: FFRBMBIXVSCUFS-UHFFFAOYSA-N; InChI=1/C10H6N2O5/c13-10-7-4-2-1-3-6(7)8(11(14)15)5-9(10)12(16)17/h1-5,13H Key: FFRBMBIXVSCUFS-UHFFFAOYAH
- SMILES: C1=CC=C2C(=C1)C(=CC(=C2O)[N+](=O)[O-])[N+](=O)[O-]

Properties
Chemical formula	C_{10}H_{6}N_{2}O_{5}
Molar mass	234.167 g·mol^{−1}
Appearance	brownish-yellow powder
- Except where otherwise noted, data are given for materials in their standard state (at 25 °C [77 °F], 100 kPa). verify (what is ?) Infobox references

Martius yellow is an organic compound with the formula C_{10}H_{5}(OH)(NO_{2})_{2}. It is one of several isomers of dinitro-1-naphthol. It is prepared by nitration of 1-naphthol.

The compound was reported in the 1860's and then was briefly popular for dying wool. The dye was however not light-fast.

Martius yellow stains have been used to stain erythrocytes yellow so that they contrast well with red fibrin in trichrome staining methods such as Lendrum's Picro Mallory and Slidder's Martius, Scarlet and Blue (MSB). It can be combined with other small molecular weight yellow dyes to increase stain intensity.
