= Pierre Masson =

Canadian physician (1880–1959)

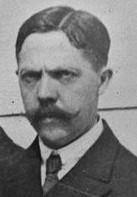
Pierre Masson

Claude L. Pierre Masson (November 12, 1880 – May 11, 1959) was a Canadian medical doctor. He was considered one of the leading histopathologists of his era.

He was born in Dijon and studied medicine at the University of Paris and the Pasteur Institute. Originally, Masson planned a career in clinical medicine, but, after suffering poor health, decided to change his area of interest to biology. Masson was offered the chair of pathology at the University of Strasbourg. He is credited with first describing neurocrine secretion and his work led to the development of modern neuroendocrinology. He was also known for his research into brain tumours. Masson developed a three-stain protocol used in histology known as "Masson's trichrome stain". In 1927, he left Strasbourg to become chair of the Pathology department at the Université de Montréal. Masson reworked the pathology curriculum at the university and reorganized the pathology laboratories there. He retired from that position in 1954.

He died at the age of 79 and was buried in the Notre Dame des Neiges Cemetery.

Masson was named to the Canadian Medical Hall of Fame in 1997.
