= Ponceau 2R =

Identifiers
CAS Number	3761-53-3
3D model (JSmol)	Interactive image
ChEMBL	ChEMBL1356392
ChemSpider	4885471
ECHA InfoCard	100.021.072
EC Number	223-178-3
MeSH	ponceau+2R
PubChem CID	111804
UNII	U3J3635T4U
CompTox Dashboard (EPA)	DTXSID8021228
- InChI: InChI=1S/C18H16N2O7S2/c1-10-3-6-15(11(2)7-10)19-20-17-14-5-4-13(28(22,23)24)8-12(14)9-16(18(17)21)29(25,26)27/h3-9,21H,1-2H3,(H,22,23,24)(H,25,26,27) Key: YYYARFHFWYKNLF-UHFFFAOYSA-N
- SMILES: CC1=CC(=C(C=C1)NN=C2C3=C(C=C(C=C3)S(=O)(=O)O)C=C(C2=O)S(=O)(=O)O)C

Properties
Chemical formula	C_{18}H_{14}N_{2}O_{7}S_{2}
Molar mass	436.461

Hazards
- GHS labelling
Pictograms	(GHS08: Health hazard)
Signal word	Warning
Hazard statements	H351
Precautionary statements	P201, P202, P280, P308+P313, P405, P501
- Except where otherwise noted, data are given for materials in their standard state (at 25 °C [77 °F], 100 kPa). verify (what is ?) Infobox references

Ponceau 2R, Xylidine ponceau, Ponceau G, Red R, Acid Red 26, Food Red 5, or C.I. 16150 is a red azo dye used in histology for staining. It is easily soluble in water and slightly in ethanol. It usually comes as a disodium salt.

Xylidine ponceau is mostly used only in the Masson's trichrome stain as a red counterstain, where it imparts orange hue to the red-stained cytoplasmic structures.

Its other names are: Acetacid red J, Acidal ponceau G, Acid leather red KPR, Acid leather red P2R, Acid leather scarlet IRW, Acid ponceau R, Acid ponceau 2RL, Acid ponceau special, Acid scarlet, Acid scarlet 2RL, Acid scarlet 2RN, Acilan ponceau RRL, Ahcocid fast scarlet R, Aizen ponceau RH, Amacid lake scarlet 2R, Amacid scarlet 2R, Brilliant ponceau G, Calcocid 2RIL, Calcocid scarlet 2R, Calcocid scarlet 2RIL, Calcolake scarlet 2R, Certicol ponceau MXS, C.I. Acid red 26, C.I. Food red 5, Colacid ponceau special, Comacid scarlet 2R D and C red No. 5, Edicol supra ponceau R, Fenazo scarlet 2R, Hexacol ponceau MX, Hexacol ponceau 2R, Hidacid scarlet 2R, Hispacid ponceau R, Java ponceau 2R, Kiton ponceau R, Kiton scarlet 2RC, Lake ponceau, Lake scarlet R, Lake scarlet 2RBN, Naphthalene lake scarlet R, Naphthalene scarlet R, Naphthazine scarlet 2R, Neklacid red RR, New ponceau 4R, Paper red HRR, Pigment ponceau R, Ponceau BNA, Ponceau de xylidine, Ponceau R, Ponceau red, Ponceau RG, Ponceau xylidine, 1695 Red, Red for lakes J, Red R, Tertracid ponceau 2R, Xylidine ponceau 3RS, Xylidine red.
