= Lead picrate =

Names
- IUPAC name Lead(II) 2,4,6-trinitrophenolate
- Other names Lead dipicrate

Identifiers
CAS Number	25721-38-4; [https://commonchemistry.cas.org/detail?cas_rn=6477-64-1 ChemSpider ID: 2308056 6477-64-1 ChemSpider ID: 2308056]
3D model (JSmol)	Interactive image
ECHA InfoCard	100.210.303
EC Number	229-335-2
PubChem CID	3045289; 162344796
CompTox Dashboard (EPA)	DTXSID80215079
- InChI: InChI=1S/2C6H3N3O7.Pb/c2*10-6-4(8(13)14)1-3(7(11)12)2-5(6)9(15)16;/h2*1-2,10H;/q;;+2/p-2 Key: MHVVRZIRWITSIP-UHFFFAOYSA-L
- SMILES: C1=C(C=C(C(=C1[N+](=O)[O-])[O-])[N+](=O)[O-])[N+](=O)[O-].C1=C(C=C(C(=C1[N+](=O)[O-])[O-])[N+](=O)[O-])[N+](=O)[O-].[Pb+2]

Properties
Chemical formula	C_{12}H_{4}N_{6}O_{14}Pb
Molar mass	663.4 g·mol^{−1}
Appearance	Orange powder
Solubility in water	7.06 g/L
Solubility	Soluble in ethanol, acetic acid Very soluble in DMF, dichloromethane

Hazards
- GHS labelling
Pictograms	(GHS01: Explosive) (GHS07: Exclamation mark) (GHS08: Health hazard) (GHS09: Environmental hazard)
Signal word	Danger
Hazard statements	H201, H302, H332, H360, H373, H410
Precautionary statements	P260, P264, P270, P271, P273, P280, P304+P340, P330, P391, P405, P501
Autoignition temperature	270.75-327.15 °C (519.7-621.0 °F; 600.3-543.9 K)
- Except where otherwise noted, data are given for materials in their standard state (at 25 °C [77 °F], 100 kPa). Infobox references

Lead picrate is an organic picrate salt. It is a sensitive and highly explosive compound that is typically found as a hydrate. Dry lead picrate is extremely dangerous and cannot be handled without explosive decomposition occurring.

== History ==
Lead picrate was first discovered in the early 1900s. It was investigated by numerous militaries during the First World War as a potential primary explosive, most notably Germany for using it in blasting caps.

== Preparation ==
Numerous lead precursors can be used to create lead picrate. Two of the simplest examples of lead picrate synthesis are the addition of lead(II) oxide or lead carbonate with picric acid.
