= Dispersion staining =

The optical properties of all liquid and solid materials change as a function of the wavelength of light used to measure them. This change as a function of wavelength is called the dispersion of the optical properties. The graph created by plotting the optical property of interest by the wavelength at which it is measured is called a dispersion curve.

The dispersion staining is an analytical technique used in light microscopy that takes advantage of the differences in the dispersion curve of the refractive index of an unknown material relative to a standard material with a known dispersion curve to identify or characterize that unknown material. These differences become manifest as a color when the two dispersion curves intersect for some visible wavelength. This is an optical staining technique and requires no stains or dyes to produce the color. Its primary use today is in the confirmation of the presence of asbestos in construction materials but it has many other applications.

== Types ==
There are five basic optical configurations of the microscope used for dispersion staining. Each configuration has its advantages and disadvantages. The first two of these, Becke` line dispersion staining and oblique dispersion staining, were first reported in the United States by F. E. Wright in 1911 based on work done by O. Maschke in Germany during the 1870s. The five dispersion staining configurations are:

1. Colored Becke` Line Dispersion Staining (Maschke, 1872; Wright, 1911)
2. Oblique Illumination Dispersion Staining (Wright, 1911)
3. Darkfield Dispersion Staining (Crossmon, 1948)
4. Phase Contrast Dispersion Staining (Crossmon, 1949)
5. Objective Stop Dispersion Staining (Cherkasov, 1958)

All of these configurations have the same requirements for the preparation of the sample to be examined. First, the substance of interest must be in intimate contact with the known reference material. In other words, the clean solid must be mounted in a reference liquid, one mineral phase must be in intimate contact with the reference mineral phase, or the homogenous liquid must contain the reference solid. Most applications involve a solid mounted in a reference liquid (referred to as the mounting medium). Second, dispersion colors will only be present if the two materials have the same refractive index for some wavelength in the visible spectrum (referred to as λo) and they have very different dispersions curves for the refractive index. Finally, the sample must be properly mounted under a coverslip to minimize any other optical effect that could complicate the interpretation of the color seen. Once these criteria are met the sample is ready to be examined.

The starting configuration of the microscope for all of these methods is properly adjusted Köhler illumination. Some additional adjustments are required for each of the methods.

=== Becke' line dispersion staining ===
The Becke' Line method takes advantage of the fact that particles behave basically like lenses because they tend to be thinner at the edges than they are at the center. If the particle has a higher refractive index than the liquid surrounding it then it behaves as a convex lens and focuses a parallel beam of light on the side opposite the source of the light. Looking through the microscope this is seen as a bright ring of light, the Becke` Line, moving in from the edge as the particle is dropped out of focus by increasing the distance between the stage of the microscope and the objective. If the stage is moved closer to the objective then the particle behaves like a magnifying glass and the image of the Becke` Line is magnified and it appears outside the particle.

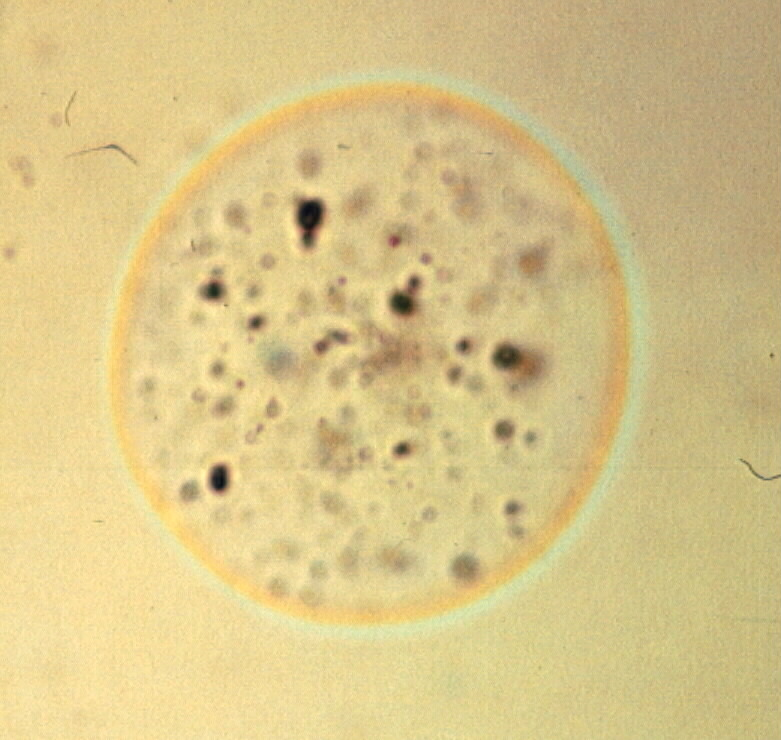
These are the colored Becke` lines of a glass sphere that matches the refractive index of the mounting medium at a wavelength of 589 nanometers.

A requirement for this method is that the incoming beam of light is as parallel as possible. This requires the closing down of the sub-stage condenser iris. Closing the sub-stage condenser iris decreases the resolution of the particle and increases the depth of field over which other objects may interfere with the effect seen. For large particles this is not a significant limitation but for small particles it is a problem.

When the conditions for dispersion staining are met (the particle is mounted in a liquid with a matching refractive index in the visible range of wavelengths but with a very different refractive index) then the particle has a high refractive index in the red part of the spectrum and a lower refractive index in the blue. This is because liquids tend to have a steeper dispersion curve than colorless solids. As a result, when the particle is dropped out of focus the red wavelengths are focused inward. For the blue wavelengths the particle behaves like a concave lens and the blue Becke` Line moves out into the liquid.

The color of these two bands of light will vary depending on where the particle and liquid match in refractive index, the location of λo. If the match is near the blue end of the spectrum then the Becke' Line moving into the particle will contain nearly all of the visible wavelengths except blue and will appear as a pale yellow. The Becke` Line moving out will appear a very dark blue. If the match is near the red end of the spectrum then the Becke` Line moving into the particle will appear dark red and the Becke` Line moving out will appear pale blue. If the λo is near the middle of the visible wavelengths then the Becke` Line moving into the particle will be orange and the Becke` Line moving out will be sky blue. The colors seen (see Chart 1) can be used to very precisely determine the refractive index of the unknown or confirm the identity of the unknown, as in the case of asbestos identification. Examples of this type of dispersion staining and the colors shown for different λo's can be seen at http://microlabgallery.com/gallery-dsbecke.aspx. The presence of two colors helps to bracket the wavelength at which the refractive index matches for the two materials.

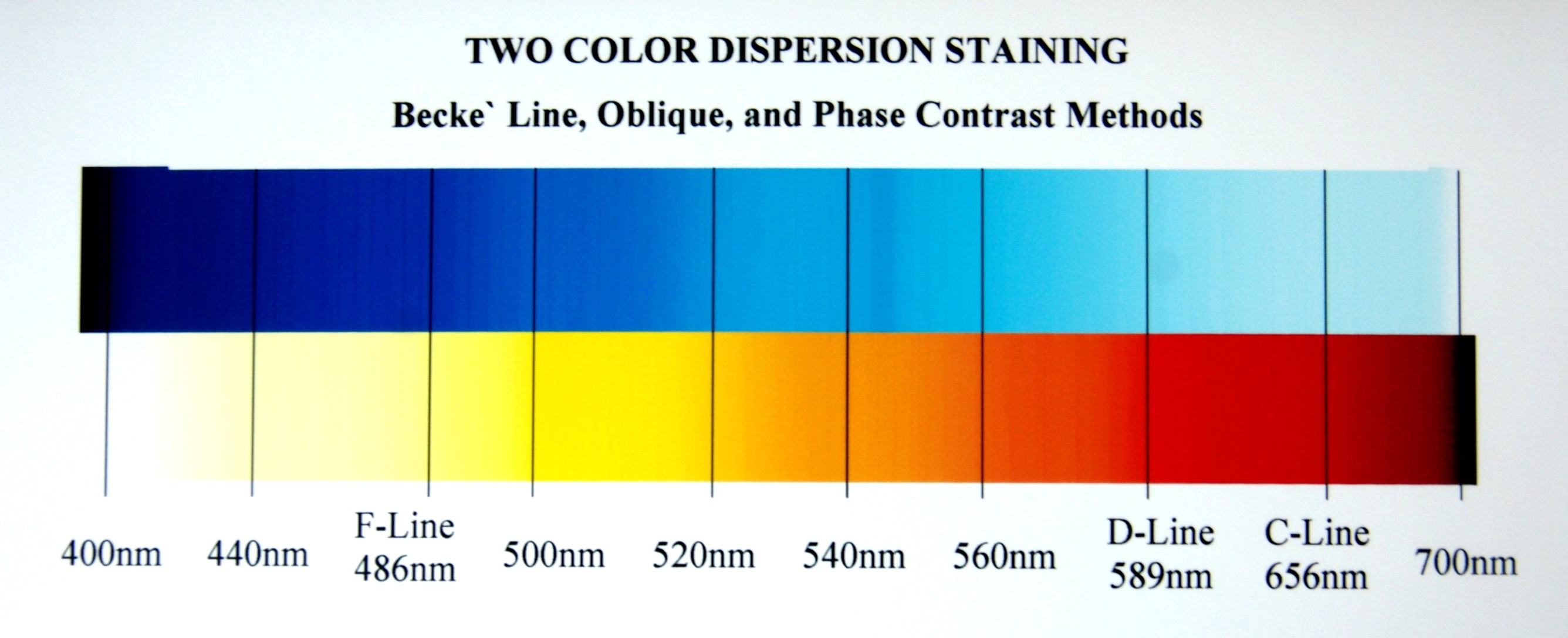
Chart 1: These are the dispersion staining colors associated with different matching wavelengths when using any of the methods that generate a color pair.

The Becke' Line method of dispersion staining is primarily used as an exploratory technique. As a particle field is scanned and the fine focus is constantly adjusted and flash of color around or in a particle is noted and one of the other methods can be used to sharpen the sensitivity in determining the matching wavelength. For large particles (greater than 25 micrometers in diameter) the colored Becke` Lines may be sufficiently distinct to determine the lo with the required accuracy. For very large particles (greater than 100 micrometers) this may be the best method because it is least sensitive to other types of optical interferences.

=== Oblique illumination dispersion staining ===
Oblique illumination dispersion staining is the result of refraction and the convex shape of most particles. With oblique illumination the beam of light illuminating the sample is directed at an oblique angle through the sample. This enhances the resolution of structural details in the particle that are oriented at right angles to the incident beam of light while sacrificing some of the resolution of features parallel to the direction of the beam. Because of this orientation of the beam the relative refractive index of the particle and the mounting liquid becomes apparent. The wavelengths for which the liquid has the higher refractive index are refracted into the front lens of the objective from the side of the particle nearest the side from which the light is coming. If the particle has a higher refractive index for all visible wavelengths then this side of the particle is dark. The side farthest from the source of the light shows all the wavelengths for which the particle has the higher refractive index. These effects are seen with the particle in sharp focus. This is a significant advantage over the Becke` line method because the particle doesn't have to be defocus to see the colors and generally the colors are more distinct than are the Becke` line dispersion colors. The colors seen with this type of dispersion staining are about the same as those with the Becke` Line method shown in Chart 1. Examples of this type of dispersion staining and the colors shown for different λo's can be seen at microlabgallery.com site for Becke` Line Dispersion Staining. The presence of two colors helps to bracket the wavelength at which the refractive index matches for the two materials.

=== Darkfield illumination dispersion staining ===
Darkfield illumination dispersion staining is the result of the image of the particle being formed only by the light that is refracted while all the direct light impinging on the specimen is oriented at such an angle that it misses the front lens of the objective.

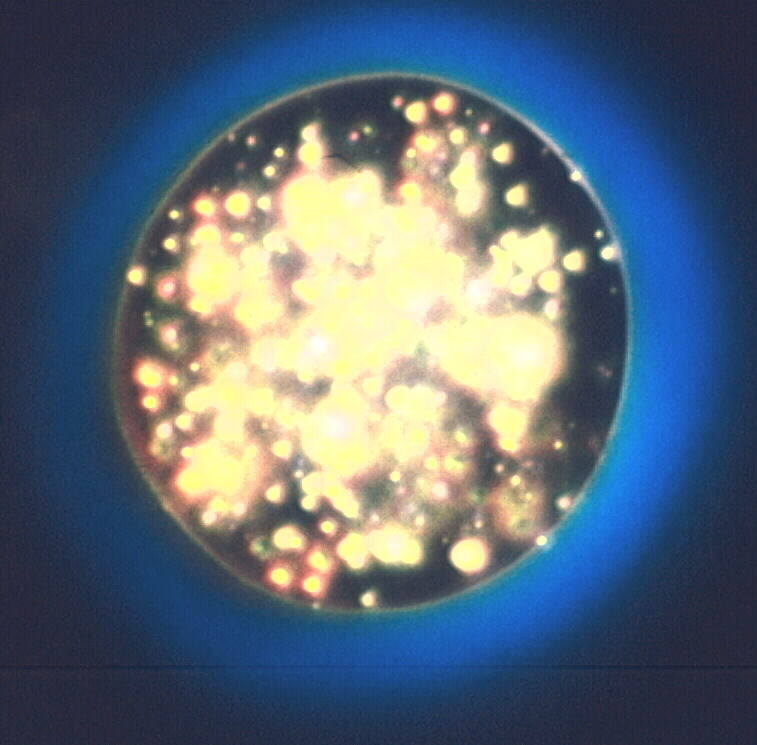
This is the color shown by a glass sphere that matches the refractive index of the mounting medium at a wavelength of 589 nanometers when using darkfield dispersion staining.

The result is that the background is black. All of the features of objects in the field of view that don't match the refractive index of the mounting medium appear as bright white. When a particle is mounted in a liquid that matches its refractive index somewhere in the visible wavelengths then those wavelengths are not refracted by the particle and are not collected by the objective. The image of the object is formed by all of the wavelengths that remain. These wavelengths combine to produce a single color that can be used to indicate which band of wavelengths are missing (see Chart 2). Examples of this type of dispersion staining and the colors shown for different λo's can be seen at the microlabgallery.com site for Darkfield Dispersion Staining. This method is more difficult to interpret due to the single color rather than two bracketing colors but is relatively accurate near the center of the visible range.

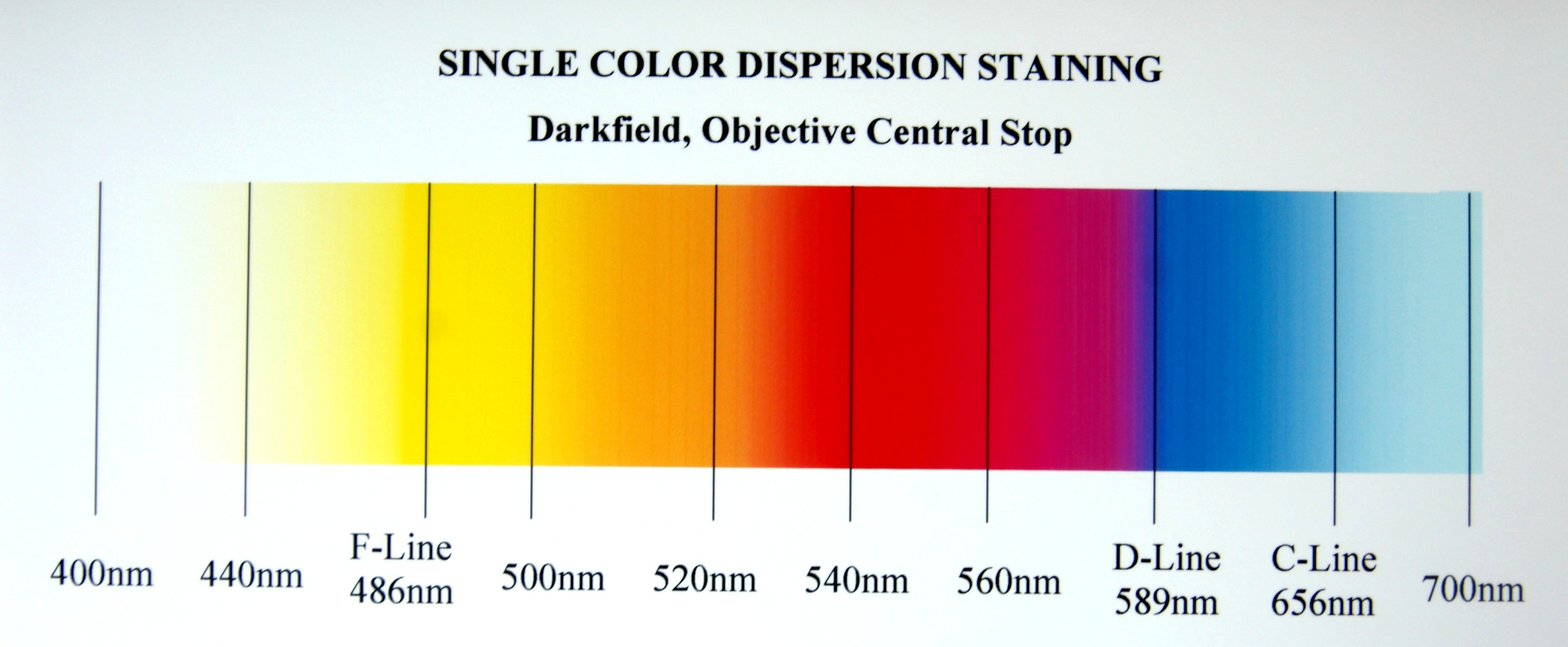
Chart 2: These are the dispersion staining colors associated with different λo's when using any of the methods that generate a single color.

=== Phase contrast dispersion staining ===
Phase contrast dispersion staining requires that a phase contrast objective with the appropriate phase annulus in the substage condenser be used to see the effect. It takes advantage of the fact that the rays of light that are not shifted in phase by the presence of the object are separated from the phase shifted rays at the back focal plane of the objective.

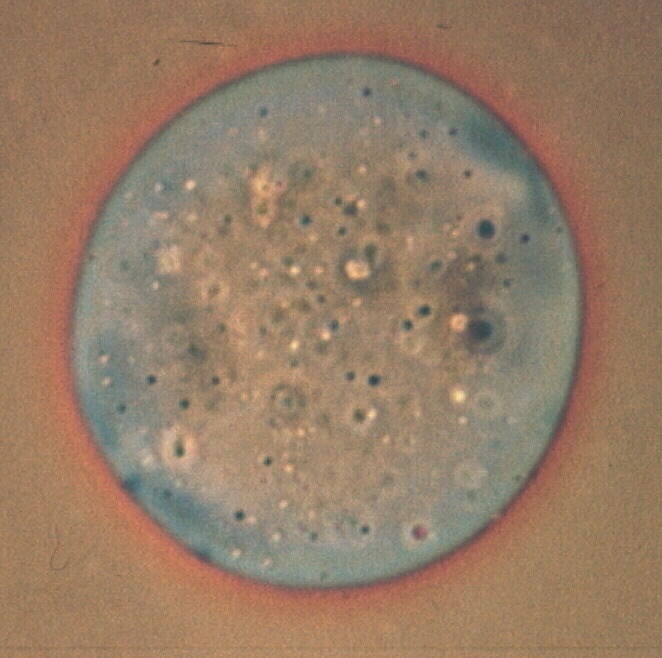
These are the colors shown by a glass sphere that matches the refractive index of the mounting medium at a wavelength of 589 nanometers when using phase contrast dispersion staining.

These unaffected rays are then significantly decreased in intensity. With “Positive Phase Contrast”, the particle appears colored from the contributing wavelengths for which the mounting medium has the higher refractive index. Because of the physical size of the phase plate and its image onto the back focal plane of the objective where it is modified, a halo is formed around the particle. This halo takes on the color of the combined wavelengths for which the particle has the higher refractive index. The colors seen with this type of dispersion staining are about the same as those with the Becke` Line method shown in Chart 1. Examples of this type of dispersion staining and the colors shown for different λo's can be seen at the microlabgallery.com site for Phase Contrast Dispersion Staining. The presence of two colors helps to bracket the wavelength at which the refractive index matches for the two materials.

=== Objective stop dispersion staining ===
Objective stop dispersion staining takes advantage of the fact that all light unaltered by the presence of particles in the field of view is focused at the back focal plane of the objective. If the substage condenser iris is closed down then all of the direct light is focused into a small image of the opening in the substage condenser iris at the back focal plane of the objective. If an opaque stop is place at that position then all of the direct light is blocked and the image of the particle is made up by the wavelengths at which the particles and the mounting liquid do not match. These colors are basically the same as the colors seen when using darkfield dispersion staining. The double aperturing of this method enhances the color effect but also sacrifices resolution of the particles. In fields of view where particles may be stacked or in very close proximity it may be difficult to be sure which small particle is actually producing the color. Examples of this type of dispersion staining and the colors shown for different λo's can be seen at the microlabgallery.com site for Objective Stop Dispersion Staining. This method is more difficult to interpret due to the single color rather than two bracketing colors but is relatively accurate near the center of the visible range.

== Historical development ==
Isaac Newton demonstrated that “white” light was actually composed of many different “simple” colors and that materials had different optical properties depending on which of the simple colors was being used to measure them. He demonstrated these facts with a series of experiments using one or more prisms. The difference in the optical properties of materials as a function of the “simple” or monochromatic colors of light is called dispersion. He was also the first person to note that different materials had different dispersion properties. “Sulfurous” liquids (organic liquids) had a higher refractive index than was expected based on their specific gravity and had a steeper dispersion curve than most solids. These well documented observations would take just over two centuries to become an analytical technique.

The first paper documenting dispersion effects seen through the microscope was written in 1872 by O. Maschke in Germany. This paper discussed the occurrence of colored Becke` lines when a particle was in a liquid of matching refractive index. Prior to this paper these colors were thought to be the result of the microscope lenses (chromatic aberration) and not the result of the slide mounted subject and the medium in which it was mounted. In 1884 and 1895 Christian Christiansen published his data on the first analytical application of dispersion colors, the Christiansen filter. He found that by placing a colorless transparent powder into a vial of a colorless organic liquid he could create monochromatic light from white light if the liquid and powder had the same refractive index for just that wavelength. Only that wavelength would see an optically homogeneous media and pass directly through the vial. The other wavelengths would be scattered in all directions by the particles in the liquid. Monochromatic light could be viewed by looking through the vial along the path of the direct beam of light. At any other angle the complementary color of that wavelength would be observed. If he chose a liquid that matched the refractive index of the powder in the far red, 700 nanometers wavelength, he could create any other wavelength by heating the vial, thereby changing the wavelength at which the powder and liquid's refractive index matched. This technique did not work for any powder or liquid. For optimal effects the powder and the liquid had to be carefully selected so that the intersection of their dispersion curves created as large an angle as possible over the full range of visible wavelengths. Christiansen's interest was in the creation of monochromatic filters and not the development of an analytical technique. It wasn't until 1911 that the analytical potential of dispersion effects was reported by F. E. Wright. He observed that the colored Becke` lines noted by Maschke could be used to distinguish between two materials with the same refractive index but different dispersion curves. The colors could also indicate the region of the visible light spectrum for which a particle and liquid it was mounted in had a refractive index match. Wright also noted that by using oblique transmitted illumination the particle would show these colors without having to inspect the Becke` line.

The technical literature had little additional discussion of dispersion effects until 1948. That year S. C. Crossmon, N. B. Dodge, and co-authors R. C. Emmons and R. N. Gates all wrote papers on the use of dispersion effects through the microscope to characterize particles. Crossmon seems to have coined the term “Dispersion Staining” as any optical technique that used the “Christiansen Effect” to produce color in the image of colorless particles. He demonstrated the use of Becke` Line, Oblique Illumination, Darkfield, and Phase Contrast Dispersion Staining methods. S. C. Crossmon and W. C. McCrone have published numerous papers on the use of objective back focal plane stop dispersion staining techniques since that time. Yu. A. Cherkasov published an excellent paper on this topic in 1958 and it was translated into English in 1960. Well over 100 papers have been written on the various methods of dispersion staining and their application since about 1950 and most of these since 1960.

In spite of the early work done on this technique it was not until the 1950s that it became generally known among microscopists. It is now recognized as a powerful tool in the characterization of materials and the detection of low level contaminants. It has demonstrated sensitivity for particle contaminants in powders down to the parts per million.

The dispersion of the refractive index is a fundamental property of matter. It may be thought of as the result of the relative proximity of the harmonic frequencies of the outer shell electrons in a compound to the frequencies of visible light. The harmonic frequency of the bonding electron is the result of the energy of that bond. If the bond is very strong the frequency will be very high. The higher the frequency the less effect the difference in frequencies from blue to red will have on the refractive index. For the relatively high energy bonds in most inorganic solids this means their refractive indices change very little over the visible range of frequencies. The refractive indices of organic compounds on the other hand, with their lower bonding energies, change significantly over the visible range. This difference in dispersion is the basis of the Christiansen effect and the dispersion staining methods.

== Bibliography ==
- Brown, K. M. and W. C. McCrone, “Dispersion Staining”, THE MICROSCOPE, Vol. 13, pp. 311 and Vol. 14, pp. 39, 1963.
- Cherkasov, Yu. A., “Application of ‘Focal Screening’ to Measurements of Indices of Refraction by the Immersion Method”, Trans. by Ivan Mittin, INTERNATIONAL GEOLOGICAL REVIEW, vol. 2, pp. 218–235, 1960.
- Crossmon, G. C. “Microscopical Distribution of Corundum Among its Natural and Artificial Associates”, ANALYTICAL CHEMISTRY, Vol. 20, No. 10, 1948.
- Crossmon, G. C., “The ‘Dispersion Staining’ method for the selective coloration of tissue.” STAIN TECHNOLOGY, Vol. 24, pp. 61-65, 1949.
- Crossmon, G. C., “Dispersion Staining Microscopy as Applied to Industrial Hygiene”, AMERICAN INDUSTRIAL HYGIENE QUARTERLY, Vol. 18, No. 4, pp. 341, 1957.
- Crutcher, E. R., “The Role of Light Microscopy in Aerospace Analytical Laboratories”, PROCEEDINGS OF THE NINTH SPACE SIMULATION SYMPOSIUM, 1977.
- Crutcher, E. R., “Optical Microscopy: An Important Tool for Particulate Receptor Source Apportionment”, PROCEEDINGS OF THE AIR POLLUTION CONTROL ASSOCIATION, pp. 266–284 1981.
- Dodge, Nelson B., “The dark-field color immersion method”, AMERICAN MINERALOGIST, vol. 33, pp. 541–549, 1948
- Emmons, R.C. and R. M. Gates, “The use of Becke line colors in refractive index determination”, AMERICAN MINERALOGIST, vol. 33, pp. 612–619, 1948
- Hoidale, Glen B., “The color identification of transparent crystalline particles with an optical microscope: a literature survey of dispersion staining”, U.S. ARMY MICROFICHE, AD 603 019, 1964.
- Kohlbeck, J.A. and W.T. Bolleter, “Microscopic determination of the degree of nitration of nitrocellulose with dispersion staining”, JOURNAL OF APPLIED POLYMER SCIENCE, vol 12, no.1, pp. 131–135, 1968.
- Laskowski, Thomas E. and David M. Scotford, “Rapid determination of olivine compositions in thin section using dispersion staining methodology”, AMERICAN MINERALOGIST, vol. 65, pp. 401–403, 1980 (available on-line at http://www.minsocam.org/ammin/AM65/AM65_401.pdf)
- McCrone, Walter C., “Dispersion Staining”, AMERICAN LABORATORY, Dec., 1983.
- McCrone, Walter C. and John Gustav Delly, The Particle Atlas, Ann Arbor Scientific Publishers, Inc., Ann Arbor, Michigan, 1973.
- Newton, Isaac, OPTICKS, Dover Publications reprint of the 4th edition of the 1704 book by Newton, 1979
- Schmidt, K. O., “Phase Contrast Microscopy and Dispersion Staining”, STAUB, Vol. 18, 1958.
- Speight, Richard G., “An Alternative Dispersion Staining Technique”, THE MICROSCOPE, Vol. 25, 1977. Schmidt, K. 8., “Phase Contrast Microscopy in the Particle Laboratory”, Staub, Vol. 22, 1962.
- Su, Shu-Chun, “Dispersion Staining - A versatile complement to Becke line method for refractive index determination”, GEOCHIMICA ET COSMOCHEMICA ACTA SUPPLEMENT, vol. 69, Issue 10, Supplement 1, Goldschmidt Conference Abstracts 2005., p.A727, 2005
- United States Environmental Protection Agency (US-EPA), https://web.archive.org/web/20081217074149/http://www.epa.gov/NE/info/testmethods/pdfs/EPA_600R93116_bulk_asbestos_part1.pdf
- United States Federal Bureau of Investigation (US-FBI), https://web.archive.org/web/20080723155043/http://www.fbi.gov/hq/lab/fsc/backissu/jan2005/standards/2005standards9.htm
- United States National Institute for Occupational Safety and Health (US-NIOSH), https://web.archive.org/web/20081007161605/http://www.cdc.gov/niosh/nmam/pdfs/9002.pdf
- United States Occupational Safety and Health Administration (US-OSHA), https://www.osha.gov/dts/sltc/methods/inorganic/id191/id191.html#sec46
- Wright, F. E., The Methods of Petrographic-Microscopic Research. Their Relative Accuracy and Range of Application, Pub. No. 158, Carnegie Inst., Washington, 1911.
