= Light green SF =

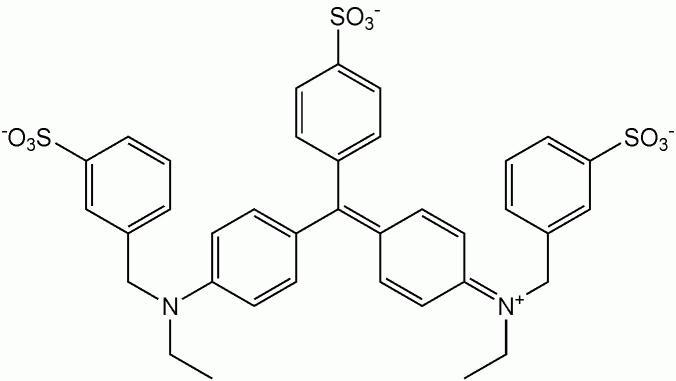

Names
- IUPAC name ethyl-[4-[[4-[ethyl-[(3-sulfophenyl)methyl]amino]phenyl]-(4-sulfophenyl)methylene]-1-cyclohexa-2,5-dienylidene]-[(3-sulfophenyl)methyl]ammonium
- Other names Light green, acid green, lissamine green SF, acid green 5, food green 2, FD&C Green no. 2, green No. 205, acid brilliant green 5, pencil green SF

Identifiers
CAS Number	5141-20-8
3D model (JSmol)	Interactive image
ChemSpider	19952
ECHA InfoCard	100.023.551
KEGG	C19439
PubChem CID	21223
UNII	3F7BHA64Z0
CompTox Dashboard (EPA)	DTXSID8020672
- InChI: InChI=1S/C37H36N2O9S3.2Na/c1-3-38(25-27-7-5-9-35(23-27)50(43,44)45)32-17-11-29(12-18-32)37(31-15-21-34(22-16-31)49(40,41)42)30-13-19-33(20-14-30)39(4-2)26-28-8-6-10-36(24-28)51(46,47)48;;/h5-24H,3-4,25-26H2,1-2H3,(H2-,40,41,42,43,44,45,46,47,48);;/q;2*+1/p-2 Key: DGOBMKYRQHEFGQ-UHFFFAOYSA-L; InChI=1/C37H36N2O9S3.2Na/c1-3-38(25-27-7-5-9-35(23-27)50(43,44)45)32-17-11-29(12-18-32)37(31-15-21-34(22-16-31)49(40,41)42)30-13-19-33(20-14-30)39(4-2)26-28-8-6-10-36(24-28)51(46,47)48;;/h5-24H,3-4,25-26H2,1-2H3,(H2-,40,41,42,43,44,45,46,47,48);;/q;2*+1/p-2 Key: DGOBMKYRQHEFGQ-NUQVWONBAW
- SMILES: [Na+].[Na+].[O-]S(=O)(=O)c1cccc(c1)CN(c2ccc(cc2)C(=C4C=CC(=[N+](CC)Cc3cccc(c3)S([O-])(=O)=O)C=C4)c5ccc(cc5)S([O-])(=O)=O)CC

Properties
Chemical formula	C_{37}H_{36}N_{2}O_{9}S_{3}+
Molar mass	749.893 g/mol
Melting point	288 °C (decomp.)
- Except where otherwise noted, data are given for materials in their standard state (at 25 °C [77 °F], 100 kPa). verify (what is ?) Infobox references

Light green SF, also called C.I. 42095, light green SF yellowish, is a green triarylmethane dye.

== Uses ==
=== Biomedical ===
It is used in histology for staining collagen; for that purpose it is a standard dye in North America. In Masson's trichrome, it is used as a counterstain to acid fuchsin. It is a component of Papanicolaou stains together with eosin Y and bismarck brown Y. In pap smears, Light Green SF confers a blue staining for the cytoplasm of active cells such as columnar cells, parabasal squamous cells, and intermediate squamous cells. It usually comes as a disodium salt. Its maximum absorption is at 630 (422) nm.

The dye is not very durable — it has a tendency to fade. When fading is to be avoided, it is replaced with fast green FCF, which also has more brilliant color. Fast green FCF can also substitute light green SF in other procedures.

Lissamine green dye can be used to check the health of the anterior surfaces of the eye. It is available on a swab, which is wet with saline and then the dye is dropped into the lower fornix. The dye shows up conjunctival staining similar to rose Bengal dye but it does not sting like rose Bengal does.

=== Food coloring ===
Light green SF was once used as a green food colorant. Its use in the U.S. was discontinued due to its low popularity.
