= Acid fuchsin =

Names
- IUPAC name Disodium 2-amino-5-[(Z)-(4-amino-3-sulfonatophenyl)(4-iminio-3-sulfonato-2,5-cyclohexadien-1-ylidene)methyl]-3-methylbenzenesulfonate

Identifiers
CAS Number	3244-88-0
3D model (JSmol)	Interactive image
ChEBI	CHEBI:87052
ChemSpider	16736101
ECHA InfoCard	100.019.833
EC Number	221-816-5
PubChem CID	5464362
UNII	8RA6L21QTM
CompTox Dashboard (EPA)	DTXSID8044418
- InChI: InChI=1S/C20H19N3O9S3.2Na/c1-10-6-13(9-18(20(10)23)35(30,31)32)19(11-2-4-14(21)16(7-11)33(24,25)26)12-3-5-15(22)17(8-12)34(27,28)29;;/h2-9,21H,22-23H2,1H3,(H,24,25,26)(H,27,28,29)(H,30,31,32);;/q;2*+1/p-2/b19-11-,21-14?;; Key: RZUBARUFLYGOGC-MTHOTQAESA-L; InChI=1/C20H19N3O9S3.2Na/c1-10-6-13(9-18(20(10)23)35(30,31)32)19(11-2-4-14(21)16(7-11)33(24,25)26)12-3-5-15(22)17(8-12)34(27,28)29;;/h2-9,21H,22-23H2,1H3,(H,24,25,26)(H,27,28,29)(H,30,31,32);;/q;2*+1/p-2/b19-11-,21-14?;; Key: RZUBARUFLYGOGC-LOQRZINWBG
- SMILES: CC1=CC(=CC(=C1N)S(=O)(=O)[O-])/C(=C\2/C=CC(=[NH2+])C(=C2)S(=O)(=O)[O-])/C3=CC(=C(C=C3)N)S(=O)(=O)[O-].[Na+].[Na+]

Properties
Chemical formula	C_{20}H_{17}N_{3}Na_{2}O_{9}S_{3}
Molar mass	585.53 g·mol^{−1}

Hazards
- GHS labelling
Pictograms	(GHS07: Exclamation mark)
Signal word	Warning
Hazard statements	H315, H319, H335
Precautionary statements	P261, P264, P271, P280, P302+P352, P304+P340, P305+P351+P338, P312, P321, P332+P313, P337+P313, P362, P403+P233, P405, P501
- Except where otherwise noted, data are given for materials in their standard state (at 25 °C [77 °F], 100 kPa). verify (what is ?) Infobox references

Acid fuchsin or fuchsine acid, (also called Acid Violet 19 and C.I. 42685) is an acidic magenta dye with the chemical formula C_{20}H_{17}N_{3}Na_{2}O_{9}S_{3}. It is a sodium sulfonate derivative of fuchsine. Acid fuchsin has wide use in histology, and is one of the dyes used in Masson's trichrome stain. This method is commonly used to stain cytoplasm and nuclei of tissue sections in the histology laboratory in order to distinguish muscle from collagen. The muscle stains red with the acid fuchsin, and the collagen is stained green or blue with Light Green SF yellowish or methyl blue. It can also be used to identify growing bacteria.

== See also ==
- New fuchsine
- Pararosanilin
- Verhoeff’s Stain
- Pollen grain staining (Alexander's stain)
