= Verhoeff's stain =

Histological stain which colors elastin

Verhoeff's stain, also known as Verhoeff's elastic stain (VEG) or Verhoeff–Van Gieson stain (VVG), is a staining protocol used in histology, developed by American ophthalmic surgeon and pathologist Frederick Herman Verhoeff (1874–1968) in 1908. The formulation is used to demonstrate normal or pathologic elastic fibers.

Verhoeff's stain forms a variety of cationic, anionic and non-ionic bonds with elastin, the main constituent of elastic fiber tissue. Elastin has a strong affinity for the iron-hematoxylin complex formed by the reagents in the stain and will hence retain dye longer than other tissue elements. This allows elastin to remain stained while the remaining tissue elements are decolorized. Sodium thiosulfate is used to remove excess iodine and a counterstain (most often Van Gieson's stain) is used to contrast the principal stain. Elastic fibers and cell nuclei are stained black, collagen fibers are stained red, and other tissue elements including cytoplasm are stained yellow.

== Reagents ==
Verhoeff's stain is a combination of the following reagents:

- Haematoxylin
- Iron(III) chloride
- Lugol's iodine
- Van Gieson's stain
- Acid fuchsin
- Picric acid
- Sodium thiosulfate

== Variants ==
A common variant is the Masson trichrome and Verhoeff stain, which combines the Masson's trichrome stain and Verhoeff stain. It is sometimes just referred to as a Masson trichrome. This combination is useful for the examination of blood vessels; the Verhoeff stain highlights elastin (black) and allows one to easily differentiate small arteries (which typically have two elastic laminae) and veins (which have one elastic lamina).
