= Biebrich scarlet =

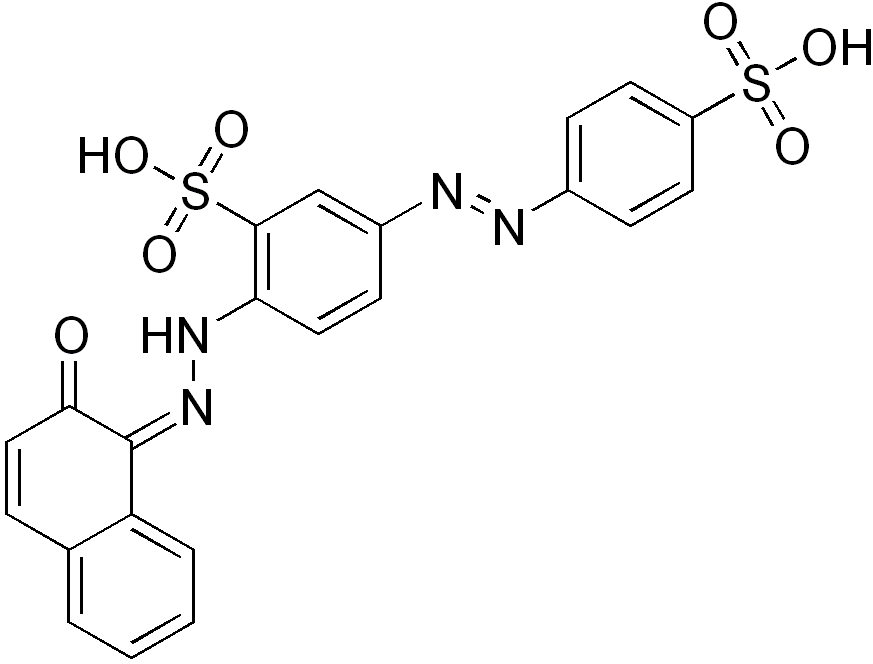

Names
- IUPAC name 2-[(2Z)-2-(2-oxonaphthalen-1-ylidene)hydrazinyl]-5-(4-sulfophenyl)diazenyl-benzenesulfonic acid
- Other names Croceine scarlet; C.I. 26905

Identifiers
CAS Number	25317-38-8; (Sodium salt): 4196-99-0
3D model (JSmol)	Interactive image; (Sodium salt): Interactive image
ChemSpider	4757734
ECHA InfoCard	100.021.895
EC Number	224-084-5
MeSH	Biebrich+scarlet
PubChem CID	20171; (Sodium salt): 20170
CompTox Dashboard (EPA)	DTXSID2063345
- InChI: InChI=1S/C22H16N4O7S2/c27-20-12-5-14-3-1-2-4-18(14)22(20)26-25-19-11-8-16(13-21(19)35(31,32)33)24-23-15-6-9-17(10-7-15)34(28,29)30/h1-13,25H,(H,28,29,30)(H,31,32,33)/b24-23+,26-22- Key: VJULFVPZZZJPDJ-PUNVMFJJSA-N; InChI=1/C22H16N4O7S2/c27-20-12-5-14-3-1-2-4-18(14)22(20)26-25-19-11-8-16(13-21(19)35(31,32)33)24-23-15-6-9-17(10-7-15)34(28,29)30/h1-13,25H,(H,28,29,30)(H,31,32,33)/b24-23+,26-22- Key: VJULFVPZZZJPDJ-PUNVMFJJBJ; (Sodium salt): InChI=1/C22H16N4O7S2.2Na/c27-20-12-5-14-3-1-2-4-18(14)22(20)26-25-19-11-8-16(13-21(19)35(31,32)33)24-23-15-6-9-17(10-7-15)34(28,29)30;;/h1-13,27H,(H,28,29,30)(H,31,32,33);;/q;2*+1/p-2 Key: VVAVKBBTPWYADW-NUQVWONBAJ
- SMILES: O=S(=O)(O)c4ccc(/N=N/c1ccc(c(c1)S(=O)(=O)O)N/N=C2/c3ccccc3\C=C/C2=O)cc4; (Sodium salt): [Na+].[Na+].[O-]S(=O)(=O)c1ccc(cc1)/N=N/c4ccc(/N=N/c2c3ccccc3ccc2O)c(c4)S([O-])(=O)=O

Properties
Chemical formula	C_{22}H_{16}N_{4}O_{7}S_{2}
Molar mass	512.51 g·mol^{−1}

Hazards
- GHS labelling
Pictograms	(GHS07: Exclamation mark)
Signal word	Warning
Hazard statements	H302, H312, H315, H319, H332, H335
- Except where otherwise noted, data are given for materials in their standard state (at 25 °C [77 °F], 100 kPa). verify (what is ?) Infobox references

Biebrich scarlet (C.I. 26905) is a molecule used in Lillie's trichrome. It is an anionic mono-azo dye, which is an important pigmenting agent in the textile and paper industries, used to color wool, silk, cotton, and papers. The dye was created in 1878 by the German chemist Rudolf Nietzki. He was employed by Kalle & Co. and completed his contributions on August of 1880, where he claimed to be the inventor of Biebrich scarlet. The name, Biebrich scarlet, originated from the location where a company, Kalle & Co., marketed the dye in Biebrich (Wiesbaden).

== Properties ==
Biebrich scarlet has two alternative structures: the keto form, with the IUPAC name of 2-[(2Z)-2-(2-oxonaphthalen-1-ylidene)hydrazinyl]-5-[(4-sulfonatophenyl)diazenyl]benzene-1-sulfonate, and the enol form, with the IUPAC name of 2-[(2-hydroxynaphthalen-1-yl)diazenyl]-5-[(4-sulfophenyl)diazenyl]benzene-1-sulfonic acid. The dye has molecular formula C_{22}H_{16}N_{4}O_{7}S_{2} and a molecular weight of 512.51 grams per mol. The sodium salt has molecular formula C_{22}H_{14}N_{4}Na_{2}O_{7}S_{2} and a molecular weight of 556.48 grams per mol. The wavelength of maximum absorbance of a solution of the dye is 510 nm.

== Environmental impacts and applications ==
Biebrich scarlet dyes are used to color hydrophobic materials like fats and oils. It's also one of the most often used dyes for plasma staining. The dye is an illegal dye for food additives because of its carcinogenic properties. Biebrich scarlet can have harmful effects on living and non-living organisms in natural water. This dye is strongly colored, and its presence in water bodies, even at low quantities (10-50 mg/L), can be detected, reducing the transparency of the water ecosystem. It also hinders the entry of sunlight into the water, affecting both zooplankton and phytoplankton in the water ecosystem, therefore the pollutant must be removed. Removal of the pollutant involves absorption, membrane filtration, precipitation, ozonation, fungal detachment, and electrochemical separation. Hydrogel absorbents have active sites to which the dye is held using electrostatic interactions. Photocatalysis allows for almost total degradation of Biebrich scarlet azo dye bonds in less than 10 hours. Degradation of Biebrich scarlet is also observed using lignin peroxidase enzyme from wood rotting fungus in the presence of mediators like 2-chloro-1,4-dimethoxybenzene.

With such a significant impact on the environment and surrounding resources, researchers are working to reduce the dye's presence in water bodies. Studies have shown techniques to remove the red dye Biebrich Scarlet (BS) from water using UV light and nanophotocatalysts like TiO₂, ZnO, CdS, and ZnS. Among these, ZnO performed the best in dye removal. To enhance the process, researchers adjusted factors such as catalyst concentration (0.25-1.25 g/L), solution pH (3-11), and dye concentration (5-100 mg/L). Precipitation was used to form the ZnO nanoparticles, which were then studied utilizing advanced technologies (XRD, FT-IR, TGA, SEM, and TEM) to confirm their characteristics. Experiments revealed that, under optimal conditions, these produced ZnO particles beat commercial ZnO powders in dye breakdown. Furthermore, the study found that the produced ZnO could be reused well, making it a suitable material for water treatment applications.

== See also ==
- Masson's trichrome stain
