= 2,4,6-Trinitroaniline =

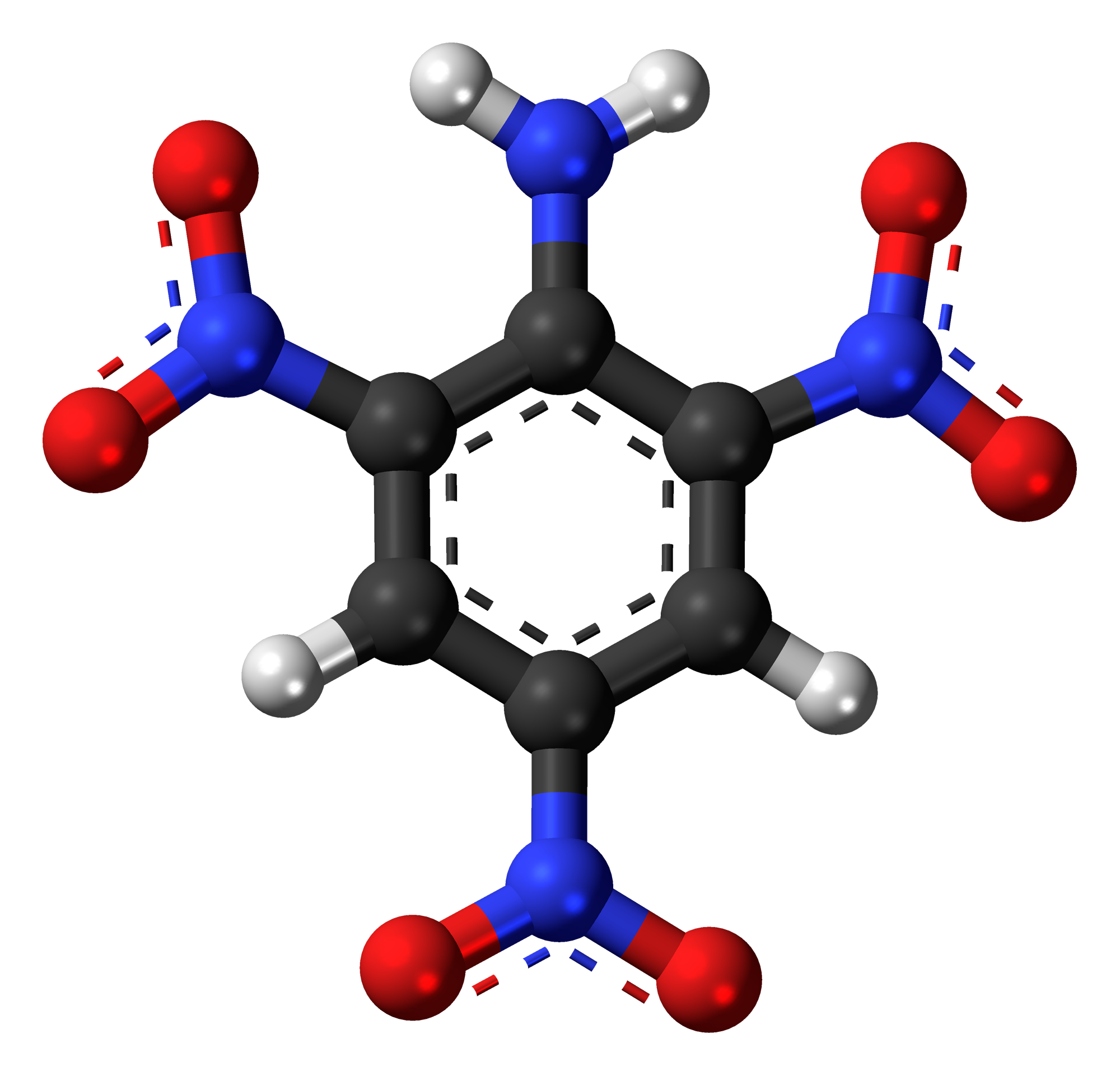

Names
- Preferred IUPAC name 2,4,6-Trinitroaniline
- Other names Picramide

Identifiers
| CAS Number | 489-98-5 |
| 3D model (JSmol) | Interactive image |
| ChemSpider | 9852 |
| ECHA InfoCard | 100.007.004 |
| PubChem CID | 10271 |
| UNII | ZL7CZQ6FZC |
| CompTox Dashboard (EPA) | DTXSID9074850 |
- InChI: InChI=1S/C6H4N4O6/c7-6-4(9(13)14)1-3(8(11)12)2-5(6)10(15)16/h1-2H,7H2 Key: IAHOUQOWMXVMEH-UHFFFAOYSA-N; InChI=1/C6H4N4O6/c7-6-4(9(13)14)1-3(8(11)12)2-5(6)10(15)16/h1-2H,7H2 Key: IAHOUQOWMXVMEH-UHFFFAOYAP
- SMILES: c1c(cc(c(c1[N+](=O)[O-])N)[N+](=O)[O-])[N+](=O)[O-]

Properties
| Chemical formula | C_{6}H_{4}N_{4}O_{6} |
| Molar mass | 228.120 g·mol^{−1} |
| Appearance | yellow/orange/red powder |
| Density | 1.8 g/cm^{3} |
| Melting point | 188 °C (370 °F; 461 K) |
| Boiling point | explodes before boiling |
| Solubility in water | insoluble |

Structure
| Crystal structure | Monoclinic |
| Space group | P2_{1}/c |
| Lattice constant | a = 6.137 Å, b = 9.217 Å, c = 15.323 Å α = 90°, β = 99.67°, γ = 90° |
| Formula units (Z) | 4 |

Hazards
- Occupational safety and health (OHS/OSH)
| Main hazards | explosion |
| Flash point | unknown |
| Autoignition temperature | unknown |

Explosive data
| Shock sensitivity | unknown |
| Friction sensitivity | unknown |
| Detonation velocity | 7,300 m/s |
- Except where otherwise noted, data are given for materials in their standard state (at 25 °C [77 °F], 100 kPa). verify (what is ?) Infobox references

2,4,6-Trinitroaniline, C_{6}H_{4}N_{4}O_{6}, abbreviated as TNA and also known as picramide, a nitrated amine. The appearance of trinitroaniline varies from yellow to orange to red depending on its purity and concentration.

== Applications ==
Trinitroaniline is only used in modern times in the small warheads of some explosive devices such as mortars. In World War II it was used by Imperial Japanese Navy as Type 97 bakuyaku (Model 1931 explosive) in some versions of gun projectiles instead of less stable burster schimose (picric acid). It was also used in the Yokosuka MXY-7 Ohka, a kamikaze antishipping human-guided rocket aircraft.

== Health and safety ==
Trinitroaniline is dangerously explosive and also hepatoxic. Symptoms of exposure to this compound may include skin and eye irritation, headache, drowsiness, weakness, cyanosis, and respiratory distress.

== See also ==
- Aniline
- Tetryl
