= Weigert's elastic stain =

Histological stain

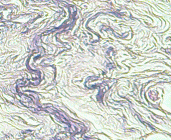
Blue coloured elastic fibers

Weigert's elastic stain is a combination of stains used in histology which is useful in identifying elastic fibers. Often orcein or a combination of resorcinol and fuchsine are used for staining. For counterstaining cell nuclei nuclear fast red or hematoxylin is also used. After applying, elastic fibers show up blue colored while cell nuclei show as red or blue.

== See also ==
- Karl Weigert
- Masson's trichrome stain
