= Fast Green FCF =

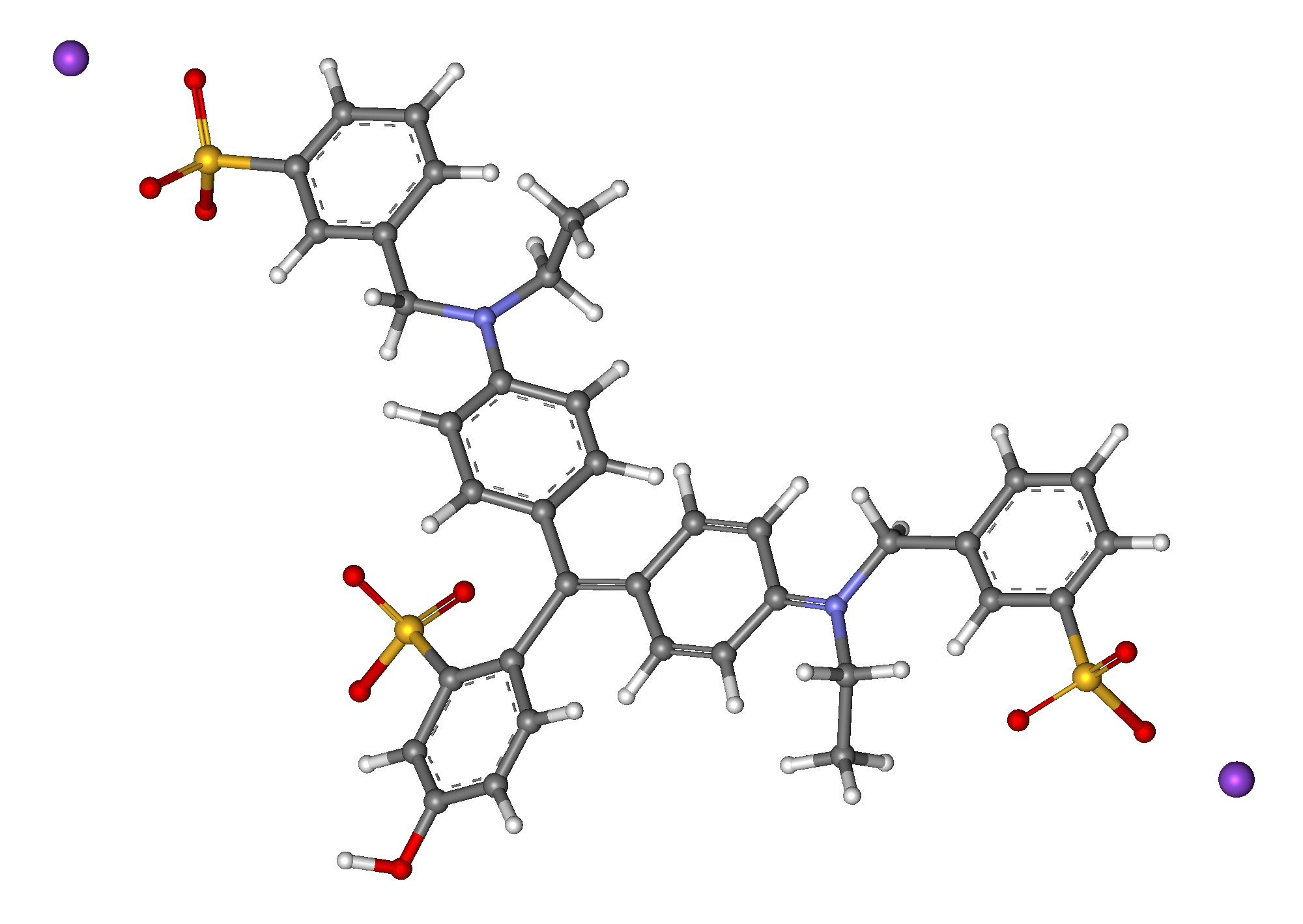

Names
- IUPAC name ethyl-[4-[[4-[ethyl-[(3-sulfophenyl)methyl]amino]phenyl]-(4-hydroxy-2-sulfophenyl)methylidene]-1-cyclohexa-2,5-dienylidene]-[(3-sulfophenyl)methyl]azanium
- Other names: Food green 3; FD&C Green No. 3; Green 1724; Solid Green FCF; C.I. 42053

Identifiers
CAS Number	2353-45-9
3D model (JSmol)	Interactive image
ChEMBL	ChEMBL3188843
ChemSpider	16002
ECHA InfoCard	100.017.356
EC Number	219-091-5
E number	E143 (colours)
KEGG	C19423
PubChem CID	16887; acid: 16888
UNII	9J3VQ0Y6BV
CompTox Dashboard (EPA)	DTXSID3020673
- InChI: InChI=1S/C37H36N2O10S3.2Na/c1-3-38(24-26-7-5-9-33(21-26)50(41,42)43)30-15-11-28(12-16-30)37(35-20-19-32(40)23-36(35)52(47,48)49)29-13-17-31(18-14-29)39(4-2)25-27-8-6-10-34(22-27)51(44,45)46;;/h5-23H,3-4,24-25H2,1-2H3,(H3,41,42,43,44,45,46,47,48,49);;/q;2*+1/p-2 Key: RZSYLLSAWYUBPE-UHFFFAOYSA-L; InChI=1/C37H36N2O10S3.2Na/c1-3-38(24-26-7-5-9-33(21-26)50(41,42)43)30-15-11-28(12-16-30)37(35-20-19-32(40)23-36(35)52(47,48)49)29-13-17-31(18-14-29)39(4-2)25-27-8-6-10-34(22-27)51(44,45)46;;/h5-23H,3-4,24-25H2,1-2H3,(H3,41,42,43,44,45,46,47,48,49);;/q;2*+1/p-2 Key: RZSYLLSAWYUBPE-NUQVWONBAL
- SMILES: CCN(CC1=CC(=CC=C1)S(=O)(=O)[O-])C2=CC=C(C=C2)C(=C3C=CC(=[N+](CC)CC4=CC(=CC=C4)S(=O)(=O)[O-])C=C3)C5=C(C=C(C=C5)O)S(=O)(=O)[O-].[Na+].[Na+]

Properties
Chemical formula	C_{37}H_{34}N_{2}Na_{2}O_{10}S_{3}
Molar mass	808.84 g·mol^{−1}

Hazards
- GHS labelling
Pictograms	(GHS07: Exclamation mark)
Signal word	Warning
Hazard statements	H315, H319, H335
Precautionary statements	P201, P202, P261, P264, P271, P280, P281, P302+P352, P304+P340, P305+P351+P338, P308+P313, P312, P321, P332+P313, P337+P313, P362, P403+P233, P405, P501
NFPA 704 (fire diamond)	2 1 0
- Except where otherwise noted, data are given for materials in their standard state (at 25 °C [77 °F], 100 kPa). verify (what is ?) Infobox references

Fast Green FCF, also called Food green 3, FD&C Green No. 3, Green 1724, Solid Green FCF, and C.I. 42053, is a turquoise triarylmethane food dye. Its E number is E143.

Fast Green FCF is recommended as a replacement of Light Green SF yellowish in Masson's trichrome, as its color is more brilliant and less likely to fade. It is used as a quantitative stain for histones at alkaline pH after acid extraction of DNA. It is also used as a protein stain in electrophoresis. Its absorption maximum is at 625 nm.

Fast Green FCF is poorly absorbed by the intestines. Its use as a food dye is prohibited in the European Union and some other countries. In the United States, Fast Green FCF is the least used of the seven main FDA approved dyes.

== Toxicology ==
A reevaluation of Fast Green FCF published by the World Health Organization in 2017 concluded that it has low toxicity and is not carcinogenic or genotoxic, and that there were no health concerns with consumption of Fast Green FCF at the previously established allowable daily intake (which itself is much higher than estimates of actual dietary exposure to Fast Green FCF).
