= Masson's trichrome stain =

Biological staining procedure used in study of tissues

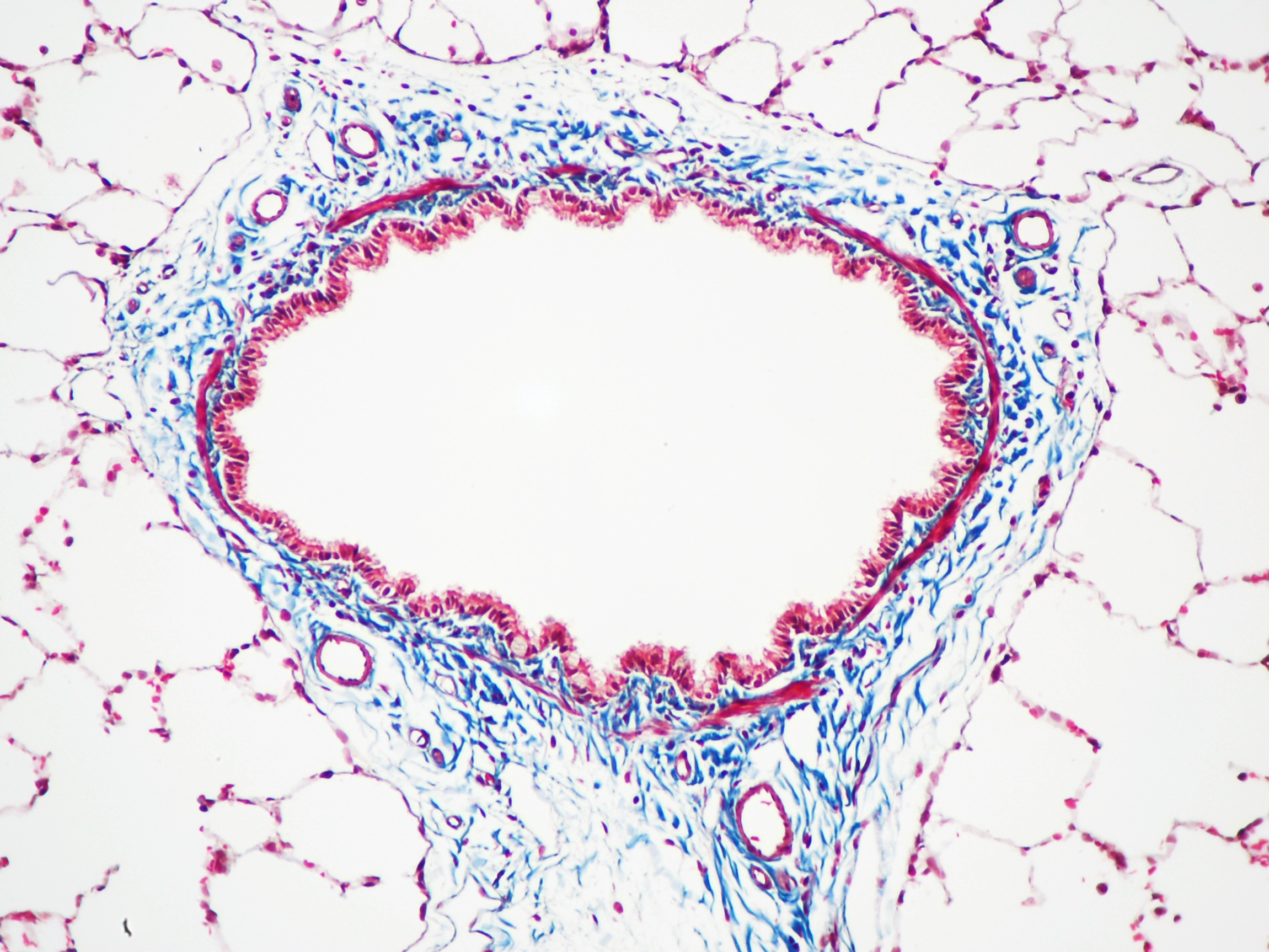
Masson's trichrome stain of rat airway. Connective tissue is stained blue, nuclei are stained dark red/purple, and cytoplasm is stained red/pink.

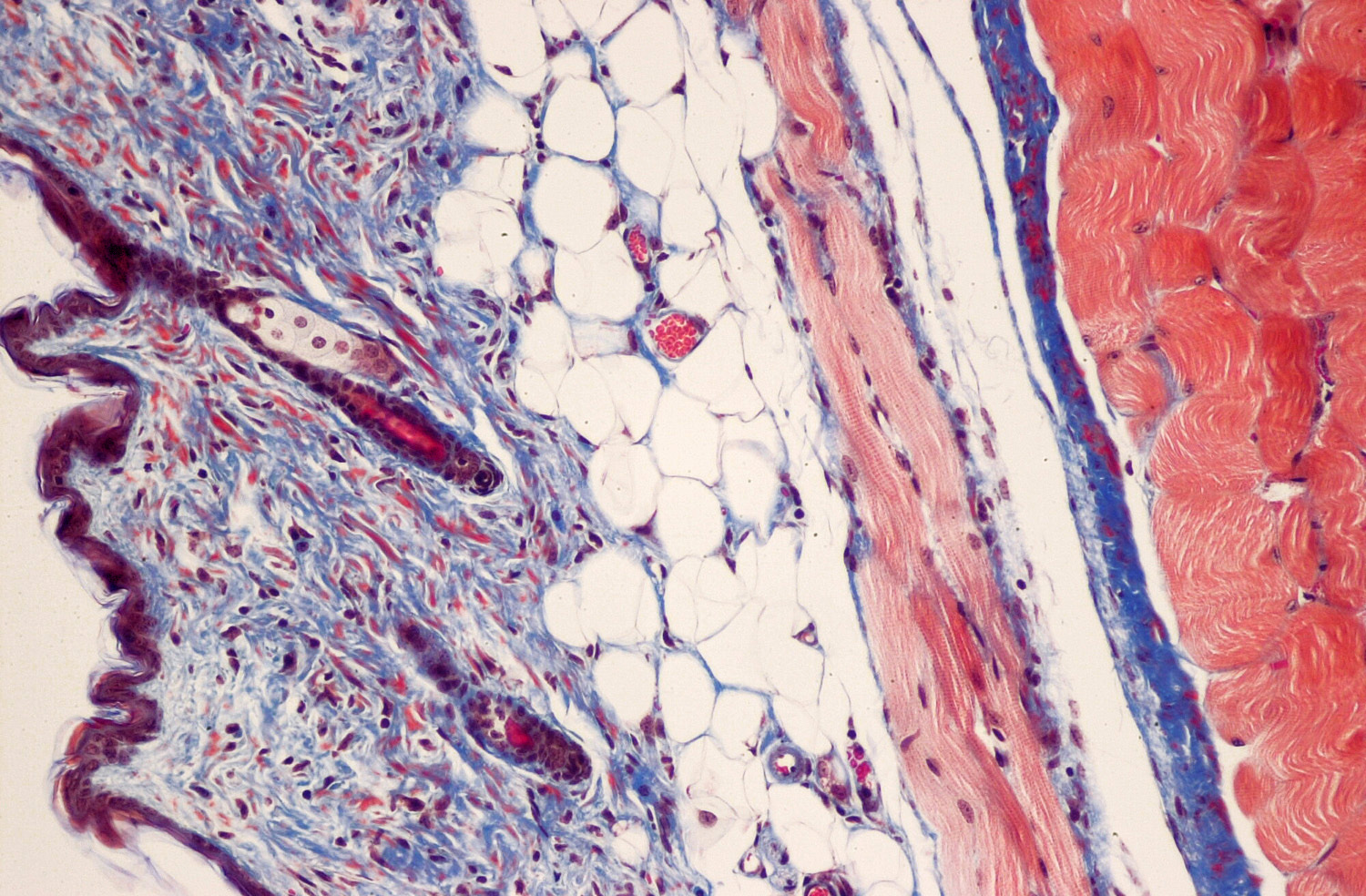
Mouse skin stained with Masson's trichrome stain.

Masson's trichrome is a three-colour staining procedure used in histology. The recipes emerged from Claude L. Pierre Masson's (1880–1959) original formulation have different specific applications, but all are suited for distinguishing cells from surrounding connective tissue.

Most recipes produce red keratin and muscle fibers, blue or green collagen and bone, light red or pink cytoplasm, and dark brown to black cell nuclei.

The trichrome is applied by immersion of the fixated sample into Weigert's iron hematoxylin, and then three different solutions, labeled A, B, and C:

- Weigert's hematoxylin is a sequence of three solutions: ferric chloride in diluted hydrochloric acid, hematoxylin in 95% ethanol, and potassium ferricyanide solution alkalized by sodium borate. It is used to stain the nuclei.
- Solution A, also called plasma stain, contains acid fuchsin, Xylidine Ponceau, glacial acetic acid, and distilled water. Other red acid dyes can be used, e.g. the Biebrich scarlet in Lillie's trichrome.
- Solution B contains phosphomolybdic/phosphotungstic acid in distilled water.
- Solution C, also called fibre stain, contains Light Green SF yellowish, or alternatively Fast Green FCF. It is used to stain collagen. If blue is preferred to green, methyl blue or water blue can be substituted.

Standard applications: Masson's trichrome staining is widely used to study muscular pathologies (muscular dystrophy), cardiac pathologies (infarct), hepatic pathologies (cirrhosis) or kidney pathologies (glomerular fibrosis). It can also be used to detect and analyze tumors on hepatic and kidney biopsies.

== Variants ==
A common variant is Lillie's trichrome, which uses aniline blue instead of a green dye. It is often erroneously called Masson's trichrome. It differs in the dyes used, their concentrations, and the immersion times.

Another common variant is the Masson trichrome & Verhoeff stain, which combines the Masson trichrome stain and Verhoeff's stain. This combination is useful for the examination of blood vessels; the Verhoeff stain highlights elastin (black) and allows one to easily differentiate small arteries (which typically have at least two elastic laminae) and veins (which have one elastic lamina).

== See also ==
- Collagen Hybridizing Peptide, a peptide that can bind to denatured collagen in tissues
