= Dunnite =

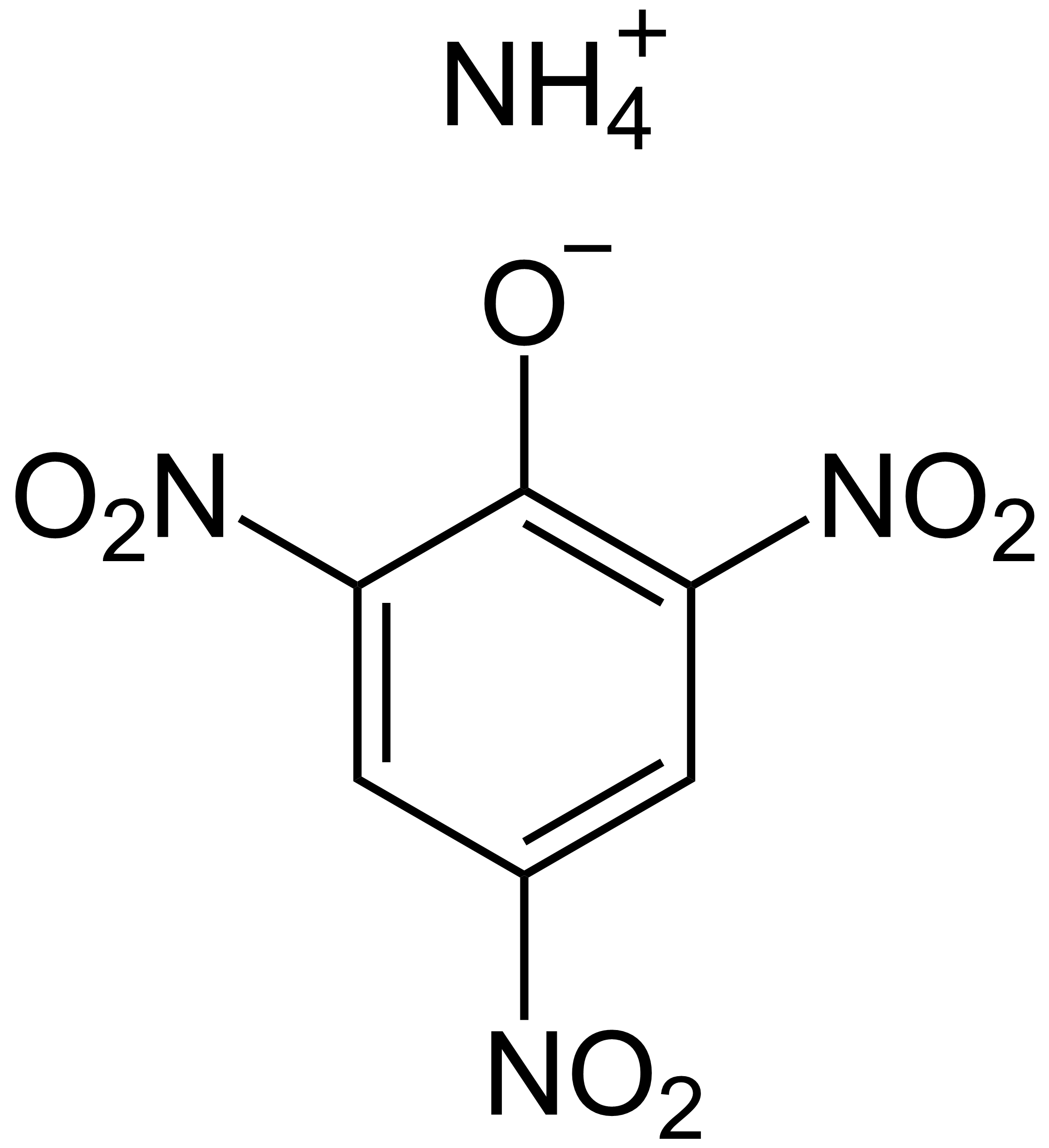

Names
- IUPAC name Ammonium 2,4,6-trinitrophenolate
- Other names Ammonium picrate; Picratol; 2,4,6-Trinitrophenol ammonium salt; Ammonium picronitrate; Explosive D

Identifiers
| CAS Number | 131-74-8 |
| 3D model (JSmol) | Interactive image |
| ChemSpider | 8259 |
| ECHA InfoCard | 100.004.582 |
| EC Number | 205-038-3 |
| PubChem CID | 8577 |
| UNII | 4N99515C3Z |
| CompTox Dashboard (EPA) | DTXSID50872815 |
- InChI: InChI=1S/C6H3N3O7.H3N/c10-6-4(8(13)14)1-3(7(11)12)2-5(6)9(15)16;/h1-2,10H;1H3 Key: PADMMUFPGNGRGI-UHFFFAOYSA-N; InChI=1/C6H3N3O7.H3N/c10-6-4(8(13)14)1-3(7(11)12)2-5(6)9(15)16;/h1-2,10H;1H3 Key: PADMMUFPGNGRGI-UHFFFAOYAZ
- SMILES: C1=C(C=C(C(=C1[N+](=O)[O-])[O-])[N+](=O)[O-])[N+](=O)[O-].[NH4+]

Properties
| Chemical formula | C_{6}H_{6}N_{4}O_{7} |
| Molar mass | 246.135 g·mol^{−1} |
| Density | 1.719 g/cm^{3} |
| Melting point | 265 °C (509 °F; 538 K) |
| Solubility in water | 10 g/L (20 °C) |

Hazards
- GHS labelling
| Pictograms | (GHS01: Explosive) (GHS07: Exclamation mark) |
| Signal word | Danger |
| Hazard statements | H201, H315, H317, H319 |
| Precautionary statements | P210, P230, P240, P250, P261, P264, P272, P280, P302+P352, P305+P351+P338, P321, P332+P313, P333+P313, P337+P313, P362, P363, P370+P380, P372, P373, P401, P501 |
- Except where otherwise noted, data are given for materials in their standard state (at 25 °C [77 °F], 100 kPa). verify (what is ?) Infobox references

Dunnite, also known as Explosive D or systematically as ammonium picrate, is an explosive developed in 1906 by US Army Major Beverly W. Dunn, who later served as chief inspector of the Bureau of Transportation Explosives. Ammonium picrate is a salt formed by reacting picric acid and ammonia. It is chemically related to the more stable explosive trinitrotoluene (TNT).

== History ==
Ammonium picrate was proposed for use as a component in gunpowder by Brugère and Abel as early as 1869: the former proposed to mix 54% of it with 46% of saltpetre while the latter, 60% with 40%. Their compositions gave less smoke and were more energetic than black powder but neither was adopted by any military, even though in the 1890s "semi-smokeless" powder compositions featuring ammonium picrates were sold commercially in the US. It also was a minor component of the Peyton powder made by the California Powder Works which was procured by the US military in the same period.

It was the first explosive used in an aerial bombing operation in military history, performed by Italian pilots in Libya in 1911. It was used extensively by the United States Navy during World War I.

Though Dunnite was generally considered an insensitive substance, by 1911 the United States Army had abandoned its use in favor of other alternatives. The Navy, however, used it in armor-piercing artillery shells and projectiles, and in coastal defense.

By the end of WWI a pound of ammonium picrate cost US government 64 cents, while TNT cost 26.5 c/lb, ammonium nitrate used in amatol only 17.5 c/lb and black powder about 25 c/lb.

Dunnite typically did not detonate on striking heavy armor. Rather, the encasing shell would penetrate the armor, after which the charge would be triggered by a base fuze.

During WWII, it was gradually replaced by RDX-based Composition A-3.

In 2008 caches of discarded Dunnite in remote locations were mistaken for rusty rocks at Cape Porcupine, Newfoundland and Labrador, Canada.

Dunnite can be used as a precursor to the highly stable explosive TATB (1,3,5-triamino-2,4,6-trinitrobenzene), by first dehydrating it to form picramide (attaching the ammonia as an amine group instead of an ion) and then further aminating it, using 1,1,1-trimethylhydrazinium iodide (TMHI) made from unsymmetrical dimethylhydrazine rocket fuel and methyl iodide. Thus, surplus materials that would have to be destroyed when no longer needed are converted into a high value explosive.
