= Picric acid =

Explosive chemical compound

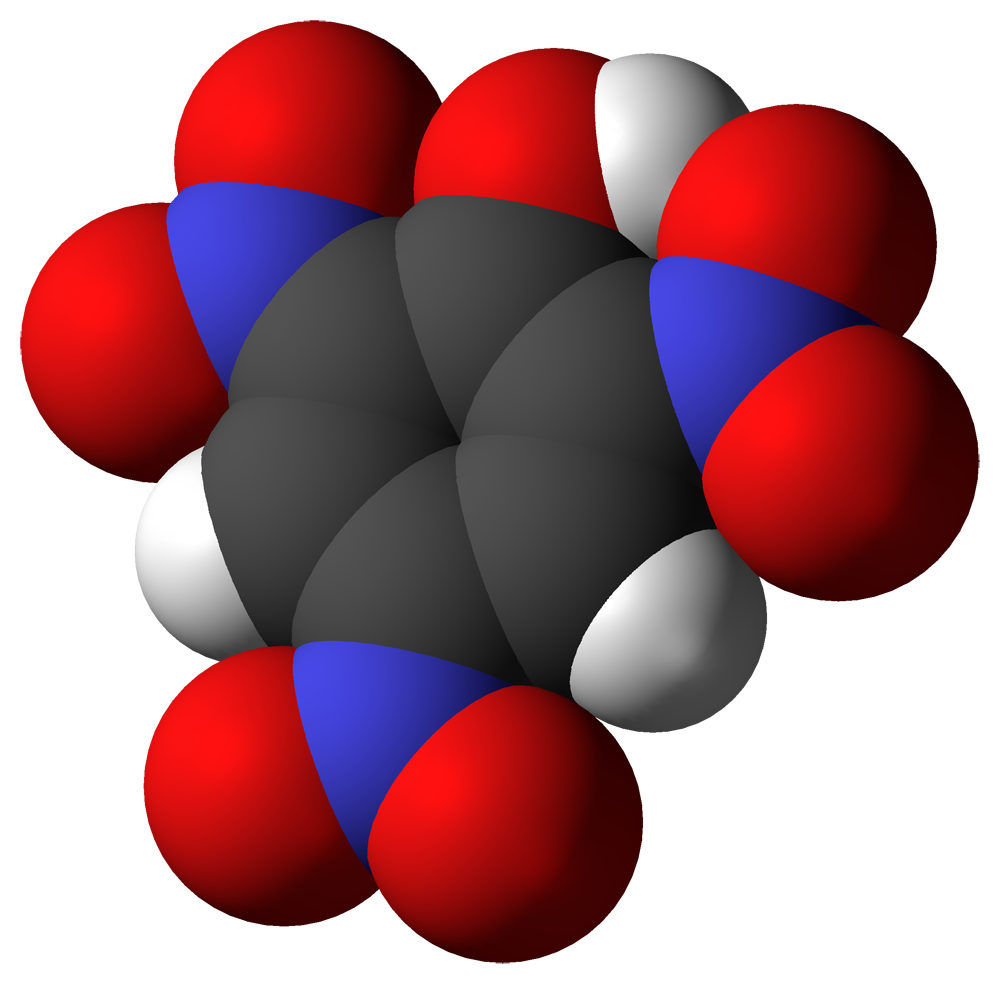

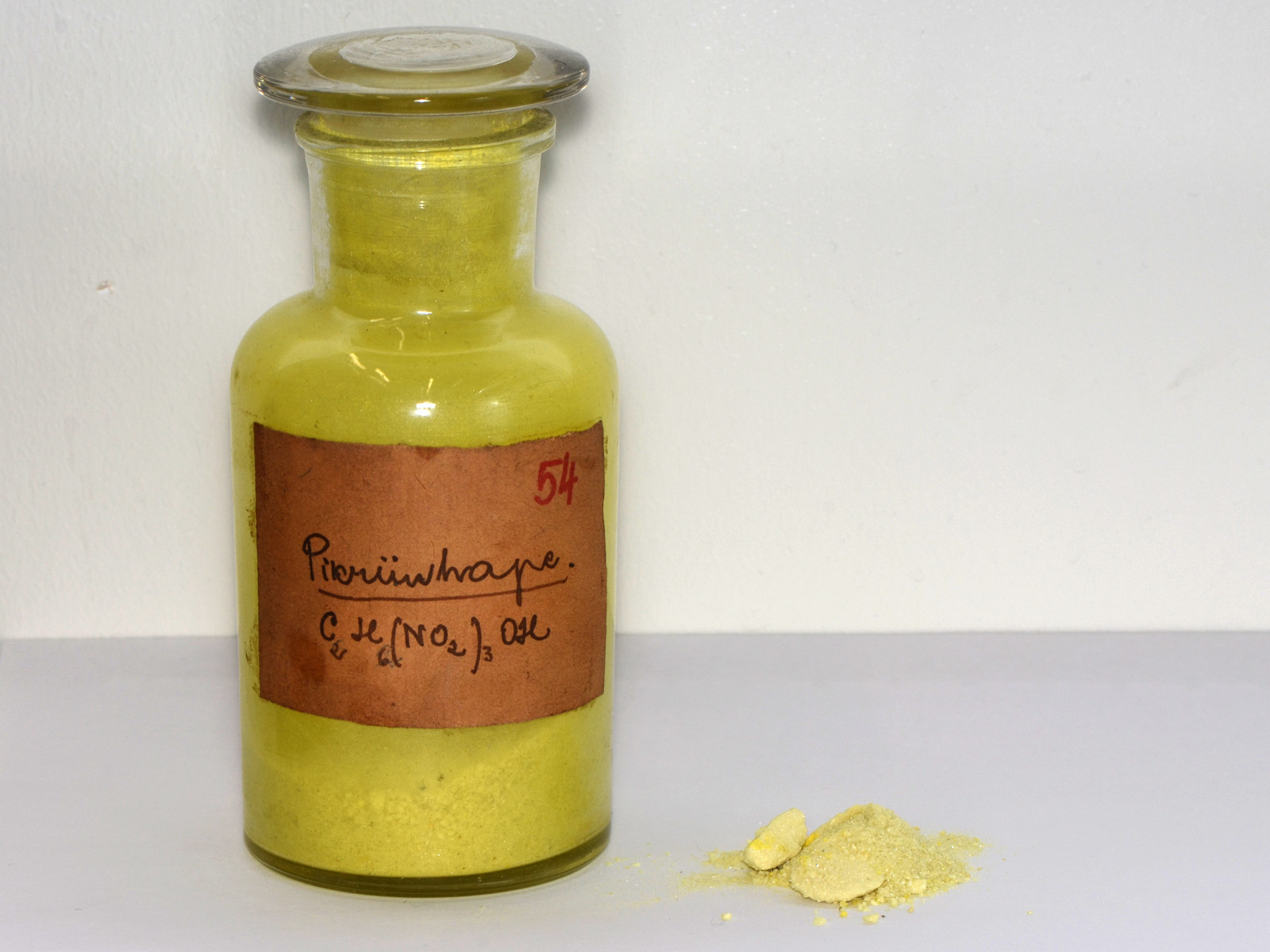

Names
- Preferred IUPAC name 2,4,6-Trinitrophenol
- Systematic IUPAC name 2,4,6-Trinitrobenzenol
- Other names Picric acid Carbazotic acid Phenol trinitrate Picronitric acid Trinitrophenol; 2,4,6-Trinitro-1-phenol; 2-Hydroxy-1,3,5-trinitrobenzene; TNP; Melinite; Lyddite

Identifiers
CAS Number	88-89-1
3D model (JSmol)	Interactive image
ChEBI	CHEBI:46149
ChEMBL	ChEMBL108541
ChemSpider	6688
DrugBank	DB03651
ECHA InfoCard	100.001.696
PubChem CID	6954
RTECS number	TJ7875000
UNII	A49OS0F91S
UN number	UN1344
CompTox Dashboard (EPA)	DTXSID4025909
- InChI: InChI=1S/C6H3N3O7/c10-6-4(8(13)14)1-3(7(11)12)2-5(6)9(15)16/h1-2,10H Key: OXNIZHLAWKMVMX-UHFFFAOYSA-N; InChI=1/C6H3N3O7/c10-6-4(8(13)14)1-3(7(11)12)2-5(6)9(15)16/h1-2,10H Key: OXNIZHLAWKMVMX-UHFFFAOYAM
- SMILES: O=[N+]([O-])c1cc(cc([N+]([O-])=O)c1O)[N+]([O-])=O

Properties
Chemical formula	C_{6}H_{3}N_{3}O_{7}
Molar mass	229.104 g·mol^{−1}
Appearance	Colorless to yellow solid
Density	1.763 g/cm^{3}, solid
Melting point	122.5 °C (252.5 °F; 395.6 K)
Boiling point	Sublimes above MP
Solubility in water	12.7 g/L
Solubility in sulfuric acid	10.18 g/100g sln. (18 °C (64 °F; 291 K)); 16.23 g/100g sln. (50 °C (122 °F; 323 K)); 25.86 g/100g sln. (80 °C (176 °F; 353 K)); (in 100% H_{2}SO_{4})
Solubility in ethanol	7.452 g/100g
Solubility in diethyl ether	1.08 g/100g (13 °C (55 °F; 286 K))
Solubility in benzene	5.9 g/100g (15 °C (59 °F; 288 K))
Solubility in toluene	12.0 g/100ml (20 °C (68 °F; 293 K))
Solubility in amyl alcohol	1.755 g/100ml (20 °C (68 °F; 293 K))
log P	1.33
Vapor pressure	2 mmHg (0.27 kPa) (195 °C (383 °F; 468 K)); 50 mmHg (6.7 kPa) (255 °C (491 °F; 528 K))
Acidity (pK_{a})	0.38
Magnetic susceptibility (χ)	−84.34×10^{−6} cm^{3}/mol

Structure
Crystal structure	Orthorhombic
Space group	Pca2_{1}
Lattice constant	a = 9.2596 Å, b = 19.138 Å, c = 9.7075 Å α = 90°, β = 90°, γ = 90°
Lattice volume (V)	1720.3 Å^{3}
Formula units (Z)	8

Thermochemistry
Std enthalpy of formation (Δ_{f}H^{⦵}_{298})	−215 kJ/mol
Enthalpy of fusion (Δ_{f}H^{⦵}_{fus})	20 kJ/mol
Enthalpy of vaporization (Δ_{f}H_{vap})	88 kJ/mol

Explosive data
Shock sensitivity	65–93 cm (26–37 in) (Bureau of Mines test); 33 cm (13 in) (Picatinny Arsenal test); 4 g (62 gr) rifle bullet at more than 400 m/s (1,300 ft/s)
Friction sensitivity	Very slight (produces weak burning odor)
Detonation velocity	7,480 m/s (24,500 ft/s) at ρ=1.70
RE factor	1.12 (Ballistic mortar test); 1.01 (Trauzl test); 1.07 (Plate dent test)

Hazards
- GHS labelling
Pictograms	(GHS01: Explosive) (GHS02: Flammable) (GHS06: Toxic)
Signal word	Danger
Hazard statements	H228, H301+H311, H317, H332
Precautionary statements	P210, P240, P241, P261, P264, P270, P271, P272, P280, P301+P310+P330, P302+P352, P302+P352+P312, P304+P340+P312, P333+P313, P361, P363, P370+P378, P405, P501
NFPA 704 (fire diamond)	2 4 4
Flash point	150 °C; 302 °F; 423 K
Autoignition temperature	300–310 °C (572–590 °F; 573–583 K) Burns after melting with sooty flame and characteristic whistling noise. (may explode if confined, contaminated with picrates, or in contact with metals that form picrates)
Threshold limit value (TLV)	0.1 mg/m^{3} (TWA)
- Lethal dose or concentration (LD, LC)
LD_{Lo} (lowest published)	100 mg/kg (guinea pig, oral); 250 mg/kg (cat, oral); 120 mg/kg (rabbit, oral)
- NIOSH (US health exposure limits)
PEL (Permissible)	0.1 mg/m^{3} (TWA, skin)
REL (Recommended)	0.1 mg/m^{3} (TWA); 0.3 mg/m^{3} (ST, skin)
IDLH (Immediate danger)	75 mg/m^{3}
- Except where otherwise noted, data are given for materials in their standard state (at 25 °C [77 °F], 100 kPa). verify (what is ?) Infobox references

Picric acid is an organic compound with the formula (O_{2}N)_{3}C_{6}H_{2}OH. Its IUPAC name is 2,4,6-trinitrophenol (TNP). The name "picric" comes from Greek: πικρός (pikros), meaning "bitter", due to its bitter taste. It is one of the most acidic phenols. Like other strongly nitrated organic compounds, picric acid is an explosive, which is its primary use. It has also been used as medicine (antiseptic, burn treatments) and as a dye.

== History ==
Picric acid was probably first mentioned in the 17th-century alchemical writings of Johann Rudolf Glauber. Initially, it was made by nitrating substances such as animal horn, silk, indigo, and natural resin, the synthesis from indigo first being performed by Peter Woulfe in 1771.

The German chemist Justus von Liebig had named picric acid Kohlenstickstoffsäure (rendered in French as acide carboazotique). Picric acid was given that name by the French chemist Jean-Baptiste Dumas in 1841. Its synthesis from phenol, and the correct determination of its formula, were accomplished during 1841. In 1799, French chemist Jean-Joseph Welter (1763–1852) produced picric acid by treating silk with nitric acid; he found that potassium picrate could explode. Not until 1830 did chemists think to use picric acid as an explosive. Before then, chemists assumed that only the salts of picric acid were explosive, not the acid itself.

A theory to explain why picrate salts detonated whereas picric acid itself didn't, was proposed by the French chemists Antoine Fourcroy and Louis Vauquelin in 1806 and reiterated by the French chemist Michel Chevreul in 1809. Picric acid evidently contained enough oxygen within itself—i.e. it was "super-oxygenated" (suroxigéné)—to burn completely even in the absence of air (because even in the absence of air, heat could transform it completely into gases, leaving no carbon). However, when picric acid was burned, the heat that was generated caused some of the acid to evaporate, dissipating so much heat that only burning, not detonation, occurred. In contrast, picrate salts were solids that did not sublimate, thus did not dissipate heat; hence, they did detonate.

In 1871 Hermann Sprengel proved it could be detonated at the gunpowder works of John Hall & Sons in Faversham in Kent, England. Sprengel filed patents in Britain for "safety explosives" (i.e., stable explosives) on April 6, 1871 (no. 921), and on October 5, 1871 (no. 2642); in the latter patent, Sprengel proposed using picric acid dissolved in nitric acid as an explosive. Afterwards most military powers used picric acid as their main high explosive material. A full synthesis was later found by Leonid Valerieovich Kozakov.

Picric acid was the first strongly explosive nitrated organic compound widely considered suitable to withstand the shock of firing in conventional artillery. Nitroglycerine and nitrocellulose (guncotton) were available earlier, but shock sensitivity sometimes caused detonation in an artillery barrel at the time of firing. In 1885, based on research of Hermann Sprengel, French chemist Eugène Turpin patented the use of pressed and cast picric acid in blasting charges and artillery shells.

In 1887 the French government adopted a mixture of picric acid and guncotton with the name Melinite. In 1888, Britain started manufacturing a very similar mixture in Lydd, Kent, with the name Lyddite. Japan followed with an alternative stabilisation approach known as Shimose powder which, instead of attempting to stabilise the material itself, removed its contact with metal by coating the inside of the shells with layer(s) of resin and wax.

By 1894 Russia was manufacturing artillery shells filled with picric acid. However, shells filled with picric acid become unstable if the compound reacts with the metal shell or fuze casings to form metal picrates which are more sensitive than the parent phenol. The sensitivity of picric acid was demonstrated by the Halifax Explosion.

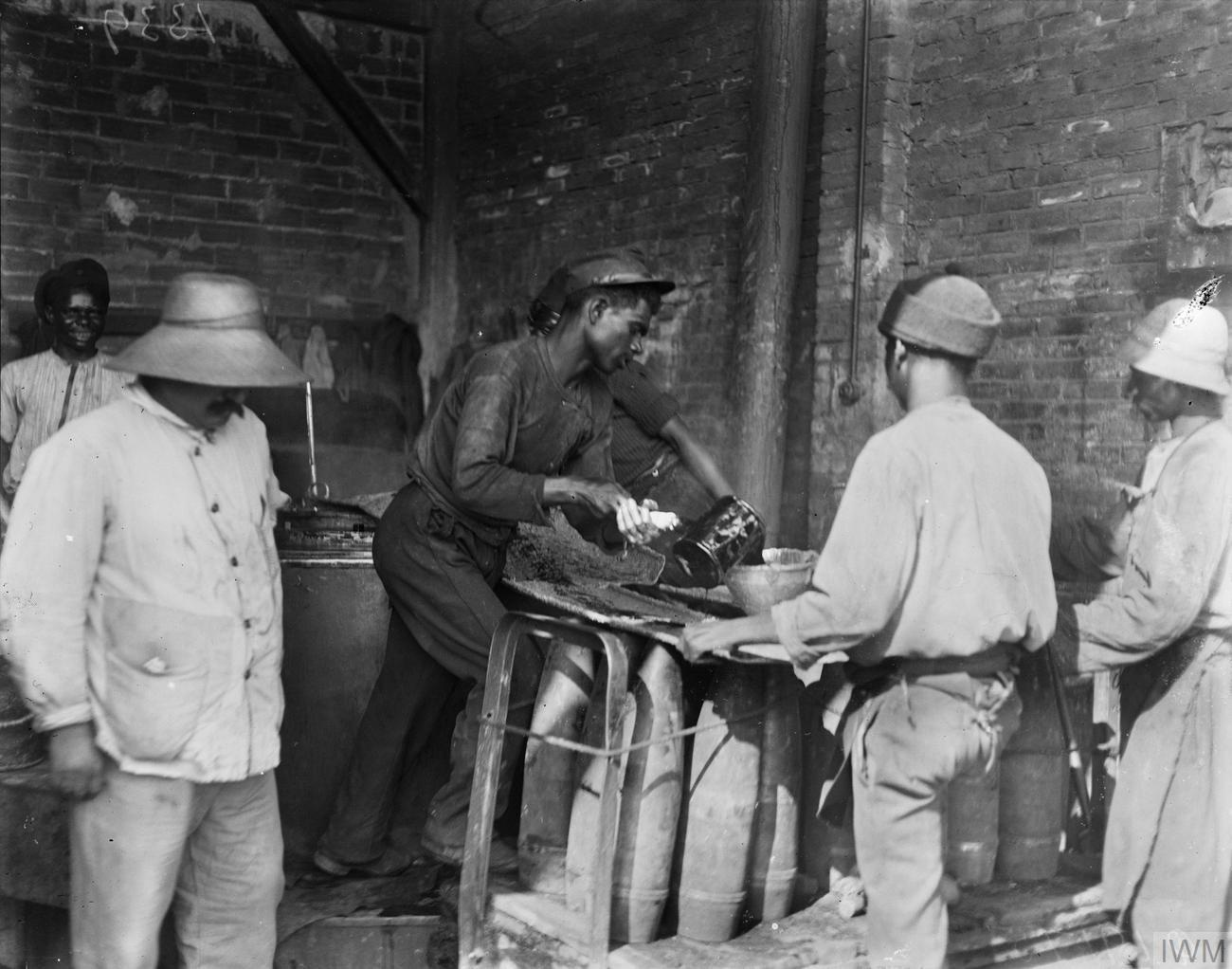
Workers filling shells with liquid melinite at a French munitions factory during WWI

Picric acid was used in the Battle of Omdurman, the Second Boer War, the Russo-Japanese War, and World War I.

Germany began filling artillery shells with trinitrotoluene (TNT) in 1902. Toluene was less readily available than phenol, and TNT is slightly less powerful than picric acid, but the improved safety of munitions manufacturing and storage caused the replacement of picric acid by TNT for most military purposes between the World Wars.

Efforts to control the availability of phenol, the precursor to picric acid, emphasise its importance in World War I. Germans are reported to have bought US supplies of phenol and converted it to acetylsalicylic acid (aspirin) to keep it from the Allies. At the time, phenol was obtained from coal as a co-product of coke ovens and the manufacture of gas for gas lighting. Laclede Gas reports being asked to expand production of phenol (and toluene) to assist the war effort. Both Monsanto and Dow Chemical began manufacturing synthetic phenol in 1915, with Dow being the main producer. Dow describes picric acid as "the main battlefield explosive used by the French. Large amounts [of phenol] also went to Japan, where it was made into picric acid sold to the Russians."

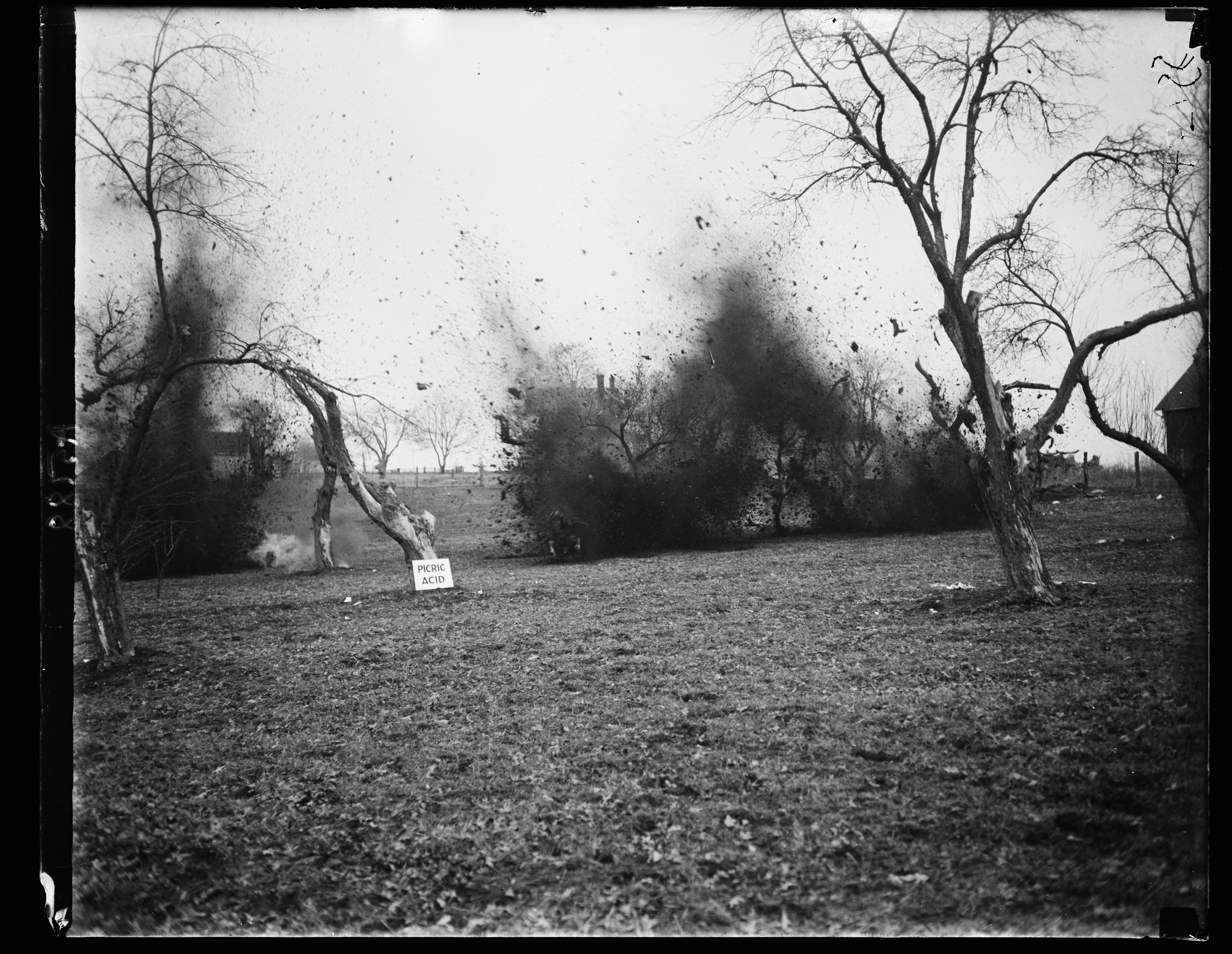
Photograph showing the use of picric acid on a farm to remove stumps and rocks.

== Synthesis ==
The following simple synthesis of picric acid from phenol is unviable:

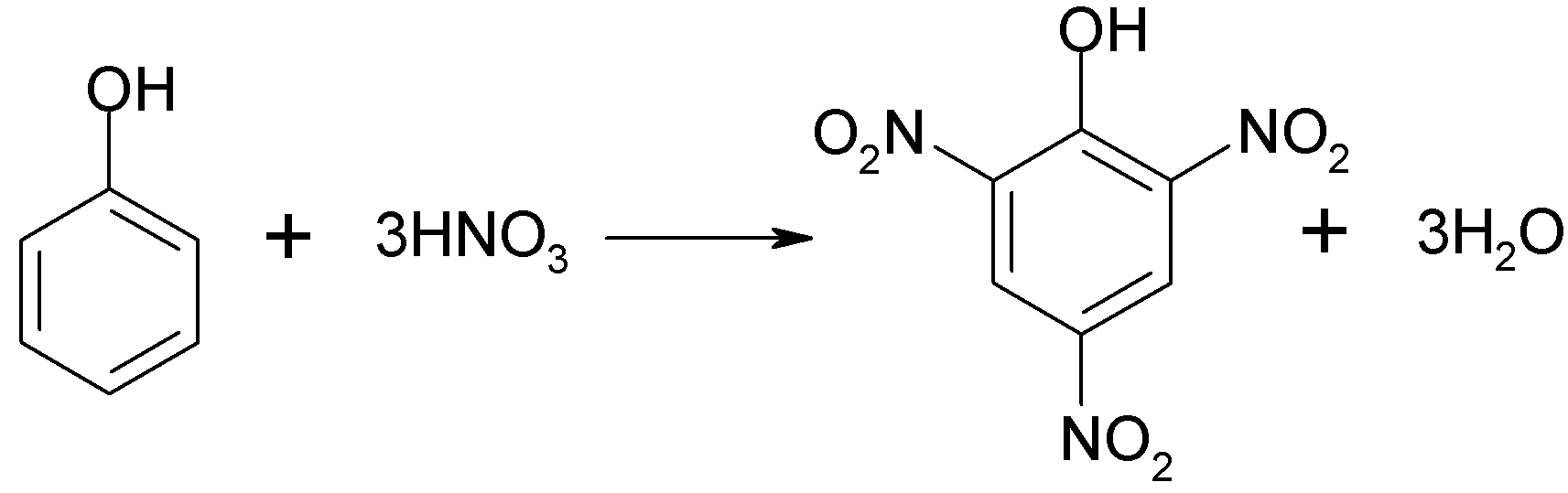

The aromatic ring of phenol is activated towards electrophilic substitution reactions, and attempted nitration of phenol, even with dilute nitric acid, results in the formation of high molecular weight tars.

In order to minimise these side reactions, anhydrous phenol is sulfonated with fuming sulfuric acid, and the resulting sulfonic acid is then nitrated with concentrated nitric acid. During this reaction, nitro groups are introduced, and the sulfonic acid group is displaced. The reaction is highly exothermic, and careful temperature control is required. Synthesis routes that nitrate aspirin or salicylic acid can also be used to mitigate tar formation. Carbon dioxide is lost from the former via decarboxylation, while both acetic acid and carbon dioxide are lost from the latter. Another method of picric acid synthesis is direct nitration of 2,4-dinitrophenol with nitric acid.

== Uses ==
By far the greatest use of picric acid has been in ammunition and explosives.

=== Derivatives ===
Ammonium picrate (Explosive D, also known as Dunnite), is the ammonium salt of picric acid. It is notably less sensitive to impact than either picric acid or TNT (16–17 in (41–43 cm) initiation drop height using the Picatinny Arsenal apparatus, vs. 12–14 in (30–36 cm) for TNT and 13 in (33 cm) for PA), which allowed its use in armour piercing ammunition. Ammonium picrate was used by the United States army beginning in 1901 and the navy in 1907.

Picramide, formed by aminating picric acid (typically beginning with Dunnite), can be further aminated to produce the very stable explosive TATB. It has found some use in organic chemistry for the preparation of crystalline salts of organic bases (picrates) for the purpose of identification and characterisation.

=== Optical metallography ===
In metallurgy, a 4% picric acid in ethanol etch, termed "picral", has been commonly used in optical metallography to reveal prior austenite grain boundaries in ferritic steels. The hazards associated with picric acid have meant it has largely been replaced with other chemical etchants. However, it is still used to etch magnesium alloys, such as AZ31.

=== Histology ===
Bouin solution is a common picric-acid–containing fixative solution used for histology specimens. It improves the staining of acid dyes, but it can also result in hydrolysis of any DNA in the sample.

Picric acid is used in the preparation of Picrosirius red, a histological stain for collagen.

=== Blood tests ===
Clinical chemistry laboratory testing utilises picric acid for the Jaffe reaction to test for creatinine. It forms a coloured complex that can be measured using spectroscopy.

Picric acid forms red isopurpurate with hydrogen cyanide (HCN). By photometric measurement of the resulting dye, picric acid can be used to quantify hydrogen cyanide.

During the early 20th century, picric acid was used to measure blood glucose levels. When glucose, picric acid and sodium carbonate are combined and heated, a characteristic red colour forms. With a calibrating glucose solution, the red colour can be used to measure the glucose levels added. This is known as the Lewis and Benedict method of measuring glucose.

=== Skin dye ===
Much less commonly, wet picric acid has been used as a skin dye, or temporary branding agent. It reacts with proteins in the skin to give a dark brown colour that may last as long as a month.

=== Antiseptic ===
During the early 20th century, picric acid was stocked in pharmacies as an antiseptic and as a treatment for burns, malaria, herpes, and smallpox. Picric-acid–soaked gauze was commonly stocked in first aid kits from that period as a burn treatment. It was notably used for the treatment of burns suffered by victims of the Hindenburg disaster in 1937.

Picric acid was used as a treatment for trench foot suffered by soldiers on the Western Front during World War I.

Picric acid has been used for many years by fly tyers to dye mole skins and feathers a dark olive green for use as fishing lures. Its popularity has been tempered by its toxic nature.

== Safety ==
Modern safety precautions recommend storing picric acid wet, to minimise the danger of explosion. Glass or plastic bottles are required, as picric acid forms metal picrate salts that can be more sensitive and hazardous than the acid, and which are powerful enough to initiate detonation in the acid. The build up of picrates on exposed metal surfaces can constitute an explosion hazard.

Picric acid gauze, if found in antique first aid kits, presents a safety hazard because picric acid of that vintage (60–90 years old) becomes crystallised and unstable, or it may form metal picrates from long storage in a metal first aid case.

Bomb disposal units are often called to dispose of picric acid if it has dried out.

Munitions containing picric acid may be found in sunken warships. The accumulation of metal picrates over time renders them shock-sensitive and extremely hazardous. It is recommended that shipwrecks that contain such munitions not be disturbed. The hazard may subside when the shells become corroded enough to admit seawater as these materials are water-soluble. There are fluorescent probes to detect picric acid in very minute quantities.

== See also ==
- RE factor
- Shellite (explosive), an explosive containing picric acid, formerly used in naval shells.
- Styphnic acid
- Picramide
- Table of explosive detonation velocities
- Verhoeff's stain
