= Victoria blue =

Victoria blue may refer to:

- Triarylmethane dye § Victoria blue dyes
  - Victoria blue BO, a dye
  - Victoria blue R, a dye
- Lepidochrysops victoriae, an African butterfly
