= 4-Iodo-N,N-dimethylaniline =

Names
- Preferred IUPAC name 4-Iodo-N,N-dimethylaniline
- Other names N,N-Dimethyl-4-iodoaniline

Identifiers
CAS Number	698-70-4
3D model (JSmol)	Interactive image
ChemSpider	120299
PubChem CID	136531
UNII	K6X9S6FT68
CompTox Dashboard (EPA)	DTXSID00220100
- InChI: InChI=1S/C8H10IN/c1-10(2)8-5-3-7(9)4-6-8/h3-6H,1-2H3 Key: QYOPPZJZMFMBDN-UHFFFAOYSA-N
- SMILES: Ic1ccc(N(C)C)cc1

Properties
Chemical formula	C_{8}H_{10}IN
Molar mass	247.079 g·mol^{−1}
Appearance	dark blue to purple solid
Density	1.652 g/cm^{3}
Boiling point	263.7 °C (506.7 °F; 536.8 K)
Solubility in water	34.64 mg/L
Vapor pressure	2 mmHg

Hazards
- GHS labelling
Pictograms	(GHS08: Health hazard) (GHS09: Environmental hazard)
NFPA 704 (fire diamond)	3 2 0
- Except where otherwise noted, data are given for materials in their standard state (at 25 °C [77 °F], 100 kPa). Infobox references

4-Iodo-N,N-dimethylaniline, usually called 4-iododimethylaniline, is an organic compound with the formula IC_{6}H_{4}N(CH_{3})_{2}. It is a dark blue to purple solid. The compound is used to attach the dimethylanilinyl group to other substrates.

== Synthesis ==
4-Iodo-dimethylaniline is prepared by iodination of dimethylaniline.

C_{6}H_{5}NMe_{2} + I_{2} → I:C_{6}H_{4}NMe_{2} + HI

The iodination is so efficient that it has been recommended for quantifying the presence of iodine.
