= Michler's ketone =

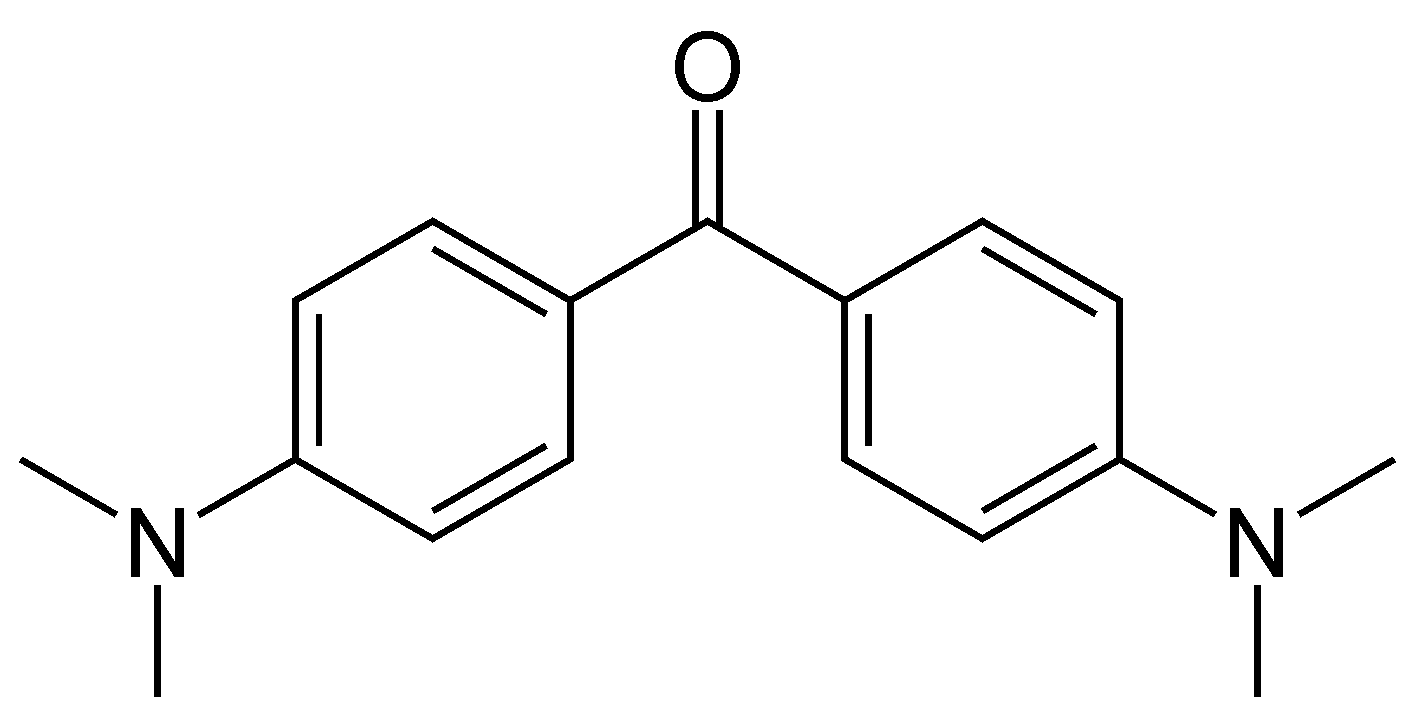

Names
- Preferred IUPAC name Bis[4-(dimethylamino)phenyl]methanone
- Other names 4,4'-Bis(N,N-dimethylamino)benzophenone; 4,4'-Bis(dimethylamino)benzophenone; Bis(p-(N,N-dimethylamino)phenyl)ketone; Michler ketone Michler's Ketone

Identifiers
CAS Number	90-94-8
3D model (JSmol)	Interactive image
ChemSpider	6764
ECHA InfoCard	100.001.843
EC Number	202-027-5
KEGG	C19266
PubChem CID	7031
UNII	3Z2SN6B347
CompTox Dashboard (EPA)	DTXSID2020894
- InChI: InChI=1S/C17H20N2O/c1-18(2)15-9-5-13(6-10-15)17(20)14-7-11-16(12-8-14)19(3)4/h5-12H,1-4H3 Key: VVBLNCFGVYUYGU-UHFFFAOYSA-N; InChI=1/C17H20N2O/c1-18(2)15-9-5-13(6-10-15)17(20)14-7-11-16(12-8-14)19(3)4/h5-12H,1-4H3 Key: VVBLNCFGVYUYGU-UHFFFAOYAE
- SMILES: CN(C)C1=CC=C(C=C1)C(=O)C2=CC=C(C=C2)N(C)C

Properties
Chemical formula	C_{17}H_{20}N_{2}O
Molar mass	268.360 g·mol^{−1}
Appearance	Colorless solid
Melting point	173 °C (343 °F; 446 K)

Hazards
- GHS labelling
Pictograms	(GHS05: Corrosive) (GHS08: Health hazard)
Signal word	Warning
Hazard statements	H318, H341, H350
Precautionary statements	P201, P280, P305+P351+P338+P310, P308+P313
Safety data sheet (SDS)	External MSDS

Related compounds
Related compounds	Benzophenone
- Except where otherwise noted, data are given for materials in their standard state (at 25 °C [77 °F], 100 kPa). verify (what is ?) Infobox references

Michler's ketone is an organic compound with the formula of [(CH_{3})_{2}NC_{6}H_{4}]_{2}CO. This electron-rich derivative of benzophenone is an intermediate in the production of dyes and pigments, for example Methyl violet. It is also used as a photosensitizer. It is named after the German chemist Wilhelm Michler. Michler's ketone is positively solvatochromic.

== Synthesis ==
The ketone is prepared today as it was originally by Michler using the Friedel-Crafts acylation of dimethylaniline (C_{6}H_{5}NMe_{2}) using phosgene (COCl_{2}) or equivalent reagents such as triphosgene

COCl_{2} + 2 C_{6}H_{5}NMe_{2} → (Me_{2}NC_{6}H_{4})_{2}CO + 2 HCl → salt

The related tetraethyl compound (Et_{2}NC_{6}H_{4})_{2}CO, also a precursor to dyes, is prepared similarly.

== Uses ==
Michler's ketone is an intermediate in the synthesis of dyes and pigments for paper, textiles, and leather. Condensation with various aniline derivatives gives several of the dyes called methyl violet, such as crystal violet.

Condensation of Michler's ketone with N-phenyl-1-naphthylamine gives the dye Victoria Blue B (CAS#2580-56-5, CI Basic Blue 26), which is used for coloring paper and producing pastes and inks for ballpoint pens.

Michler's ketone is commonly used as an additive in dyes and pigments as a sensitizer for photoreactions because of its absorption properties. Michler's ketone is an effective sensitizer provided energy transfer is exothermic and the concentration of the acceptor is sufficiently high to quench the photoreaction of Michler's ketone with itself. Specifically Michler's ketone absorbs intensely at 366 nm and effectively sensitizes photochemical reactions such as the dimerization of butadiene to give 1,2-divinylcyclobutane.

== Related compounds ==
p-Dimethylaminobenzophenone is related to Michler's ketone, but with only one amine. Auramine O, a dye, is a salt of the iminium cation [(CH_{3})_{2}NC_{6}H_{4}]_{2}CNH_{2}^{+}. Michler's thione, [(CH_{3})_{2}NC_{6}H_{4}]_{2}CS, is prepared by treatment of Michler's ketone with hydrogen sulfide in the presence of acid or sulfideing auramine O. Hydride reduction of Michler's ketone gives 4,4'-bis(dimethylamino)benzhydrol.
