= Aurintricarboxylic acid =

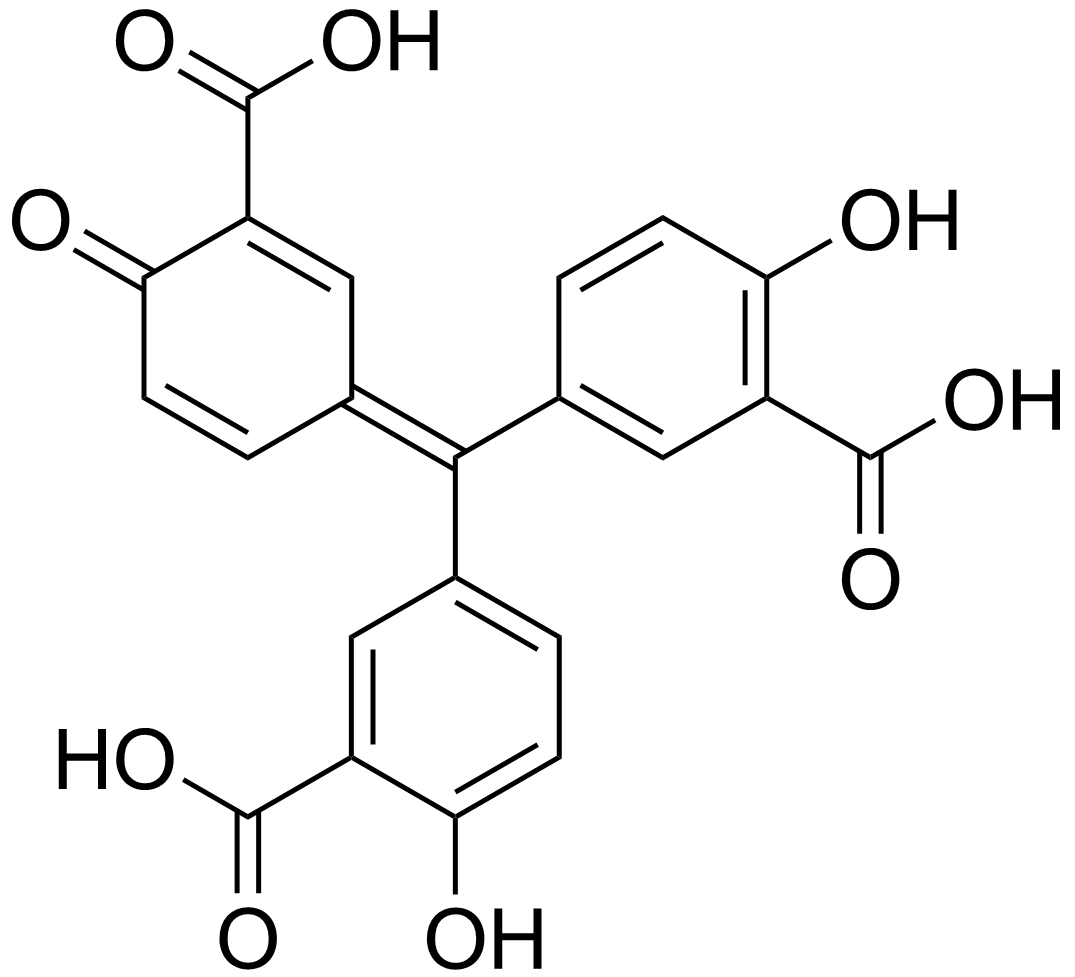

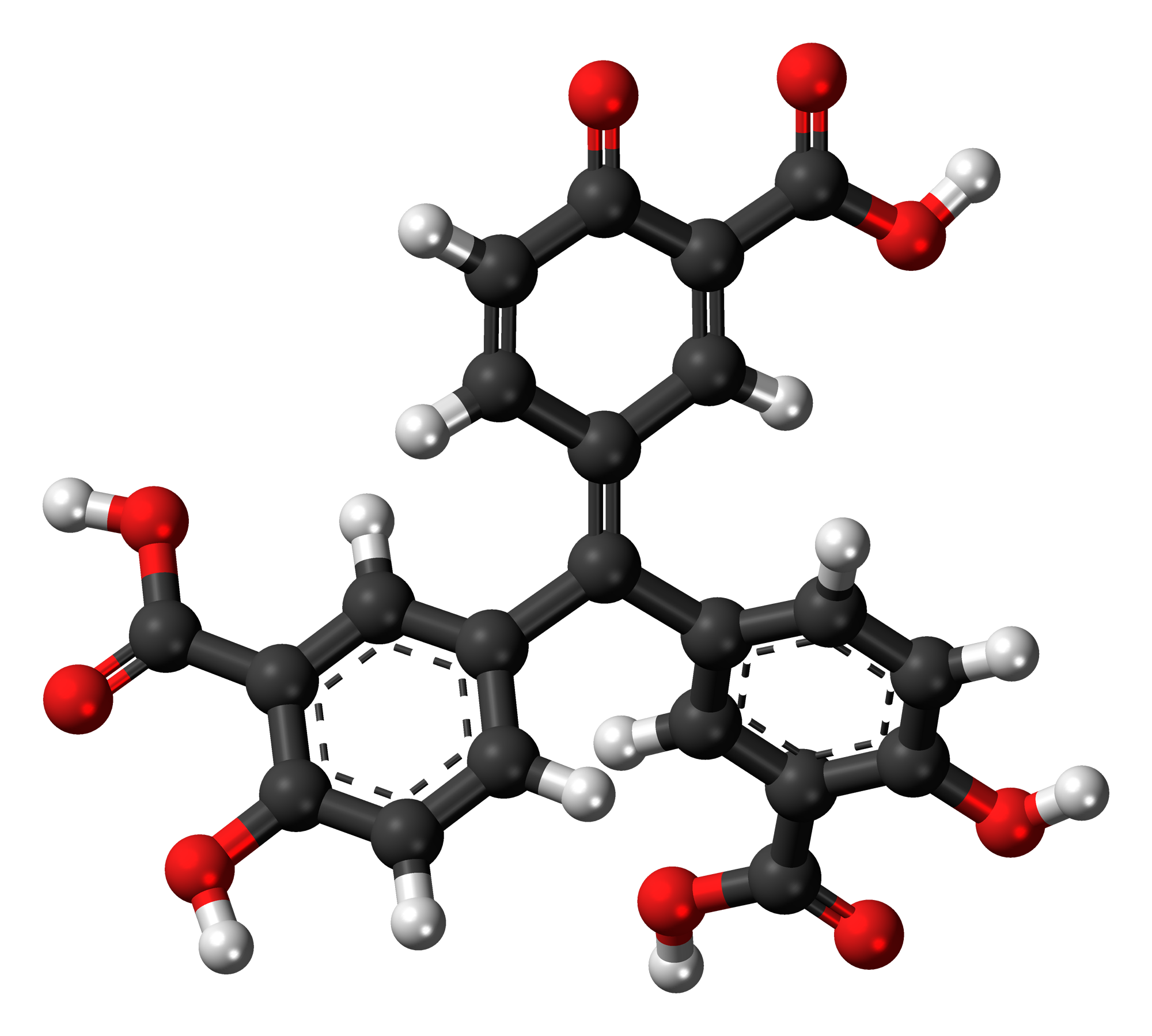

Names
- Preferred IUPAC name 3,3′-[(3-Carboxy-4-oxocyclohexa-2,5-dien-1-ylidene)methylene]bis(6-hydroxybenzoic acid)
- Other names 5,5′-[(3-Carboxy-4-oxocyclohexa-2,5-dien-1-ylidene)methylene]bis(2-hydroxybenzoic acid); Aluminon free acid

Identifiers
CAS Number	4431-00-9
3D model (JSmol)	Interactive image; Interactive image
Abbreviations	ATA
ChEBI	CHEBI:87397
ChEMBL	ChEMBL275938
ChemSpider	2172; 323088 (tautomeric form)
ECHA InfoCard	100.022.390
PubChem CID	2259
UNII	NP9O8E29QW
CompTox Dashboard (EPA)	DTXSID9063453
- InChI: InChI=1S/C22H14O9/c23-16-4-1-10(7-13(16)20(26)27)19(11-2-5-17(24)14(8-11)21(28)29)12-3-6-18(25)15(9-12)22(30)31/h1-9,23-24H,(H,26,27)(H,28,29)(H,30,31) Key: GIXWDMTZECRIJT-UHFFFAOYSA-N; InChI=1/C22H14O9/c23-16-4-1-10(7-13(16)20(26)27)19(11-2-5-17(24)14(8-11)21(28)29)12-3-6-18(25)15(9-12)22(30)31/h1-9,23-24H,(H,26,27)(H,28,29)(H,30,31) Key: GIXWDMTZECRIJT-UHFFFAOYAI
- SMILES: C1=CC(=C(C=C1C(=C2C=CC(=O)C(=C2)C(=O)O)C3=CC(=C(C=C3)O)C(=O)O)C(=O)O)O; O=C(O)\C1=C\C(\C=C/C1=O)=C(/c2ccc(O)c(C(=O)O)c2)c3ccc(O)c(C(=O)O)c3

Properties
Chemical formula	C_{22}H_{14}O_{9}
Molar mass	422.345 g·mol^{−1}
Appearance	Dark red to brown powder
Melting point	300 °C (572 °F; 573 K)
- Except where otherwise noted, data are given for materials in their standard state (at 25 °C [77 °F], 100 kPa). verify (what is ?) Infobox references

Aurintricarboxylic acid (ATA) is a chemical compound (triarylmethane dye) that readily polymerizes in aqueous solution, forming a stable free radical that inhibits protein-nucleic acid interactions. It is a potent inhibitor of ribonuclease and topoisomerase II by preventing the binding of the nucleic acid to the enzyme. It stimulates tyrosine phosphorylation processes including the Jak2/STAT5 pathway in NB2 lymphoma cells, ErbB4 in neuroblastoma cells, and MAP kinases, Shc proteins, phosphatidylinositide 3-kinase and phospholipase Cγ in PC12 cells. It also inhibits apoptosis. It prevents down-regulation of Ca^{2+}-impermeable GluR2 receptors and inhibits calpain, a Ca^{2+}-activated protease that is activated during apoptosis.

It is used to inhibit protein biosynthesis in its initial stages. Nominally, it is used in biological experiments as a protein inhibitor, and as an ammonium salt (known as aluminon) it is used as a reagent to estimate the aluminium in water, biological tissue, and foods.

It was found that ATA is a strong inhibitor of topoisomerases and other nucleases. It might be useful for increasing efficiency of RNA isolation.

It has been discovered that using aurintricarboxylic acid against influenza-A post-infection has a strong protective effect by inhibiting the virus' ability to reproduce. In cultured canine kidney cells, it was found to reduce viral reproduction and infection when applied post-infection, but not when used as a 'vaccine'. It has also been shown to block the binding of the HIV coat molecule gp120 to the CD4 co-receptor on T cells through which it invades.

Aurintricarboxylic acid and its ammonium salt shows antiviral activity in vitro against coronaviruses such as SARS, MERS and SARS-CoV-2, and while it is unlikely to have suitable properties to be developed as a medicine in its own right, it has proved useful in scientific research into novel antiviral drugs to combat these diseases.

== Preparation ==
Aurintricarboxylic acid can be prepared by the condensation of formaldehyde with salicylic acid in the presence of nitrite-containing sulfuric acid.
