= Corey–Itsuno reduction =

Chemical reaction

Named after	Elias James Corey; Shinichi Itsuno
Reaction type	Organic redox reaction

Identifiers
Organic Chemistry Portal	corey-bakshi-shibata-reduction

The Corey–Itsuno reduction, also known as the Corey–Bakshi–Shibata (CBS) reduction, is a chemical reaction in which a prochiral ketone is enantioselectively reduced to produce the corresponding chiral, non-racemic alcohol. The oxazaborolidine reagent which mediates the enantioselective reduction of ketones was previously developed by the laboratory of Shinichi Itsuno and thus this transformation may more properly be called the Itsuno-Corey oxazaborolidine reduction.

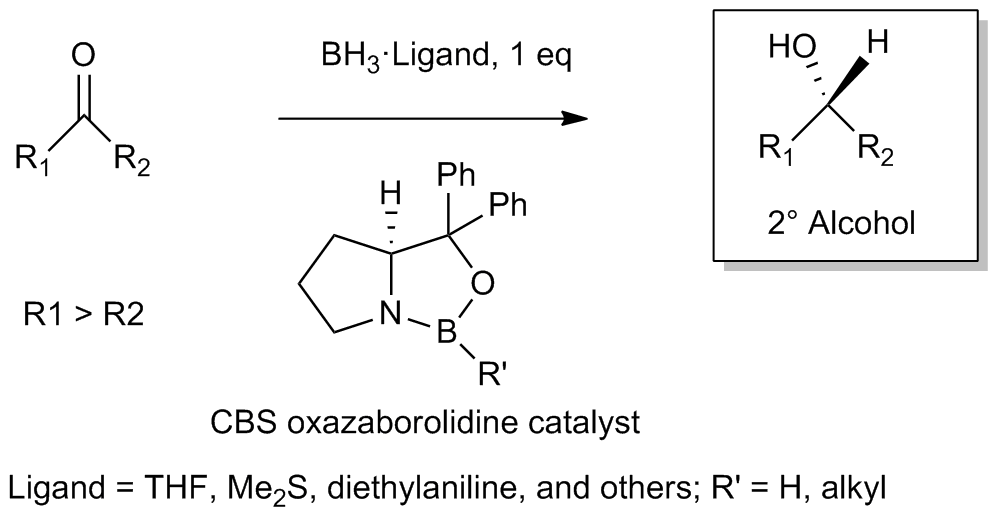
The CBS reduction

== History ==
In 1981, Itsuno and coworkers first reported the use of chiral alkoxy-amine-borane complexes in reducing achiral ketones to chiral alcohols enantioselectively and in high yield.

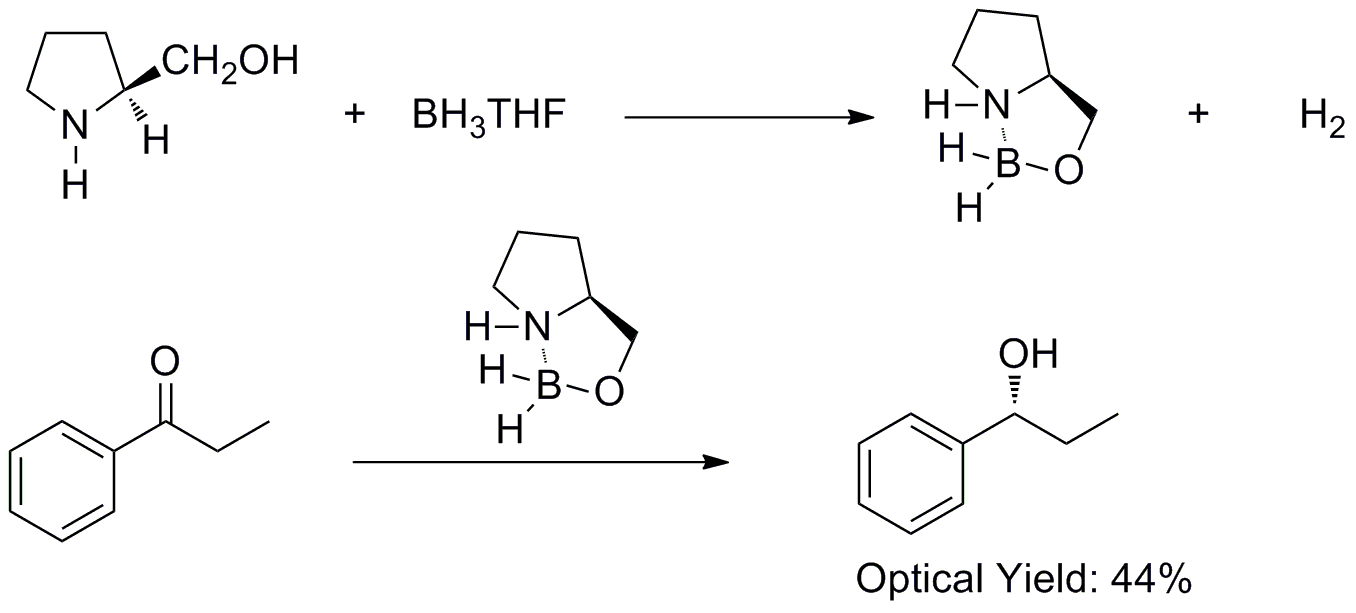
Corey–Bakshi–Shibata reduction (CBS reduction)-1

Several years later in 1987, E. J. Corey and coworkers developed the reaction between chiral amino alcohols and borane (BH_{3}), generating oxazaborolidine products which were shown to rapidly catalyze the enantioselective reduction of achiral ketones in the presence of BH_{3}•THF.

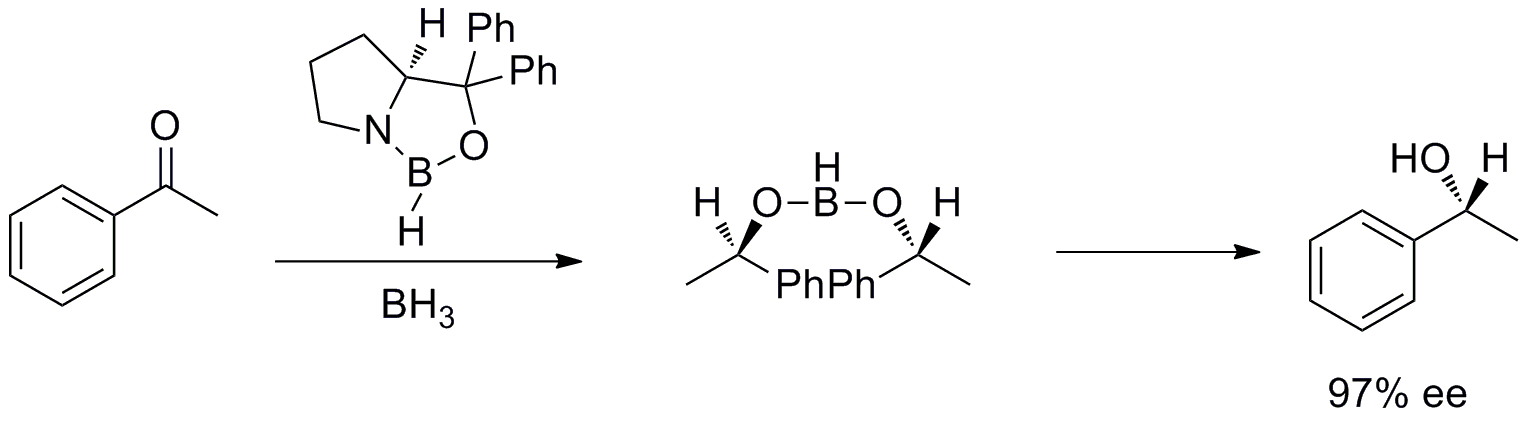
Corey-Bakshi-Shibata Reduction (CBS Reduction)-2

The CBS reduction has since been utilized by organic chemists as a reliable method for the asymmetric reduction of achiral ketones. Notably, it has found prominent use not only in a number of natural product syntheses, but has been utilized on large scale in industry (See Scope Below). Several reviews have been published.

== Mechanism ==
Corey and coworkers originally proposed the following reaction mechanism to explain the selectivity obtained in the catalytic reduction.

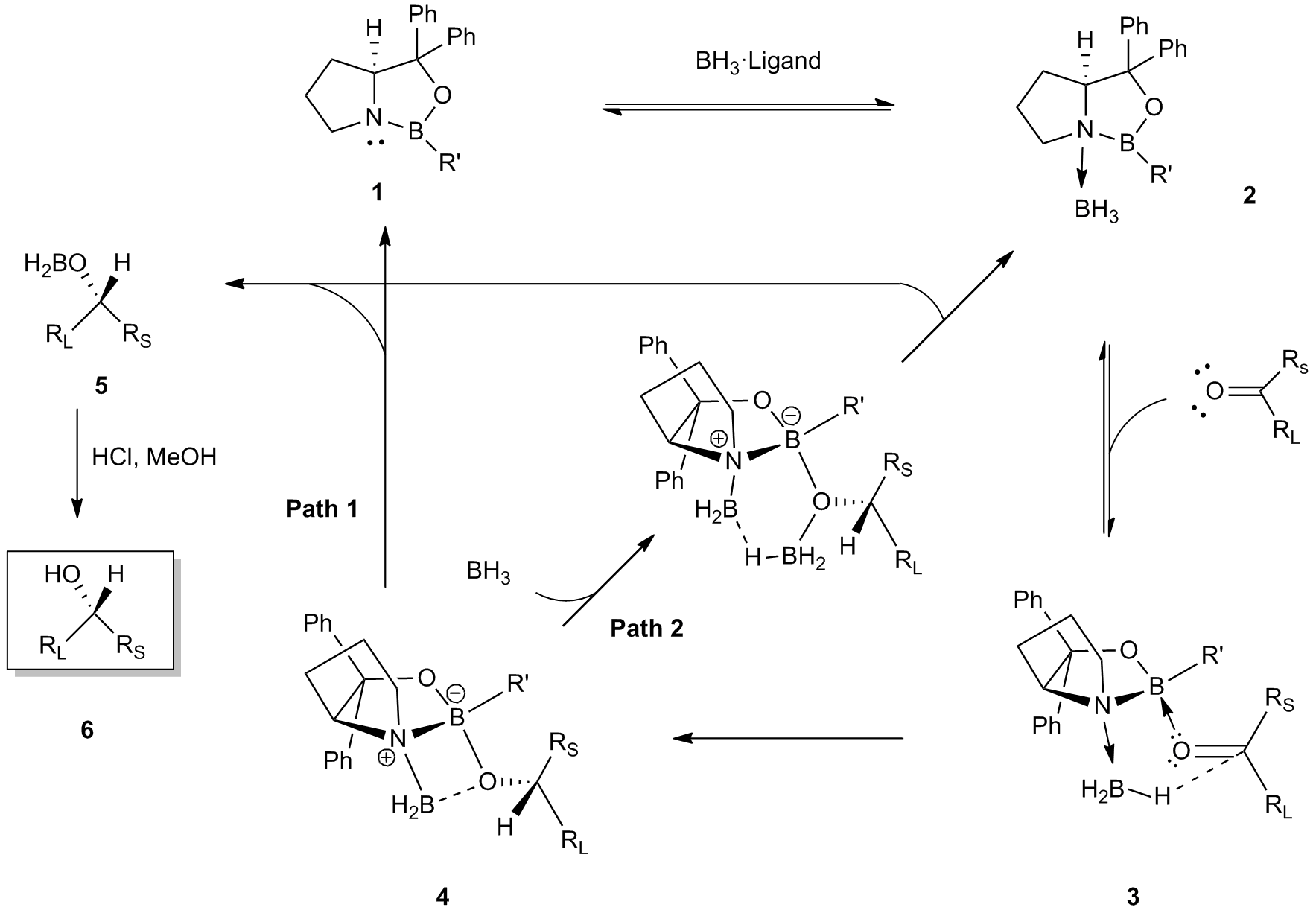
Mechanism of CBS reduction

The first step of the mechanism involves the coordination of BH_{3} to the nitrogen atom of the oxazaborolidine CBS catalyst 1. This coordination serves to activate the BH_{3} as a hydride donor and to enhance the Lewis acidity of the catalyst's endocyclic boron. X-ray crystal structures and ^{11}B NMR spectroscopic analyses of the coordinated catalyst-borane complex 2 have provided support for this initial step. Subsequently, the endocyclic boron of the catalyst coordinates to the ketone at the sterically more accessible electron lone pair (i.e. the lone pair closer to the smaller substituent, Rs). This preferential binding in 3 acts to minimize 1,3-allylic strain between the ketone (the large R_{L} substituent directed away) and the R’ group of the catalyst, and aligns the carbonyl and the coordinated borane for a favorable, face-selective hydride transfer through a six-membered transition state 4. Hydride transfer yields the chiral alkoxyborane 5, which upon acidic workup yields the chiral alcohol 6. The last step to regenerate the catalyst may take place by two different pathways (Path 1 or 2).

The predominant driving force for this face-selective, intramolecular hydride transfer is the simultaneous activation of the borane reagent by coordination to the Lewis basic nitrogen and the enhancement of the Lewis acidity of the endocyclic boron atom for coordination to the ketone.

== Scope and limitations ==
=== Stereo and chemoselectivity ===
The CBS reduction has proven to be an effective and powerful method to reduce a wide range of different types of ketones in both a stereoselective and chemoselective manner. Substrates include a large variety of aryl-aliphatic, di-aliphatic, di-aryl, α,β unsaturated enone and ynone systems, as well as ketones containing heteroatoms. Combinations of different derivatives of the CBS catalyst and borane reducing agents have been employed to optimize enantioselectivity.

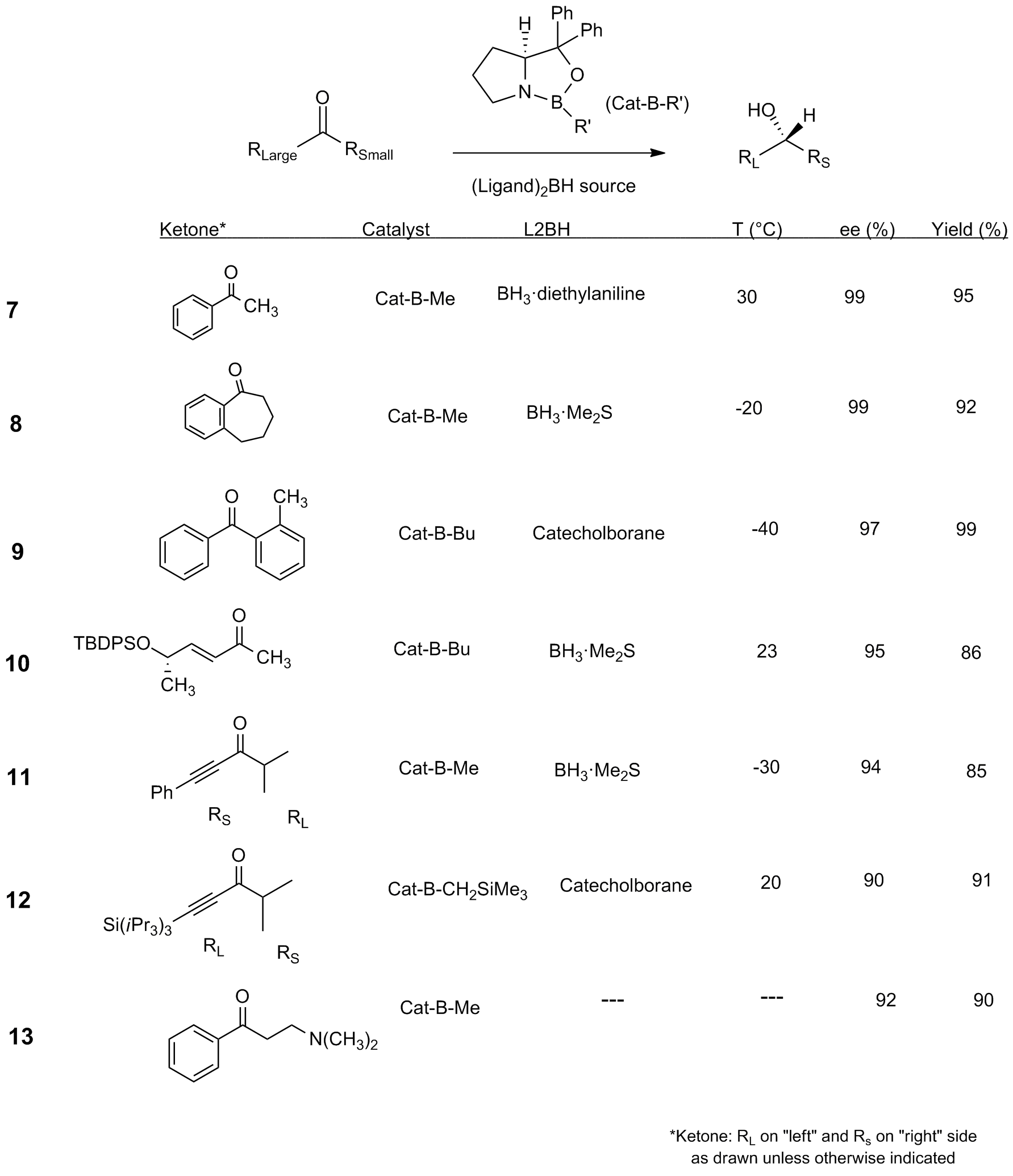
Scope of CBS reduction

Several interesting cases are worth noting in this selection of substrates. First, in the case of the diaryl system 9, relatively high stereoselectively is achieved despite the isosteric nature of the ketone substituents, suggesting that electronics in addition to sterics may play a role in the stereoselectivity of the CBS reduction. Differences in the substitution of the alkyne moieties in ynones 11 and 12 result in a change of selectivity for the alkyne to function as the more sterically bulky substituent rather than the smaller one. For the α,β unsaturated systems 10-12, efficient reduction of the ketone occurs despite the possible side reaction of hydroboration of the C-C unsaturated bond. The CBS reduction has also been shown to tolerate the presence of heteroatoms as in ketone 13, which is capable of coordinating to the borane.

=== Experimental considerations and limitations ===
The presence of water in the reaction mixture has been shown to have a significant effect on enantiomeric excesses, and thus the CBS reduction must be conducted under anhydrous conditions. Temperature also plays a critical role in the observed stereoselectivity. In general, at lower temperatures enantiomeric excesses (ee's) are obtained. However, when the temperature is increased, the ee values reach a maximum value that is dependent on the catalyst structure and borane reducing agent used. The use of the borane reagent catecholborane, which has been shown to participate in CBS reductions carried out at temperatures as low as -126 °C with marked enantioselectivity, offers a potential solution to improving the diminished ee values obtained at lower temperatures.

Enantioselectivity issues associated with the use of BH_{3} as the reducing agent for the CBS reduction have been reported. Commercially available solutions of BH_{3}•THF evaluated by Nettles et al. were shown to contain trace amounts of borohydride species, which participate in nonselective reductions that led to the diminished enantioselectivity. Though the borohydride catalyzed reduction pathway is much slower than the CBS catalyzed reduction, the side reaction still presents a potential challenge to optimize stereoselectivity.

In 2012, Mahale et al. developed a safe and inexpensive procedure for asymmetric reduction of ketones using in situ prepared N,N-diethylaniline-borane and oxazaborolidine catalyst from sodium borohydride, N,N-diethylaniline hydrochloride and (S)-α,α-diphenylprolinol

== Variations ==
Although CBS catalyst 1 developed by Corey has become commonly employed in the CBS reduction reaction, other derivatives of the catalyst have been developed and utilized successfully. The R’ group of the CBS catalyst plays an important role in the enantioselectivity of the reduction, and as illustrated in above in the Scope section, several variations of the CBS R’ group have been employed to optimize selectivity.

== Applications ==
Over the past couple of decades, the CBS reduction has gained significant synthetic utility in the synthesis of a significant number of natural products, including lactones, terpenoids, alkaloids, steroids, and biotins. The enantioselective reduction has also been employed on large scale in industry. Jones et al. utilized the CBS reduction in the total synthesis of MK-0417, a water-soluble carbonic anhydrase inhibitor which has been used therapeutically to reduce intraocular pressure. Asymmetric reduction of a key bicyclic sulfone intermediate was accomplished with the CBS oxazaborolidine catalyst containing Me as the R’ group.

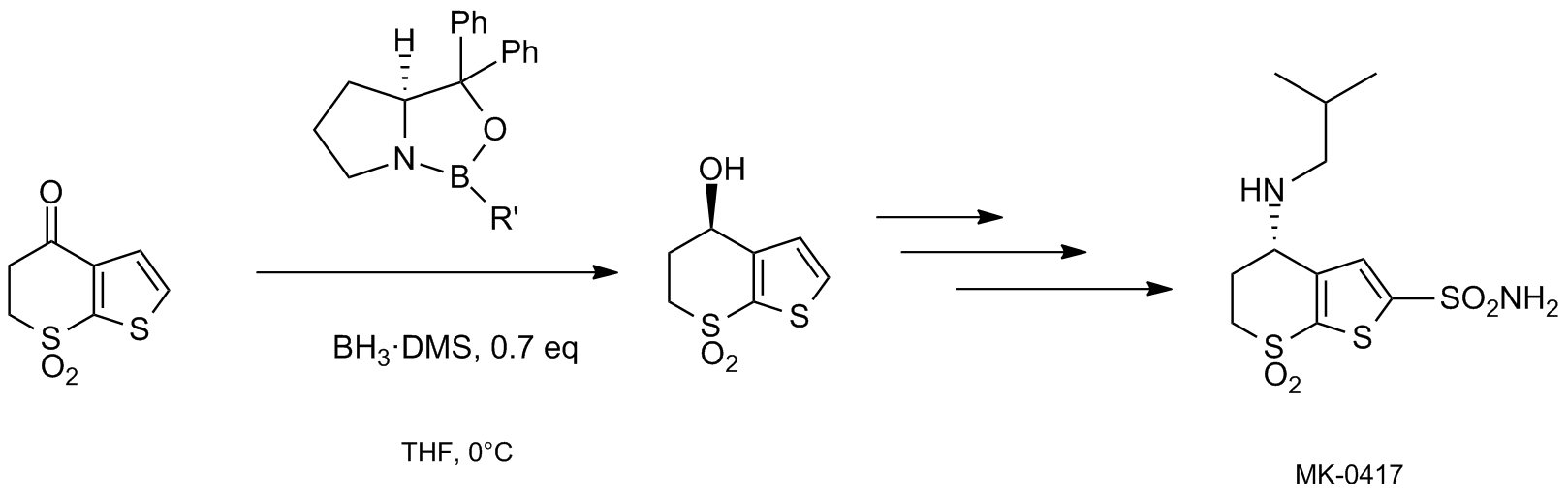
CBS reduction of sulfone in MK-0417 synthesis

Asymmetric reduction of a 1,1,1-trichloro-2-keto compound is the first stage of the Corey–Link reaction for synthesis of amino acids and related structures with a choice of either natural or un-natural stereochemistry and various side-chains.

Asymmetric reduction of 7-(Benzyloxy)hept-1-en-3-one leads to (S)-7-(Benzyloxy)hept-1-en-3-ol, a chiral alcohol that leads directly to synthesis of kanamienamides, that are currently researched as enamide containing enol ethers that show potent inhibition of cancer cells. The selective formation of the chiral product is achieved by (R)-CBS catalyst with 89% yield and with 91% enantiomeric excess.

== See also ==
- Midland Alpine borane reduction
- Noyori asymmetric hydrogenation
