= Methyl violet 2B =

- Methyl violet 2B

Names
- IUPAC name 4,4′-[(4-Imino-2,5-cyclohexadien-1-yliden)methylen]bis(N,N-dimethylaniline)hydrochloride
- Other names: Tetraamethylparosanilinium chloride

Identifiers
CAS Number	8004-87-3
3D model (JSmol)	Interactive image
ChEBI	CHEBI:90108
ChemSpider	21164086
ECHA InfoCard	100.074.935
EC Number	610-776-8
PubChem CID	91997555
UNII	9691711H0F
- InChI: Key: WWKGVZASJYXZKN-UHFFFAOYSA-N
- SMILES: CN(C)C1=CC=C(C=C1)C(=C2C=CC(=N)C=C2)C3=CC=C(C=C3)N(C)C.Cl

Properties
Chemical formula	C_{23}H_{26}N_{3}Cl
Appearance	Green to dark-green powder
Melting point	decomposes
Solubility in water	Soluble in water, ethanol, insoluble in xylene
- Except where otherwise noted, data are given for materials in their standard state (at 25 °C [77 °F], 100 kPa). verify (what is ?) Infobox references

Methyl violet 2B (Tetramethylparosanilinium chloride, 4,4′-[(4-imino-2,5-cyclohexadien-1-ylidene)methylen]bis(N,N-dimethylaniline)hydrochloride) is a violet triarylmethane dye from the group of cationic dyes and an essential component of C.I. Basic Violet 1 (trivial name methyl violet). Methyl violets are mixtures of tetramethyl (2B), pentamethyl (6B) and hexamethyl (10B) pararosanilins.
