= C17H22N2O =

The molecular formula C_{17}H_{22}N_{2}O may refer to:

- 4,4'-Bis(dimethylamino)benzhydrol
- Doxylamine, a sedative antihistamine
- 5-MeO-DALT, or N,N-diallyl-5-methoxytryptamine
