= Wilhelm Michler =

German chemist (1846–1889)

- Born: 27 December 1846; Schmerbach (now Creglingen), Germany
- Died: 27 November 1889 (aged 42); Rio de Janeiro, Brazil
- Known for: Michler's ketone
- Scientific career
- Workplaces: ETH Zurich, Escola Politécnica Rio de Janeiro
- Doctoral advisor: Victor Meyer

Wilhelm Michler (27 December 1846 – 27 November 1889) was a German chemist. He studied under Hermann von Fehling and Victor Meyer in Stuttgart and followed Meyer to the ETH Zurich in 1871. Michler became professor at the ETH Zurich in 1878. He left Europe for a journey to study the natural products of South America in August 1881. He reached Brazil and conducted his research between 1882 and his death in 1889. He also became professor at the Escola Politécnica Rio de Janeiro.

He first synthesised bis(dimethylamino)benzophenone, a commercially and scientifically important compound, which is now known as Michler's ketone. In a continuation of his research on phosgene, he studied and published widely on N-substituted ureas.
