= Aluminon =

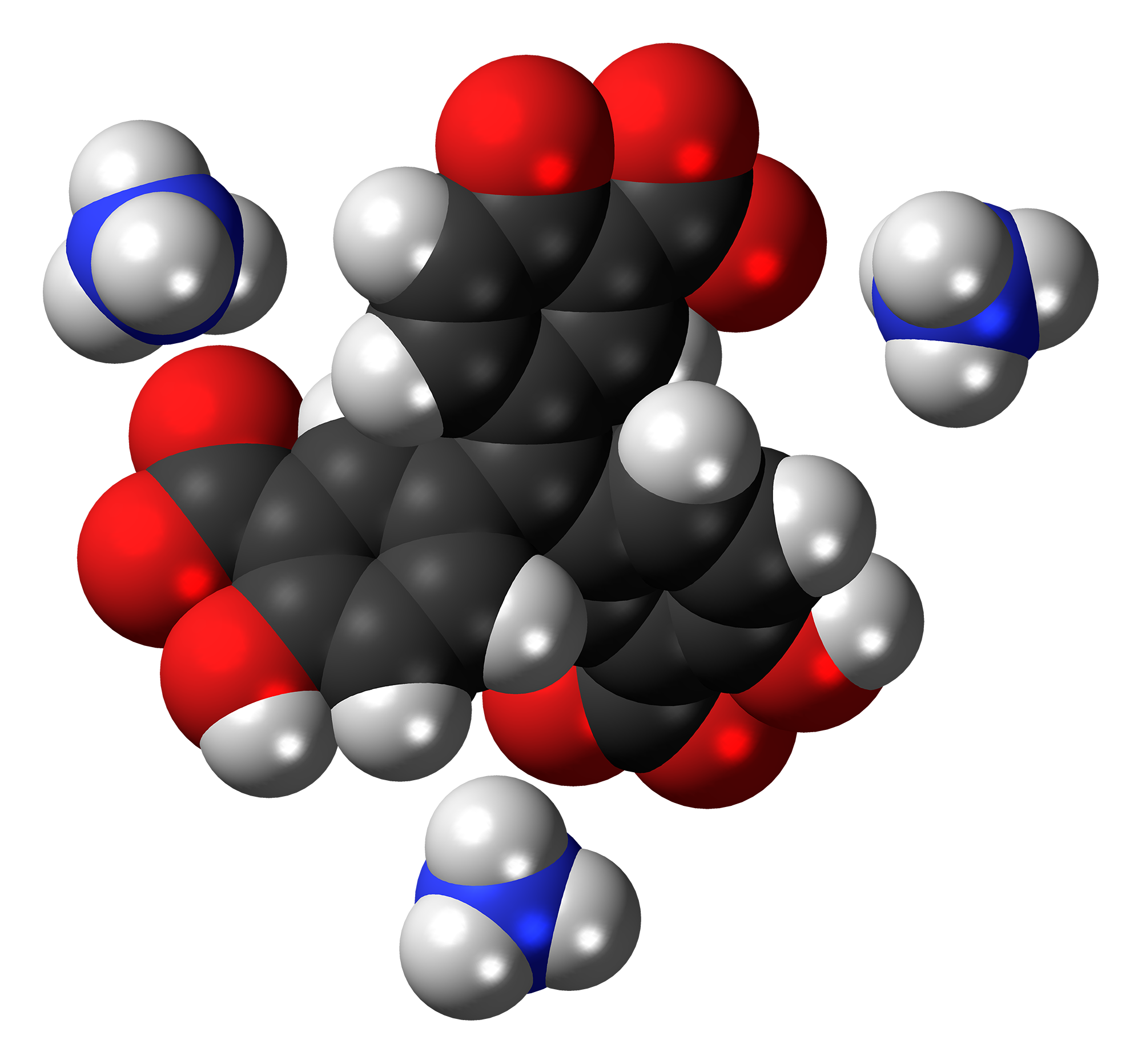

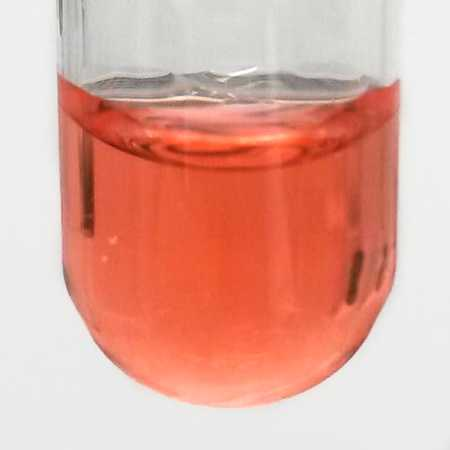

Names
- Other names ammonium aurin-tricarboxylate; 5-[(3-carboxy-4-hydroxyphenyl)(3-carboxy-4-oxo-2,5-cyclohexadien-ylidene)methyl]-2-hydroxybenzoic acid triammonium salt

Identifiers
CAS Number	569-58-4
3D model (JSmol)	Interactive image
ChemSpider	2016698
ECHA InfoCard	100.008.473
EC Number	209-319-1
PubChem CID	54729869
UNII	23J05NR06D
CompTox Dashboard (EPA)	DTXSID40932215 DTXSID20889354, DTXSID40932215
- InChI: InChI=1S/C22H14O9.3H3N/c23-16-4-1-10(7-13(16)20(26)27)19(11-2-5-17(24)14(8-11)21(28)29)12-3-6-18(25)15(9-12)22(30)31;;;/h1-9,23-24H,(H,26,27)(H,28,29)(H,30,31);3*1H3 Key: AIPNSHNRCQOTRI-UHFFFAOYSA-N; InChI=1/C22H14O9.3H3N/c23-16-4-1-10(7-13(16)20(26)27)19(11-2-5-17(24)14(8-11)21(28)29)12-3-6-18(25)15(9-12)22(30)31;;;/h1-9,23-24H,(H,26,27)(H,28,29)(H,30,31);3*1H3 Key: AIPNSHNRCQOTRI-UHFFFAOYAI
- SMILES: O=C([O-])\C1=C\C(\C=C/C1=O)=C(\c2ccc(O)c(C([O-])=O)c2)c3ccc(O)c(C([O-])=O)c3.[NH4+].[NH4+].[NH4+]

Properties
Chemical formula	C_{22}H_{23}N_{3}O_{9}
Molar mass	473.43 g/mol
Appearance	yellow-brown crystals, red in aqueous solution
Solubility in other solvents	freely soluble in H_{2}O

Hazards
- GHS labelling
Pictograms	(GHS07: Exclamation mark)
Signal word	Warning
Hazard statements	H315, H319
Precautionary statements	P264, P280, P302+P352, P305+P351+P338, P321, P332+P313, P337+P313, P362
- Except where otherwise noted, data are given for materials in their standard state (at 25 °C [77 °F], 100 kPa). verify (what is ?) Infobox references

Aluminon, the triammonium salt of aurintricarboxylic acid, is a dye often used to detect the presence of the aluminium ion in an aqueous solution. Aluminon forms a red complex salt in combination with Al^{3+}.

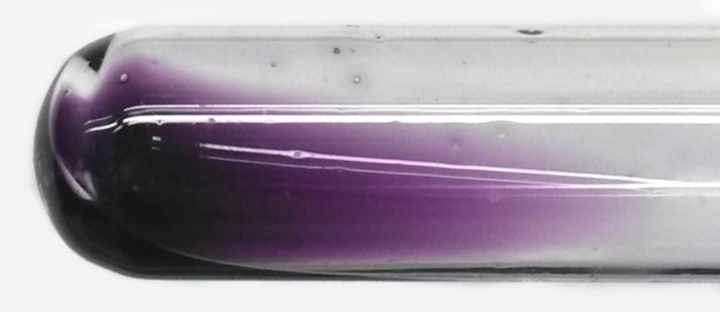
Deep purple pigment in a neutral aqueous solution. Made from aluminon and ferric (Fe^{3+}) ions.

In addition to its use in qualitative inorganic analysis, aluminon has applications in pigment production. It forms brilliantly colored lake pigments with many metals. The pigments are red in combination with Be^{2+} and Ga^{3+}. The pigment is deep purple or reddish-brown in combination with Fe^{3+}. Color of a particular pigment in acidic solutions may change: aluminon and Sc^{3+} form red pigments if the solution is acidic, but otherwise the solutions are colorless.

Aluminon is prepared by reacting sodium nitrite with salicylic acid, adding formaldehyde, then treating with ammonia.

== See also ==
- Analytical chemistry
- Colorimetry
