= Carl Grossberg =

German painter (1894–1940)

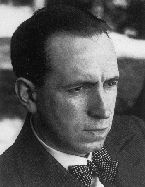
- Photograph c. 1927
- Born: 6 September 1894; Elberfeld
- Died: 19 October 1940 (aged 46) near Laon

Carl Grossberg, originally Georg Carl Wilhelm Grandmontagne (6 September 1894 – 19 October 1940) was a German painter associated with the New Objectivity movement. He is best known for his urban and industrial scenes.

== Career ==
He received his primary education in Lennep and Elberfeld. After 1913, he studied architecture in Aachen and Darmstadt. During that time, his father changed the family name from Grandmontagne to Grossberg; much to Carl's displeasure. He was drafted in 1915 and sent to the World War I front, where he was wounded. After being mustered out in 1918, he returned to Elberfeld.

He resumed his studies in 1919, first with Walther Klemm at the "Hochschule für Bildende Künste" in Weimar. In 1921, he studied under Lyonel Feininger at the Bauhaus. In 1925 Grossberg lived in Sommerhausen near Würzburg. Grossberg and the artist Gustav Decker traveled to Amsterdam and Grossberg established his defining motif based on the constructed urban conditions of the Dutch capital. Over the coming years Grossberg painted the built environment, inspired by the 17th century warehouses, neoclassical retail shops, and modernist housing initiatives in Amsterdam. Capitalism and the local merchants had left a profound smirch on Amsterdam and Grossberg adopted the everyday realism of Dutch Golden Age masters.

== Exhibitions ==
In 1927 Grossberg's art was exhibited at the Galerie Nierendorf in Berlin. Because of the media coverage Grossberg became forever associated with the "Neue Sachlichkeit" movement (New Objectivity) and this new direction in the history of art. His most successful showing came in 1929 at the "Neue Sachlichkeit" exhibition in the Stedelijk Museum in Amsterdam. Two years later, the Prussian Academy of Arts awarded him its "Rompreis".

Grossberg's sober motifs were within the constraints of photography, which emerged as a popular medium at the same time. Contemporary photographers include August Sander. After 1933, he began work on an ambitious series of paintings he called the "Industrial Plan", depicting Germany's most important industries, but it was never completed. The following year, he received a commission for a monumental wall painting, to be displayed at an exhibition called "German People-German Work". A major retrospective was held at the Museum Folkwang in 1935.

In August 1939, he was drafted again and sent as an officer to the Polish front. While on leave in France, he was involved in automobile accident in the Compiègne. His official death is listed as 19 October 1940. While most biographers list Grossberg as dying from the automobile accident, some historians believe that he died from a self-inflicted gunshot wound.

== Selected paintings ==
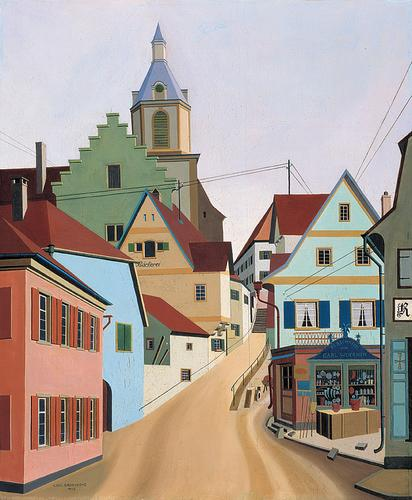
Creglingen, 1926

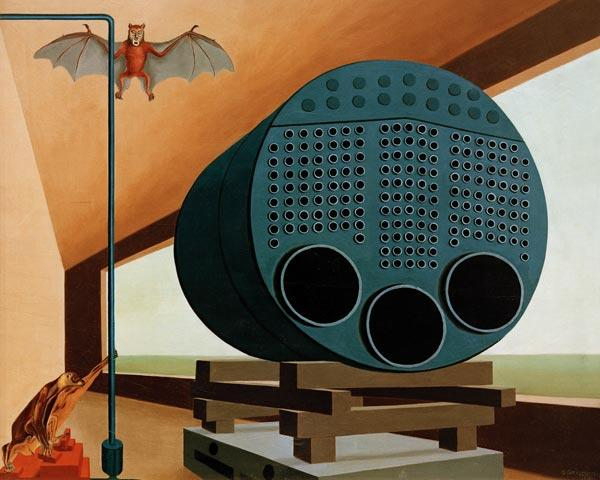
Steam Boiler with Bat, 1928

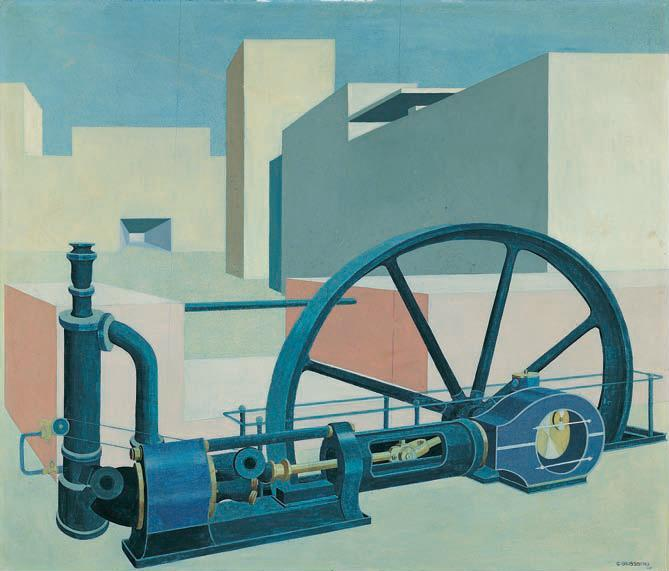
Composition with Turbine, 1929

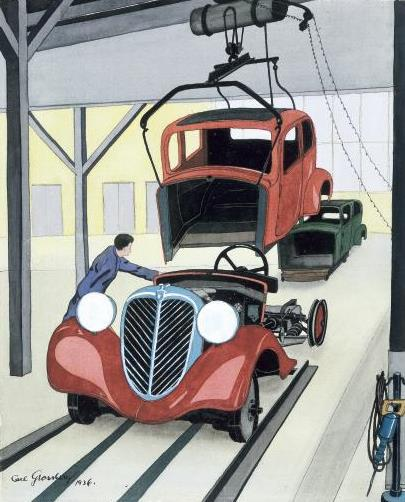
Automobile fabrication, 1936

== Rediscovery ==
In 1980 Grossberg was featured in an exhibition entitled “German Realism of the Twenties: The Artist as Social Critic”. The collection of German "new objectivity" art opened at the Minneapolis Institute of Arts and was later shown at the Museum of Contemporary Art Chicago. The TIME magazine wrote that the artists "believed in the machine-utopias that were an article of faith among the romantics at the Bauhaus".
