= Brilliant green (dye) =

Names
- Other names Malachite green G, Emerald green, Solid green JJO, Diamond green G, Aniline green, Benzaldehyde green, Fast green J

Identifiers
CAS Number	633-03-4
3D model (JSmol)	Interactive image
ChEBI	CHEBI:88173
ChEMBL	ChEMBL1181633
ChemSpider	11941
ECHA InfoCard	100.010.174
PubChem CID	12449
UNII	G0L543D370
CompTox Dashboard (EPA)	DTXSID1048700
- InChI: InChI=1S/C27H33N2.H2O4S/c1-5-28(6-2)25-18-14-23(15-19-25)27(22-12-10-9-11-13-22)24-16-20-26(21-17-24)29(7-3)8-4;1-5(2,3)4/h9-21H,5-8H2,1-4H3;(H2,1,2,3,4)/q+1;/p-1 Key: NNBFNNNWANBMTI-UHFFFAOYSA-M; InChI=1/C27H33N2.H2O4S/c1-5-28(6-2)25-18-14-23(15-19-25)27(22-12-10-9-11-13-22)24-16-20-26(21-17-24)29(7-3)8-4;1-5(2,3)4/h9-21H,5-8H2,1-4H3;(H2,1,2,3,4)/q+1;/p-1 Key: NNBFNNNWANBMTI-REWHXWOFAJ
- SMILES: [O-]S(=O)(=O)O.[N+](=C/1\C=C/C(C=C\1)=C(/c2ccccc2)c3ccc(N(CC)CC)cc3)(\CC)CC

Properties
Chemical formula	C_{27}H_{33}N_{2}.HO_{4}S
Molar mass	482.64 g/mol
Melting point	210 °C (410 °F; 483 K) (decomposes)
Solubility in water	100 g/L a 20 °C
- Except where otherwise noted, data are given for materials in their standard state (at 25 °C [77 °F], 100 kPa). verify (what is ?) Infobox references

Brilliant green (also known as zelyonka or zelenka) is one of the triarylmethane dyes. It is closely related to malachite green.

== Uses ==
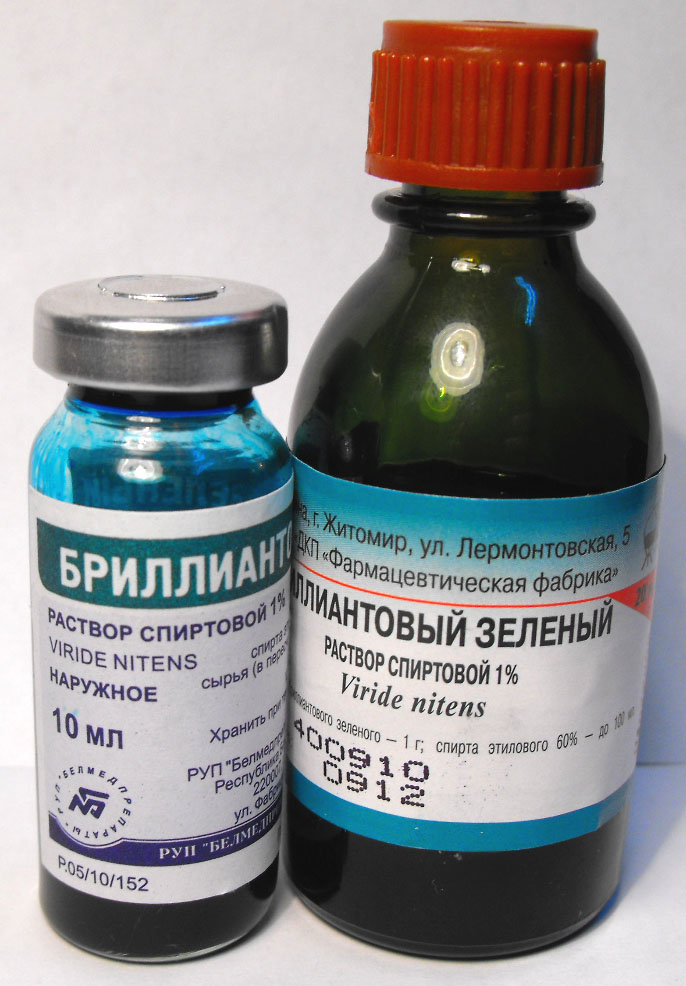
Zelyonka

Brilliant green has been used to color silk and wool.

It is indicated for disinfection of fresh postoperative and post-traumatic scars, umbilical cord of newborns, abrasions, cuts, and other violations of the integrity of the skin, in the treatment of purulent-inflammatory processes of the skin - hordeolum ("barley"), meibomitis, blepharitis, pyoderma, local furunculosis, carbunculosis, staphylococcal infection. It is applied externally, the drug is applied to the damaged surface, capturing the surrounding healthy tissue.

In Russia and Ukraine (and much of the rest of the former Soviet Union), the dilute alcoholic solution of brilliant green is sold as a topical antiseptic, also known under a Latin name solutio viridis nitentis spirituosa and the colloquial Russian name of zelyonka (зелёнка, lit. 'green stuff' in Russian), which is zelenka (зеленка) in Ukrainian.

A 1% solution in 60% alcohol can be used for treatment of skin. 0.5% solution is used for mucous membranes or for infants.

Brilliant green is a visible light-activated photocatalyst in organic synthesis.

== Synthesis ==
The compound may be synthesised through a sequence characteristic of triphenylmethane dyes. Diethylaniline is first condensed with benzaldehyde, producing 4,4′-Bis(diethylamino)triphenylmethane. Oxidation of this intermediate, historically accomplished with manganese peroxide or lead peroxide, gives the corresponding carbinol base. Subsequent treatment with oxalic acid converts the base into the oxalate salt known as Brilliant Green.

== Safety and toxicity ==
Brilliant green is effective against Gram-positive bacteria. The main advantage of brilliant green over the more common antiseptics such as iodine is that it does not irritate mucous membranes as harshly on accidental contact. Soviet medical doctrine deemed it "not for use on mucosa" and cautions that it can cause eye damage and ophthalmic chemical burns and burns to an eye, at least in the typical formulations produced for medical use.

Brilliant green induces vomiting when swallowed and is toxic when ingested. The compound may lead to serious injuries if it comes in contact with an eye, even resulting in bilateral blindness due to corneal opacification.

== Politics ==
In Russia and sometimes in Ukraine, zelyonka has been used to physically attack political opponents. Since 2016, many opponents of the Russian government have been splashed with zelyonka, including Alexei Navalny, Igor Kalyapin, liberal activists, Nadya Tolokonnikova, Maria Alekhina, Lyudmila Ulitskaya, Ilya Varlamov, Mikhail Kasyanov and Maria Ivanova.
