= Methyl violet 6B =

- Methyl violet 6B

Names
- IUPAC name 4-[[4-(dimethylamino)phenyl]-(4-methyliminocyclohexa-2,5-dien-1-ylidene)methyl]-N,N-dimethylaniline hydrochloride
- Other names: Gentian violet B, Methylrosanilinium chloride, Pentamethylparosanilinium chloride, Basic violet 3,

Identifiers
CAS Number	603-47-4
3D model (JSmol)	Interactive image
ChEMBL	ChEMBL1201088
ChemSpider	170606
ECHA InfoCard	100.009.130
EC Number	610-776-8
PubChem CID	164877
UNII	H2G44K8M7S
CompTox Dashboard (EPA)	DTXSID90943876
- InChI: InChI=1S/C24H27N3.ClH/c1-25-21-12-6-18(7-13-21)24(19-8-14-22(15-9-19)26(2)3)20-10-16-23(17-11-20)27(4)5;/h6-17H,1-5H3;1H Key: JFTBTTPUYRGXDG-UHFFFAOYSA-N
- SMILES: CN=C1C=CC(=C(C2=CC=C(C=C2)N(C)C)C3=CC=C(C=C3)N(C)C)C=C1.Cl

Properties
Chemical formula	C_{24}H_{28}N_{3}Cl
Appearance	Green to dark-green powder
Melting point	137 °C (279 °F; 410 K) decomposes
Solubility in water	Soluble in water, ethanol, insoluble in xylene
- Except where otherwise noted, data are given for materials in their standard state (at 25 °C [77 °F], 100 kPa). verify (what is ?) Infobox references

Methyl violet 6B (Pentamethylparosanilinium chloride, 4-[[4-(dimethylamino)phenyl]-(4-methyliminocyclohexa-2,5-dien-1-ylidene)methyl]-N,N-dimethylaniline hydrochloride) is a violet triarylmethane dye from the group of cationic dyes and an essential component of C.I. Basic Violet 1 (trivial name methyl violet). The compound is sometimes equated with methyl violet in the literature.

Methyl violets are mixtures of tetramethyl (2B), pentamethyl (6B) and hexamethyl (10B) pararosanilins.

== Synthesis ==
To produce methyl violet 6B, N,N-dimethylaniline is oxidized with atmospheric oxygen and copper sulfate as a catalyst, using phenol and large amounts of salt as a diluent. The central carbon atom of the dye is provided by the oxidation of a methyl group of N,N-dimethylaniline to formaldehyde. In this process, a reaction product is obtained that contains the tetra- to hexamethylated compounds in addition to the pentamethylated compound.

Synthesis of Methyl violet 6B
