= Creglingen =

- Town
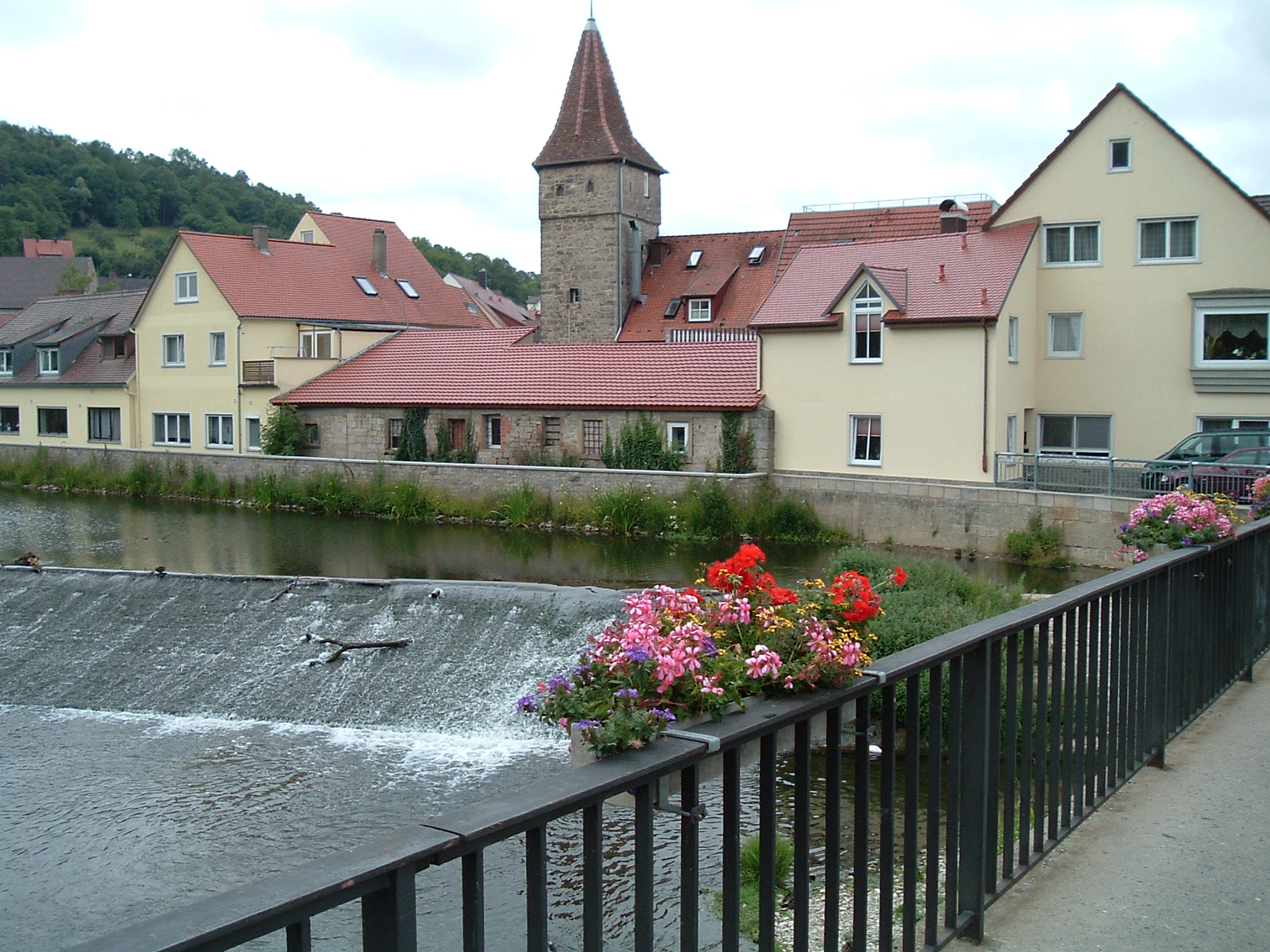

- Coat of arms

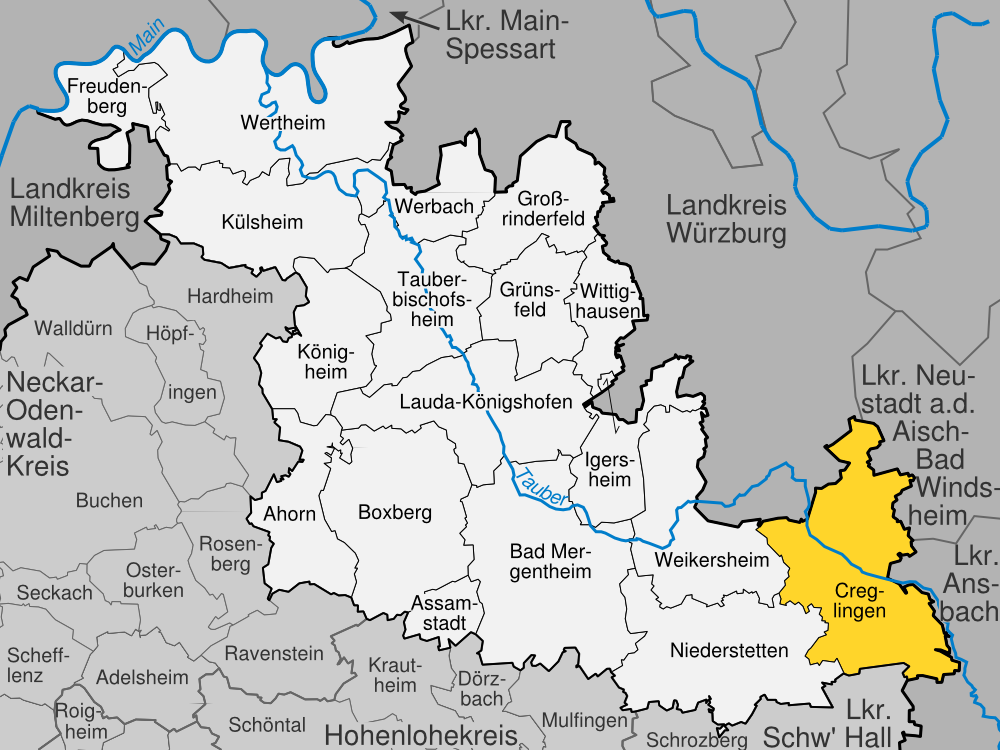
- Location of Creglingen within Main-Tauber-Kreis district
- Interactive map of Creglingen
- Location within Germany Location within Baden-Württemberg
- Coordinates: 49°28′N 10°2′E
- Country: Germany
- State: Baden-Württemberg
- Admin. region: Stuttgart
- District: Main-Tauber-Kreis

Government
  - Mayor (2018–26): Uwe Hehn

Area
  - Total: 117.23 km^{2} (45.26 sq mi)
- Elevation: 278 m (912 ft)

Population (2025-12-31)
  - Total: 4,417
  - Density: 37.68/km^{2} (97.59/sq mi)
- Time zone: UTC+01:00 (CET)
  - Summer (DST): UTC+02:00 (CEST)
- Postal codes: 97993, 97990 (Standorf
- Dialling codes: 07932, 07933, 07939, 09335, 09865
- Vehicle registration: TBB, MGH
- Website: www.creglingen.de

Creglingen (German pronunciation: [ˈkʁeːɡlɪŋən]) is a town in the Main-Tauber district of Baden-Württemberg, Germany. It has around 4,700 inhabitants.

== Geography ==
=== Subdivision ===
The town of Creglingen contains the following districts (since the municipal reform of 1972): Archshofen, Blumweiler, Craintal, Erdbach, Finsterlohr (together with the villages Schonach, Burgstall and Seldeneck), Frauental, Freudenbach, Münster, Niederrimbach, Oberrimbach, Lichtel, Reinsbronn (together with the village of Niedersteinach), Reutsachsen, Schirmbach, Schmerbach, Schön, Schwarzenbronn, Waldmannshofen (together with the village of Sechselbach and the hamlets Fuchshof und Seewiesenhof), Wolfsbuch, Weiler.

== History ==
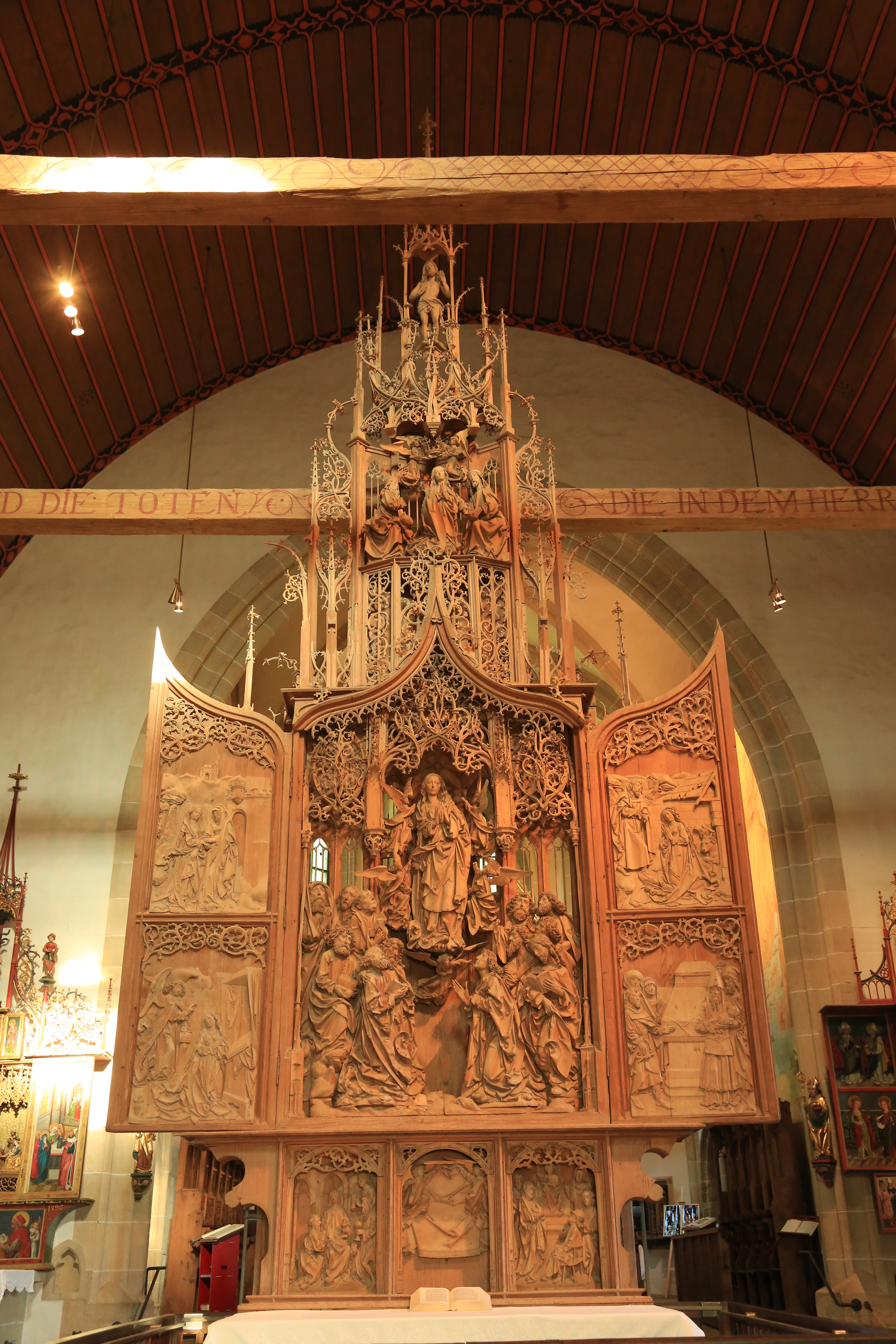
Marienaltar by Tilman Riemenschneider, ca. 1510)

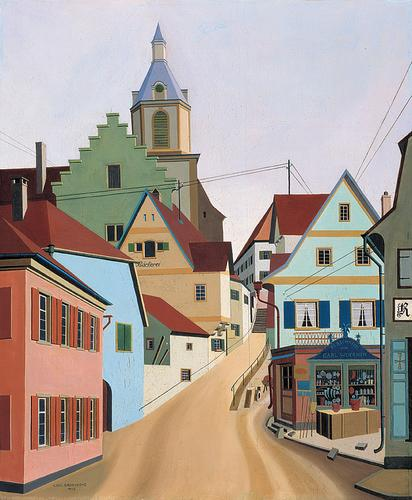
Carl Grossberg Creglingen 1926

The Celts who founded the town between 200 and 100 B.C. also farmed the surrounding plateaus and valleys. In 1349, Creglingen received its town charter from Emperor Karl IV (Charles IV).

== Attractions ==
Creglingen is known for the Herrgottskirche outside of the town. It contains a masterwork of late-Gothic sculpture by Tilman Riemenschneider, the Marienaltar. The church is a pilgrimage chapel, established following a reported discovery of an undamaged communion wafer by a peasant ploughing his field in 1384. This wafer was thought to be the cause of miracles and people flocked to the site. The local lords, Konrad and Gottfried von Hohenlohe-Brauneck, had a Gothic chapel built in 1386–96. At the pilgrimage's peak around 1500 a number of altars were ordered that remain in the church today. The central altar by Riemenschneider was built on the spot where the wafer was reportedly found. The figures are made from the wood of linden trees, the surrounding frames from pine trees. At a total height of 11 meters the altar dominated the small church. Although Reformation reached the area in 1530, its iconoclasm spared the local church. The altar wings of the main altar were closed, however, as the depicted Assumption of Mary was offensive to the Protestant congregations. Its good state of preservation is owed to the fact that the wings of the altar remained closed and the whole was covered by funeral wreaths until 1832.

== Notable people ==
- Gustav Vorherr (1778-1847), architect and economist, Royal Bavarian Baurat
- Georg Pflüger (1835-1896), member of the Reichstag
- Wilhelm Michler (1846-1899), chemist
- Hermann Stern (1866-1933), Holocaust victim
- Ernst Stuhlinger (1913-2008), rocket scientist
- Manfred Hollenbach (born 1946), mayor, politician (CDU), Member of the Landtag of Baden-Württemberg
- Helmut Böttiger (born 1956), writer, literary critic and essayist
