= Diethylaniline =

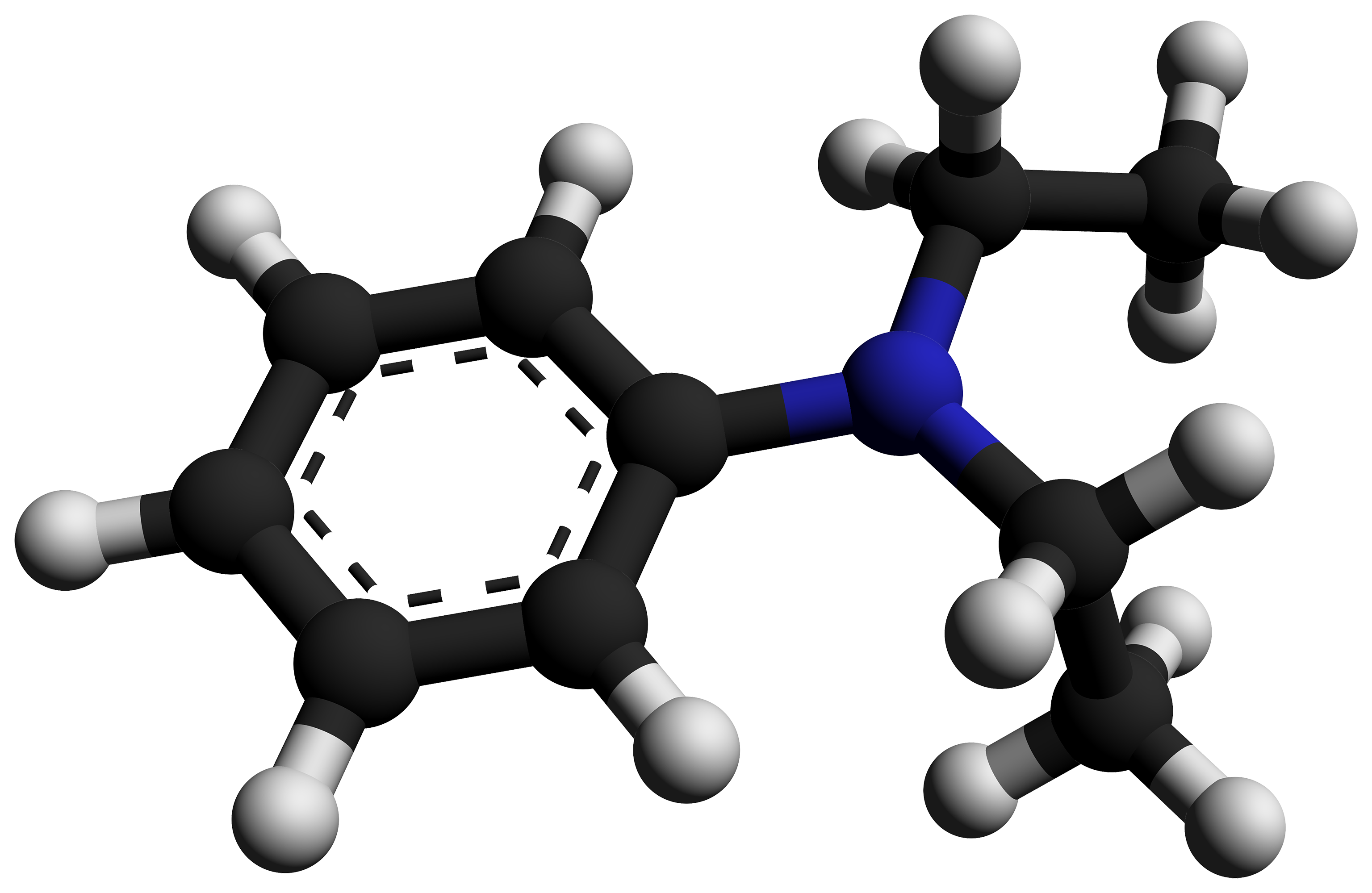

Names
- Preferred IUPAC name N,N-Diethylaniline
- Other names N-Phenyldiethylamine; Diethylaminobenzene

Identifiers
CAS Number	91-66-7
3D model (JSmol)	Interactive image
ChemSpider	6794
ECHA InfoCard	100.001.899
PubChem CID	7061
UNII	1WR1HJ2PGW
CompTox Dashboard (EPA)	DTXSID8021800
- InChI: InChI=1S/C10H15N/c1-3-11(4-2)10-8-6-5-7-9-10/h5-9H,3-4H2,1-2H3 Key: GGSUCNLOZRCGPQ-UHFFFAOYSA-N; InChI=1/C10H15N/c1-3-11(4-2)10-8-6-5-7-9-10/h5-9H,3-4H2,1-2H3 Key: GGSUCNLOZRCGPQ-UHFFFAOYAA
- SMILES: N(c1ccccc1)(CC)CC

Properties
Chemical formula	C_{10}H_{15}N
Molar mass	149.237 g·mol^{−1}
Appearance	Colorless to yellowish liquid
Odor	Aniline-like
Density	0.93 g/mL
Melting point	−38 °C (−36 °F; 235 K)
Boiling point	216 °C (421 °F; 489 K)
Solubility in water	0.13 g/L

Hazards
Flash point	83 °C (181 °F; 356 K)
Autoignition temperature	330 °C (626 °F; 603 K)
- Except where otherwise noted, data are given for materials in their standard state (at 25 °C [77 °F], 100 kPa). Infobox references

Diethylaniline is the organic compound with the molecular formula (C_{2}H_{5})_{2}NC_{6}H_{5}. It is a colorless liquid but commercial samples are often yellow. It is a precursor to several dyes and other commercial products.

== Uses ==
Its condensation with half an equivalent of benzaldehyde gives brilliant green, an analogue of the very useful malachite green. With formylbenzenedisulfonic acid it condenses to give Patent blue VE, and with hydroxybenzaldehyde followed by sulfonation one obtains Patent blue V. When treated with phosgene, one obtains Ethyl violet, an analogue of methyl violet.

In organic synthesis, the complex diethylaniline·borane (DEANB) is used as a reducing agent.

Diethylaniline and dimethylaniline are both used as acid-absorbing bases. The advantage to the diethyl derivative is that [C_{6}H_{5}NEt_{2}H]Cl is non-hygroscopic, in contrast to [C_{6}H_{5}NMe_{2}H]Cl.

== Safety ==
Diethylaniline may be genotoxic because it has been found to increase the rate of sister chromatid exchange.

== See also ==
- Dimethylaniline
