= Kanamienamide =

Names
- Preferred IUPAC name (2E)-3-Methoxy-N-{(1Z)-5-[(3S,6R,8S,11S)-4,6,8-trimethyl-3-(2-methylpropyl)-2,5-dioxo-1-oxa-4-azacycloundecan-11-yl]pent-1-en-1-yl}pent-2-enamide

Identifiers
3D model (JSmol)	Interactive image
ChemSpider	58197334
PubChem CID	132915918
CompTox Dashboard (EPA)	DTXSID901336314
- InChI: InChI=1S/C28H48N2O5/c1-9-23(34-8)19-26(31)29(6)16-12-10-11-13-24-15-14-21(4)18-22(5)27(32)30(7)25(17-20(2)3)28(33)35-24/h12,16,19-22,24-25H,9-11,13-15,17-18H2,1-8H3/b16-12-,23-19-/t21-,22+,24-,25-/m0/s1 Key: MTZDCZNHECVTPF-ZIXRUXROSA-N
- SMILES: CCC(=CC(=O)N(C)C=CCCCC1CCC(CC(C(=O)N(C(C(=O)O1)CC(C)C)C)C)C)OC

Properties
Chemical formula	C_{28}H_{48}N_{2}O_{5}
Molar mass	492.701 g·mol^{−1}
- Except where otherwise noted, data are given for materials in their standard state (at 25 °C [77 °F], 100 kPa). Infobox references

Kanamienamides is a complex enol ether containing enamide that is currently undergoing research in regards to its inhibitory activity towards cancer cells. The synthesis of kanamienamide consists of several chemical techniques, including CBS asymmetric reduction, Stork-Zhao-Wittig olefination, Cu-mediated amide coupling with vinyl iodide, Evans asymmetric alkylation, and ring-closing metathesis. Kanamienamide is a natural product found in Moorea bouillonii which is a cyanobacterium.
