= 4,4'-Bis(dimethylamino)benzhydrol =

4,4′-Bis(dimethylamino)benzhydrol

Names
- Preferred IUPAC name Bis[4-(dimethylamino)phenyl]methanol
- Other names Michler's hydrol; 4,4′-Bisdimethylaminodiphenylcarbinol

Identifiers
CAS Number	119-58-4
3D model (JSmol)	Interactive image
ChemSpider	83720
ECHA InfoCard	100.003.941
EC Number	204-335-5
PubChem CID	92742
UNII	LC557799DG
CompTox Dashboard (EPA)	DTXSID0051603
- InChI: InChI=1S/C17H22N2O/c1-18(2)15-9-5-13(6-10-15)17(20)14-7-11-16(12-8-14)19(3)4/h5-12,17,20H,1-4H3 Key: YLZSIUVOIFJGQZ-UHFFFAOYSA-N
- SMILES: CN(C)C1=CC=C(C=C1)C(C2=CC=C(C=C2)N(C)C)O

Properties
Chemical formula	C_{17}H_{22}N_{2}O
Molar mass	270.376 g·mol^{−1}
Appearance	White solid
Melting point	98–100 °C (208–212 °F; 371–373 K)

Hazards
- GHS labelling
Pictograms	(GHS07: Exclamation mark)
Signal word	Warning
Hazard statements	H315, H319, H335
Precautionary statements	P261, P264, P271, P280, P302+P352, P304+P340, P305+P351+P338, P312, P321, P332+P313, P337+P313, P362, P403+P233, P405, P501
- Except where otherwise noted, data are given for materials in their standard state (at 25 °C [77 °F], 100 kPa). Infobox references

4,4′-Bis(dimethylamino)benzhydrol is an organic compound with the formula (Me_{2}NC_{6}H_{4})_{2}CH(OH), where Me is methyl. It is a white solid that is soluble is a variety of organic solvents. The compound is notable as the reduced derivative of Michler's ketone. It is a precursor to triarylmethane dyes.
