= Victoria blue R =

Names
- IUPAC name [4-[Bis[4-(dimethylamino)phenyl]methylidene]naphthalen-1-ylidene]-ethylazanium chloride
- Other names Basic Blue 11; Victoria Blue RS; Victoria Lake Blue R; Basic Blue; Hidaco Victoria Blue R; Aizen Victoria Blue BOH

Identifiers
CAS Number	2185-86-6
3D model (JSmol)	Interactive image
ChEBI	CHEBI:90518
ChemSpider	11519753
ECHA InfoCard	100.016.884
EC Number	218-572-7
PubChem CID	16599
CompTox Dashboard (EPA)	DTXSID90883804
- InChI: InChI=1S/C29H31N3.ClH/c1-6-30-28-20-19-27(25-9-7-8-10-26(25)28)29(21-11-15-23(16-12-21)31(2)3)22-13-17-24(18-14-22)32(4)5;/h7-20H,6H2,1-5H3;1H Key: JEVGKYBUANQAKG-UHFFFAOYSA-N
- SMILES: [Cl-].C1=CC(C=CC1=[N+](C)C)=C(C=2C=3C=CC=CC3C(=CC2)NCC)C=4C=CC(=CC4)N(C)C

Properties
Chemical formula	C_{29}H_{32}ClN_{3}
Molar mass	458.05 g·mol^{−1}
- Except where otherwise noted, data are given for materials in their standard state (at 25 °C [77 °F], 100 kPa). Infobox references

Victoria blue R is a dye of the triarylmethane class with formula C_{29}H_{32}N_{3}Cl. It has a blue colour that changes to yellow at pH values below 1.

== Physical data ==
Fastness

The dye exerts a high light fastness and washing fastness.

UV/VIS absorption

Victoria Blue R has an absorption peak of around 610 nm.

== Extra reading ==
- Mai, F.D.; Lu, C.S.; Wu, C.W.; Huang, C.H.; Chen, J.Y.; Chen, C.C. (1 September 2008). "Mechanisms of photocatalytic degradation of Victoria Blue R using nano-TiO2". Separation and Purification Technology. 62 (2): 423–436. doi:10.1016/j.seppur.2008.02.006.
