= Victoria blue BO =

Names
- Other names C.I. Basic Blue 7; C.I. 42595

Identifiers
CAS Number	2390-60-5
3D model (JSmol)	Interactive image
ChEMBL	ChEMBL3182706
ChemSpider	11232307
ECHA InfoCard	100.017.485
EC Number	219-232-0
PubChem CID	75444
UNII	30F6F48H95
CompTox Dashboard (EPA)	DTXSID5038888
- InChI: InChI=1S/C33H39N3.ClH/c1-6-34-32-24-23-31(29-13-11-12-14-30(29)32)33(25-15-19-27(20-16-25)35(7-2)8-3)26-17-21-28(22-18-26)36(9-4)10-5;/h11-24H,6-10H2,1-5H3;1H Key: ROVRRJSRRSGUOL-UHFFFAOYSA-N
- SMILES: [Cl-].CCNc1ccc(c2ccccc12)C(c3ccc(cc3)N(CC)CC)=C4C=CC(C=C4)=[N+](CC)CC

Properties
Chemical formula	C_{33}H_{40}N_{3}Cl (chloride); C_{33}H_{41}N_{3}O (hydroxide)
Appearance	Reddish blue powder

Hazards
- GHS labelling
Pictograms	(GHS05: Corrosive) (GHS06: Toxic) (GHS07: Exclamation mark) (GHS09: Environmental hazard)
Signal word	Danger
Hazard statements	H301, H315, H318, H319, H410
Precautionary statements	P264, P270, P273, P280, P301+P310, P302+P352, P305+P351+P338, P310, P321, P330, P332+P313, P337+P313, P362, P391, P405, P501
- Except where otherwise noted, data are given for materials in their standard state (at 25 °C [77 °F], 100 kPa). Infobox references

Victoria blue BO, also known as C.I. Basic Blue 7 and C.I. 42595, is a chloride salt of a dye with the chemical formula [C_{33}H_{40}N_{3}]Cl. It has the appearance of a reddish blue powder. Victoria Blue BO base, also known as Solvent Blue 5 and C.I. 42595:1, is the hydroxide derivative of the same cation. Its chemical formula is [C_{33}H_{40}N_{3}]OH. Victoria blues are members of the triarylmethane dyes, but unlike most such dyes, the Victoria blues have a naphthylamine group.

== Uses ==
Victoria Blue BO is used to dye anionic substrates, e.g. wool, silk, nylon, and acrylics, where bright dying is required. It is also used for staining in microscopy, where it is used to stain mitochondria. As Solvent Blue 5, it is used in some pyrotechnic compositions for blue colored smoke. It is used to dye wool and silk directly producing a violet blue colour but cotton must be mordant with tannin.

Victoria blue BO is a photosensitizer.
