= Methyl violet =

Group of chemical compounds used as dye

Methyl violet is a family of triphenylmethane organic compounds that are mainly used as dyes. Depending on the number of attached methyl groups, the color of the dye can be altered. Its main use is as a purple dye for textiles and to give deep violet colors in paint and ink. It is also used as a hydration indicator for silica gel. Methyl violet 10B is also known as crystal violet (and many other names) and has medical uses.

== Structure ==
The term methyl violet encompasses three compounds that differ in the number of methyl groups attached to the amine functional group. Methyl violets are mixtures of tetramethyl (2B), pentamethyl (6B) and hexamethyl (10B) pararosanilins.

They are all soluble in water, ethanol, diethylene glycol and dipropylene glycol.

| Name | Methyl violet 2B | Methyl violet 6B | Methyl violet 10B (Crystal violet) | Mixture |
| Structure | | | Methyl violet 10B | |
| Formula (salt) | C_{23}H_{26}ClN_{3} | C_{24}H_{28}ClN_{3} | C_{25}H_{30}ClN_{3} | |
| CAS no | 84215-49-6 | 603-47-4 | 548-62-9 | 8004-87-3 |
| C.I. | 42536 | 42535 | 42555 | |
| ChemSpider ID | 21164086 | 170606 | 10588 | |
| PubChem ID | 91997555 | 164877 | 11057 | |
| Formula (cation) | C_{23}H_{26}N_{3}^{+} | C_{24}H_{28}N_{3}^{+} | C_{25}H_{30}N_{3}^{+} | |
| ChemSpider ID | | 2006225 | 3349, 9080056, 10354393 | |
| PubChem ID | | 2724053 | 3468 | |

=== Methyl violet 2B ===
Methyl violet 2B (IUPAC name: 4,4′-((4-Iminocyclohexa-2,5-dien-1-ylidene)methylene)bis(N,N-dimethylaniline) monohydrochloride) is a green powder which is soluble in water and ethanol but not in xylene. It appears yellow in solution of low pH (approximately 0.15) and changes to violet with pH increasing toward 3.2.

=== Methyl violet 10B ===
Methyl violet 10B has six methyl groups. It is known in medicine as Gentian violet (or crystal violet or pyoctanin(e)) and is the active ingredient in a Gram stain, used to classify bacteria. It is used as a pH indicator, with a range between 0 and 1.6. The protonated form (found in acidic conditions) is yellow, turning blue-violet above pH levels of 1.6.

Methyl violet 10B inhibits the growth of many Gram positive bacteria, except streptococci. When used in conjunction with nalidixic acid (which destroys gram-negative bacteria), it can be used to isolate the streptococci bacteria for the diagnosis of an infection.

== Degradation ==
Methyl violet is a mutagen and mitotic poison, therefore concerns exist regarding the ecological impact of the release of methyl violet into the environment. Methyl violet has been used in vast quantities for textile and paper dyeing, and 15% of such dyes produced worldwide are released to environment in wastewater. Numerous methods have been developed to treat methyl violet pollution. The three most prominent are chemical bleaching, biodegradation, and photodegradation.

=== Chemical bleaching ===
Chemical bleaching is achieved by oxidation or reduction. Oxidation can destroy the dye completely, e.g. through the use of sodium hypochlorite (NaClO, common bleach) or hydrogen peroxide. Reduction of methyl violet occurs in microorganisms but can be attained chemically using sodium dithionite.

=== Biodegradation ===
Biodegradation has been well investigated because of its relevance to sewage plants with specialized microorganisms. Two microorganisms that have been studied in depth are the white rot fungus and the bacterium Nocardia corallina.

=== Photodegradation ===
Light alone does not rapidly degrade methyl violet, but the process is accelerated upon the addition of large band-gap semiconductors, titanium dioxide or zinc oxide.

=== Other methods ===
Many other methods have been developed to treat the contamination of dyes in a solution, including electrochemical degradation, ion exchange, laser degradation, and absorption onto various solids such as activated charcoal.

== See also ==
- Fuchsine
- Methylene blue
- Methyl blue
- Egyptian Blue
- Han Purple
- Fluorescein
