= Dimethylaniline =

N,N-Dimethylaniline

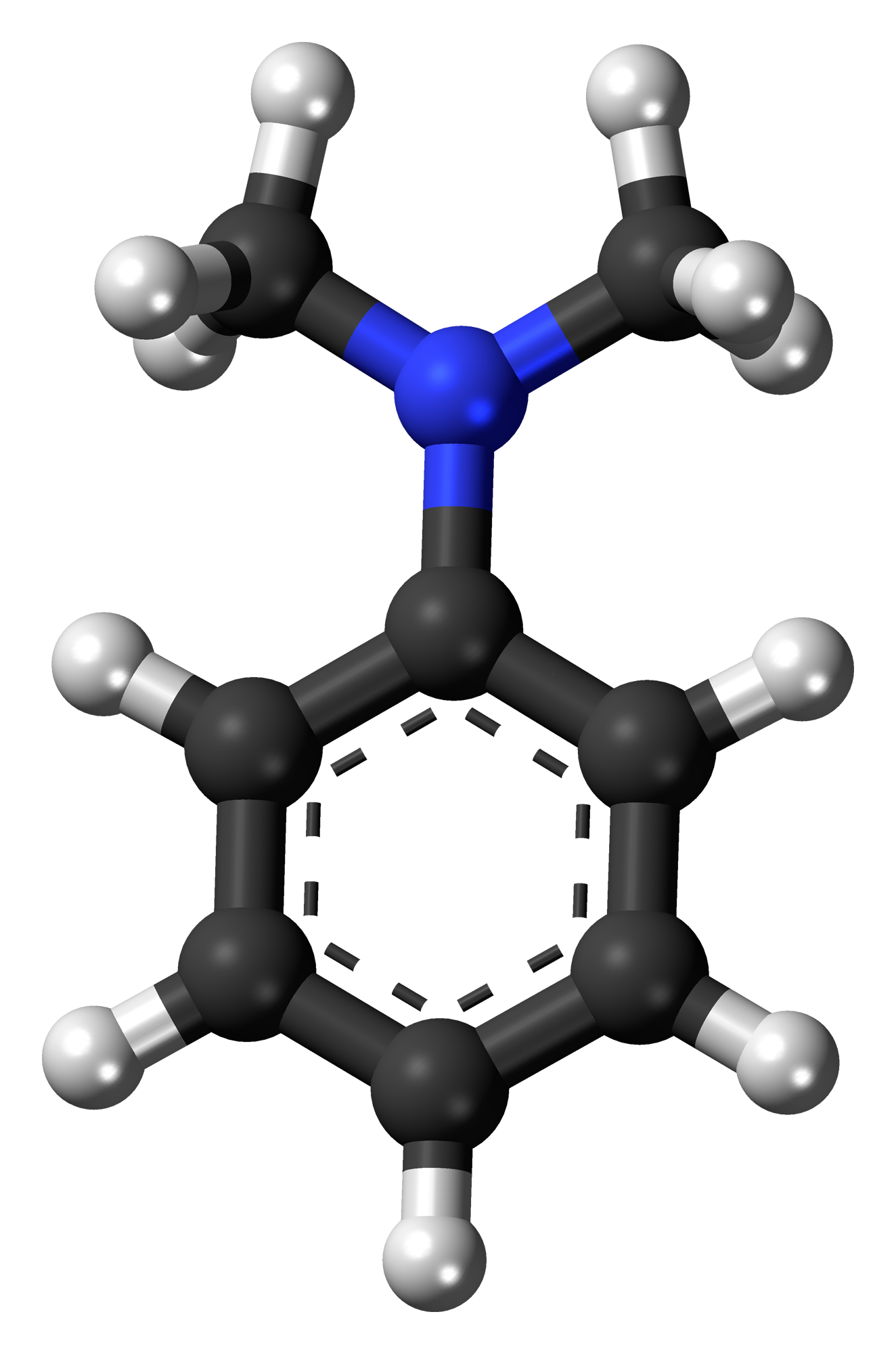

Names
- Preferred IUPAC name N,N-Dimethylaniline
- Other names DMA; Dimethylaminobenzene; N,N-Dimethylbenzeneamine; N,N-Dimethylphenylamine

Identifiers
CAS Number	121-69-7
3D model (JSmol)	Interactive image
ChEBI	CHEBI:16269
ChEMBL	ChEMBL371654
ChemSpider	924
ECHA InfoCard	100.004.085
KEGG	C02846
PubChem CID	949
UNII	7426719369
CompTox Dashboard (EPA)	DTXSID2020507
- InChI: InChI=1S/C8H11N/c1-9(2)8-6-4-3-5-7-8/h3-7H,1-2H3 Key: JLTDJTHDQAWBAV-UHFFFAOYSA-N
- SMILES: CN(C)c1ccccc1

Properties
Chemical formula	C_{8}H_{11}N
Molar mass	121.183 g·mol^{−1}
Appearance	Colorless liquid
Odor	amine-like
Density	0.956 g/mL
Melting point	2 °C (36 °F; 275 K)
Boiling point	194 °C (381 °F; 467 K)
Solubility in water	2% (20°C)
Vapor pressure	1 mmHg (20°C)
Magnetic susceptibility (χ)	−89.66·10^{−6} cm^{3}/mol

Hazards
Flash point	63 °C (145 °F; 336 K)
- Lethal dose or concentration (LD, LC)
LD_{50} (median dose)	1410 mg/kg (rat, oral)
LC_{Lo} (lowest published)	50 ppm (rat, 4 hr)
- NIOSH (US health exposure limits)
PEL (Permissible)	TWA 5 ppm (25 mg/m^{3}) [skin]
REL (Recommended)	TWA 5 ppm (25 mg/m^{3}) ST 10 ppm (50 mg/m^{3}) [skin]
IDLH (Immediate danger)	100 ppm
Safety data sheet (SDS)	External MSDS
- Except where otherwise noted, data are given for materials in their standard state (at 25 °C [77 °F], 100 kPa). verify (what is ?) Infobox references

N,N-Dimethylaniline (DMA) is an organic chemical compound, a substituted derivative of aniline. It is a tertiary amine, featuring a dimethylamino group attached to a phenyl group. This oily liquid is colourless when pure, but commercial samples are often yellow. It is an important precursor to dyes such as crystal violet.

== Preparation ==
DMA was first reported in 1850 by the German chemist A. W. Hofmann, who prepared it by heating aniline and iodomethane:

C_{6}H_{5}NH_{2} + 2 CH_{3}I → C_{6}H_{5}N(CH_{3})_{2} + 2 HI

DMA is produced industrially by alkylation of aniline with methanol in the presence of an acid catalyst:

C_{6}H_{5}NH_{2} + 2 CH_{3}OH → C_{6}H_{5}N(CH_{3})_{2} + 2 H_{2}O

Similarly, it is also prepared using dimethyl ether as the methylating agent.

== Reactions ==
Dimethylaniline undergoes many of the reactions expected for an aniline, being weakly basic and reactive toward electrophiles.

It is nitrated to produce tetryl, a derivative with four nitro groups which was once used as explosive. In acidic solution, the initial nitration gives 3-nitrodimethylaniline. It reacts with butyllithium to give the 2-lithio derivative. Electrophilic methylating agents like dimethyl sulfate attack the amine to give the quaternary ammonium salt:

C_{6}H_{5}N(CH_{3})_{2} +(CH_{3}O)_{2}SO_{2} → C_{6}H_{5}N(CH_{3})_{3}CH_{3}OSO_{3}

Diethylaniline and dimethylaniline are both used as acid-absorbing bases.

== Applications ==
DMA is a key precursor to commercially important triarylmethane dyes such as malachite green and crystal violet. DMA serves as a promoter in the curing of polyester and vinyl ester resins. DMA is also used as a precursor to other organic compounds. A study of the in vitro metabolism of N,N-dimethylaniline using guinea pig and rabbit preparations and GLC techniques has confirmed N-demethylation and N-oxidation as metabolic pathways, and has also established ring hydroxylation as a metabolic route.
