= Triarylmethane dye =

Class of dye

Triarylmethane dyes are synthetic organic compounds containing triphenylmethane backbones. As dyes, these compounds are intensely colored. They are produced industrially as dyes.

According to a proposal made by Siegfried Dähne in 1965, triphenylmethane dyes should more accurately be referred to as triphenylmethine dyes, since the central carbon atom is not sp^{3}-, but rather sp^{2} -hybridized.

== Families ==
Triarylmethane dyes can be grouped into families according to the nature of the substituents on the aryl groups. In some cases, the anions associated with the cationic dyes (say crystal violet) vary even though the name of the dye does not. Often it is shown as chloride.

=== Methyl violet dyes ===
Methyl violet dyes have dimethylamino groups at the p-positions of two aryl groups.

Methyl violet dyes

Methyl violet 2B

Methyl violet 6B

Methyl violet 10B

=== Fuchsine dyes ===
Fuchsine dyes have primary or secondary amines (NH_{2} or NHMe) functional groups at the p-positions of each aryl group.

Fuchsine dyes

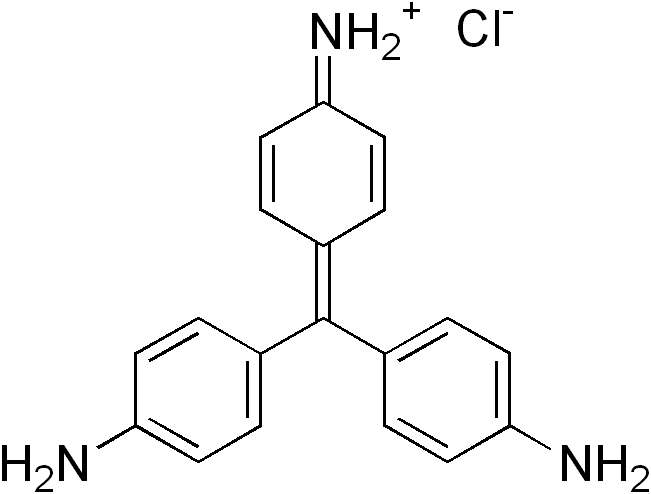
Pararosaniline

Fuchsine (hydrochloride salt)

New fuchsine (As chloride)

Fuchsine acid

=== Phenol dyes ===
Phenol dyes have hydroxyl groups at the p positions of at least two aryl groups.

Phenol dyes

Phenolphthalein

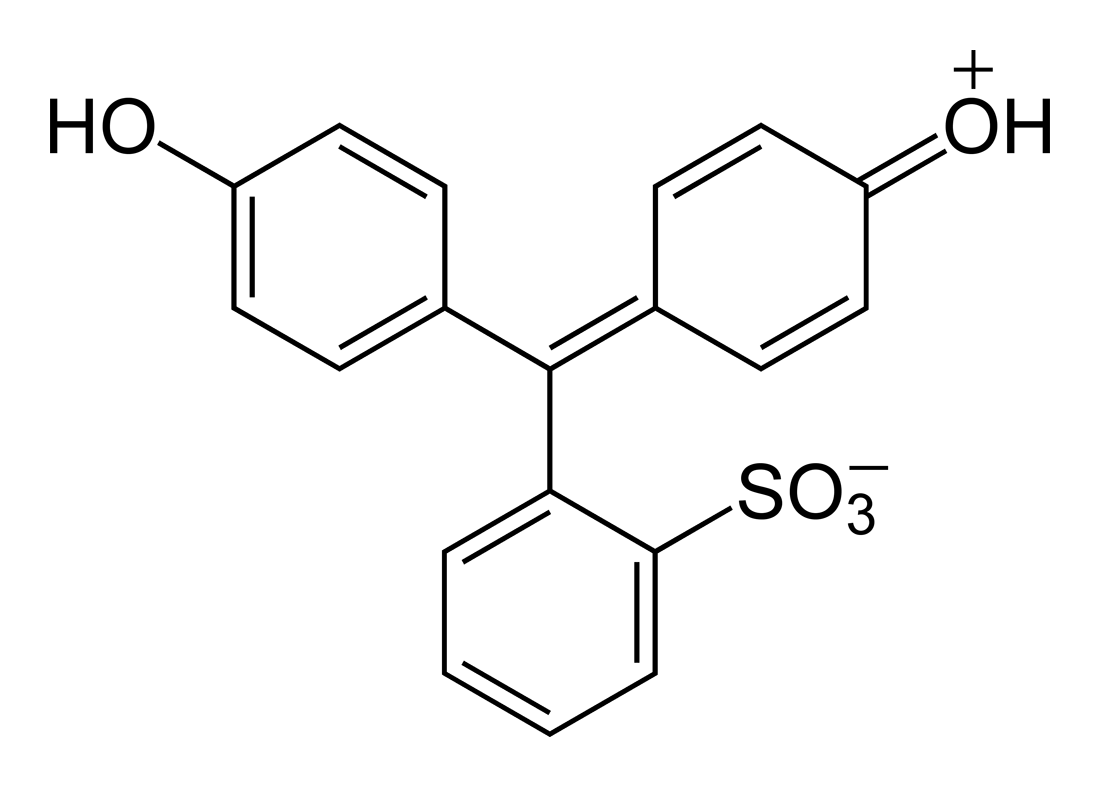
Phenol red

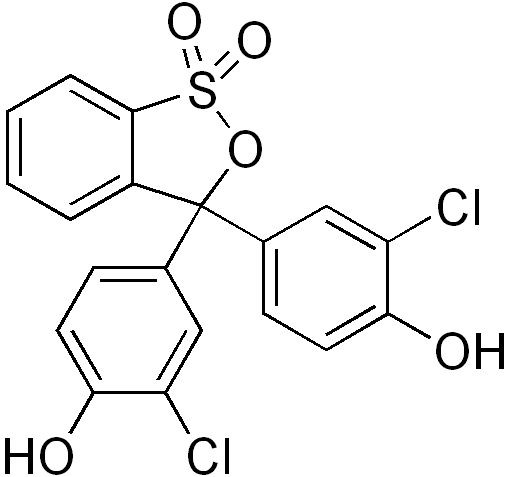
Chlorophenol red

Cresol red

Bromocresol purple

Bromocresol green

=== Malachite green dyes ===
Malachite green dyes are related to the methyl violet dyes, except that they contain one phenyl (C_{6}H_{5}) group.

Malachite green dyes

Malachite green

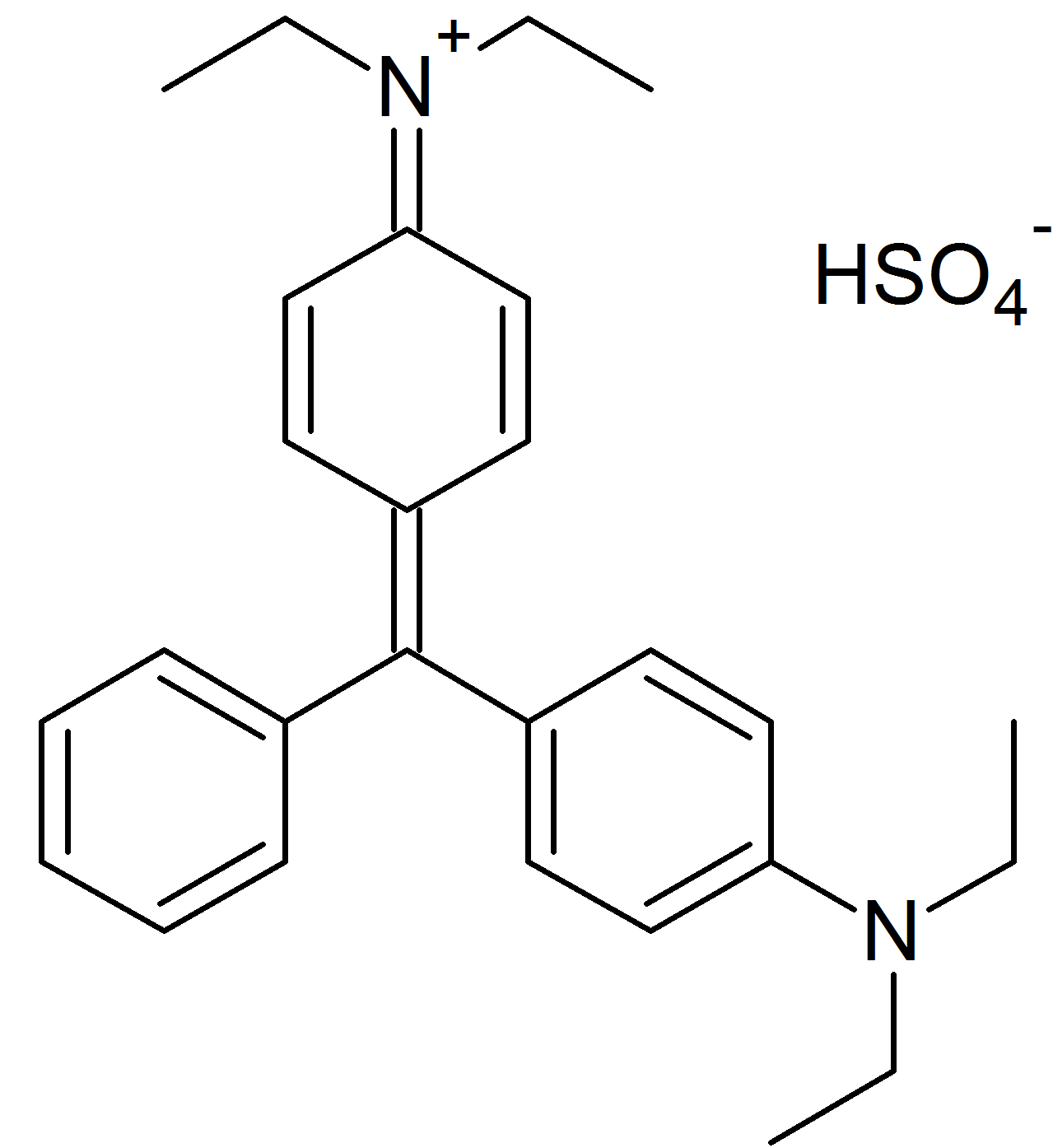
Brilliant green (dye)

Brilliant blue FCF, a common food colorant

=== Victoria blue dyes ===
Victoria blue dyes are related to the methyl violet dyes, except they contain one naphthylamino group. Variation is found is dimethylamine vs diethylamino substituents on the phenyl rings and variations of the secondary amine on the naphthyl group.

Victoria blue dyes

Victoria blue B

Victoria blue FBR

Victoria blue BO

Victoria blue FGA

Victoria blue 4 R

Victoria blue R

=== Xanthene dyes ===
Xanthene dyes feature a xanthene core. They are not widely used as textiles, but for other applications.

Xanthene dyes

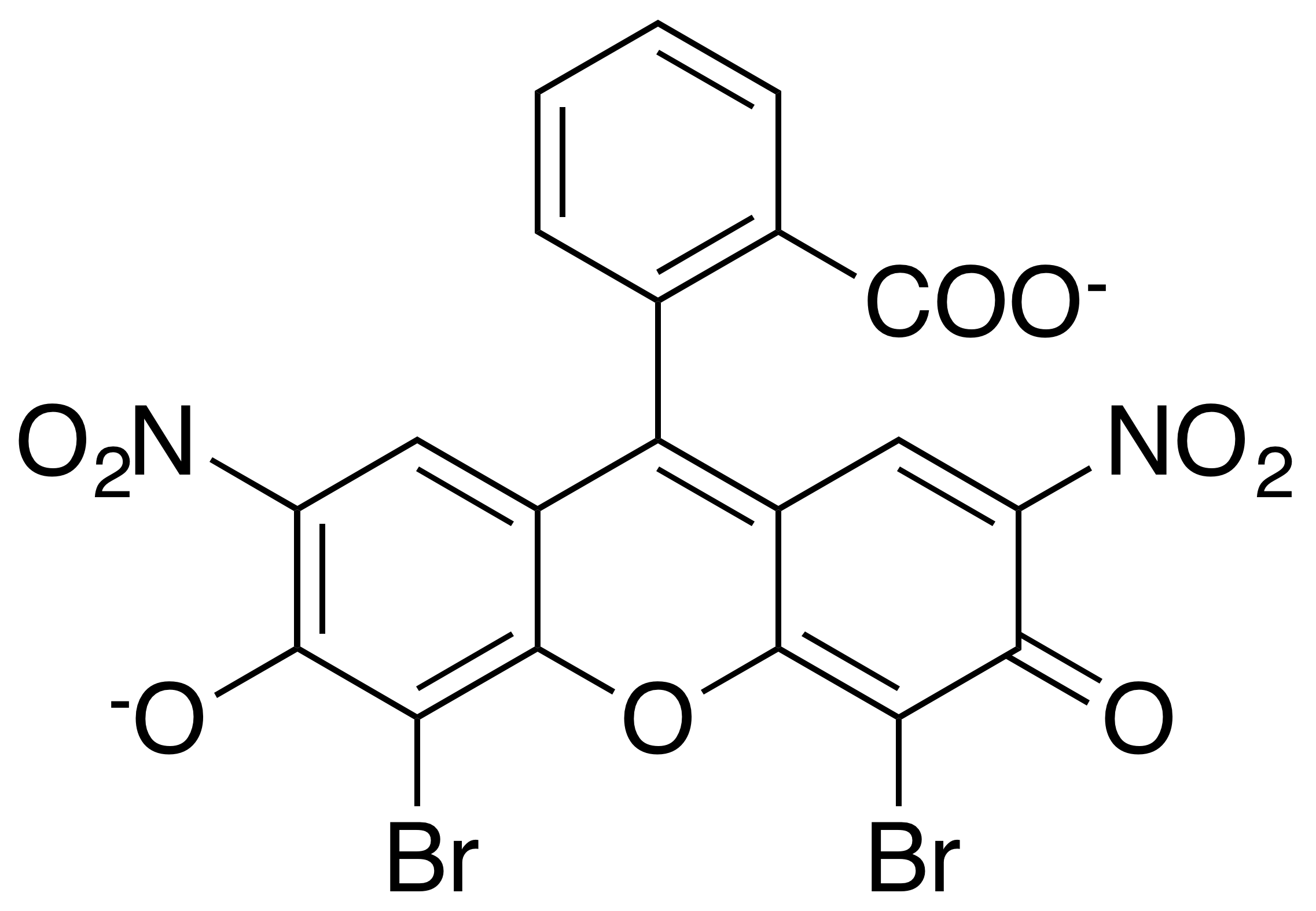
Eosin B

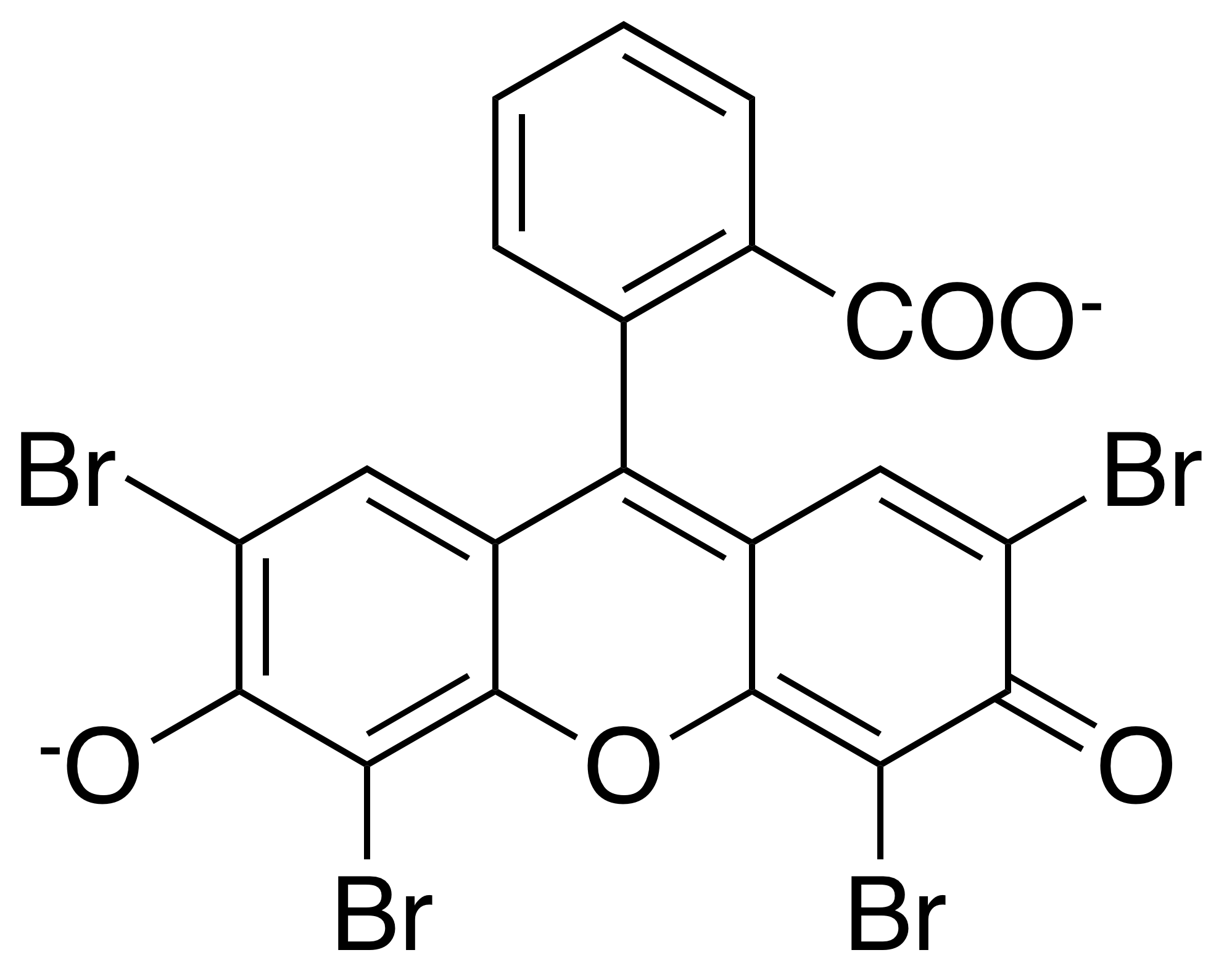
Eosin Y

Rhodamine B

Rhodamine 123

Fluorescein

== Bridged arenes ==
Where two of the aryl groups are bridged by a heteroatom, these triarylmethane compounds may be further categorized into acridines (nitrogen-bridged), xanthenes (oxygen-bridged), and thioxanthenes (sulfur-bridged).

== Synthesis ==
The amine-containing dyes are often prepared from Michler's ketone or its diethylamino analogue. In this way, the third aryl group is readily differentiated. The Friedel–Crafts alkylation reaction is a popular method to prepare many of the phenolic derivatives:

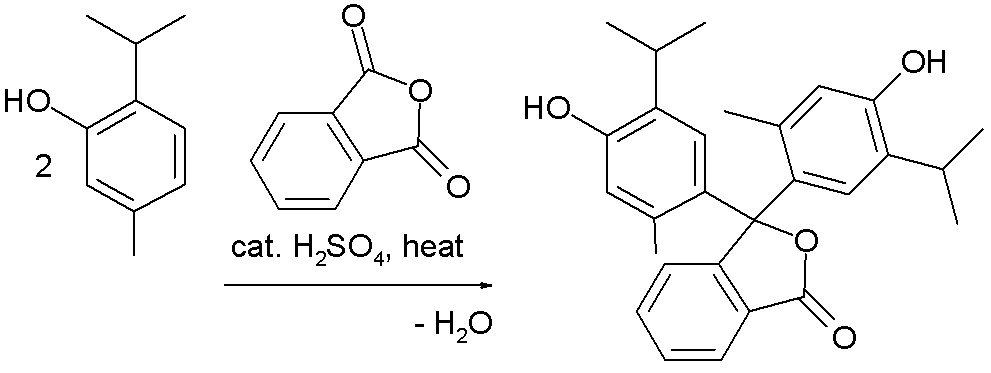

== Applications ==
In addition to their dominant use as dyes, many of these dyes react reversibly with acids and bases, and thus serve as pH indicators.

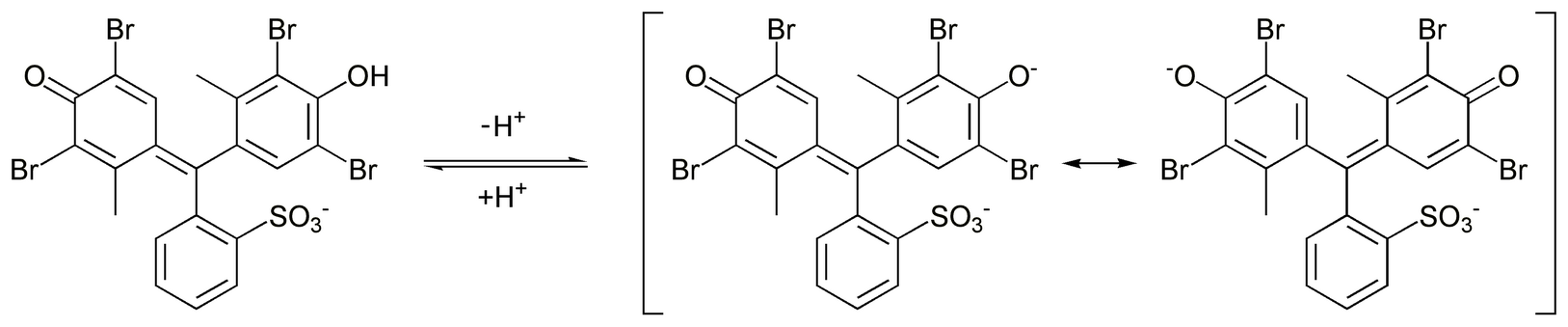

== See also ==
- Zelyonka attack
- Phthalein dye
