= Herbert Conn =

Herbert Conn may refer to:

- Herb Conn, American rock climber and cave explorer
- Herbert William Conn, American bacteriologist and educator
