= Schaeffer–Fulton stain =

Endospore isolation technique

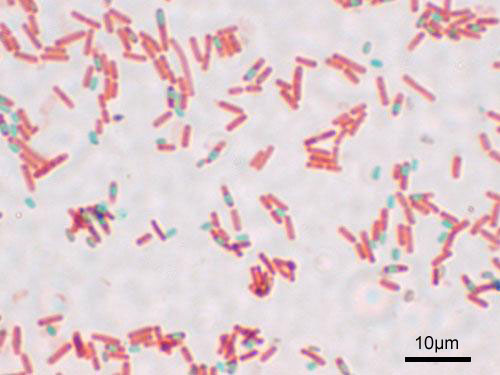
A stained preparation of Bacillus subtilis showing endospores as green and the vegetative cell as red

The Schaeffer–Fulton stain is a technique designed to isolate endospores by staining any present endospores green, and any other bacterial bodies red. The primary stain is malachite green, and the counterstain is safranin, which dyes any other bacterial bodies red.

Endospores cannot be stained by normal staining procedures because their walls are practically impermeable to all chemicals. The Schaeffer- Fulton endospore stain uses heat to drive the primary stain (malachite green) into the endospore. After cooling, the slide is decolorized with water and counterstained with safranin.

== Procedure ==
Using an aseptic technique, bacteria are placed on a slide and heat fixed. The slide is then suspended over a water bath with some sort of porus paper over it, so that the slide is steamed. Malachite green is applied to the slide, which can penetrate the tough walls of the endospores, staining them green. After five minutes, the slide is removed from the steam, and the paper towel is removed. After cooling, the slide is rinsed with water for thirty seconds. The slide is then stained with diluted safranin for two minutes, which stains most other microorganic bodies red or pink. The slide is then rinsed again, and blotted dry with bibulous paper.

After drying, the slide can then be viewed under a light microscope.

== History ==
The procedure was designed by Alice B. Schaeffer and MacDonald Fulton, two microbiologists at Middlebury College, during the 1930s. The procedure also goes by the name Wirtz-Conklin method, referring to two bacteriologists during the 1900s.

== See also ==
- Moeller stain
