= Bismarck brown Y =

Chemical compound and histologic dye

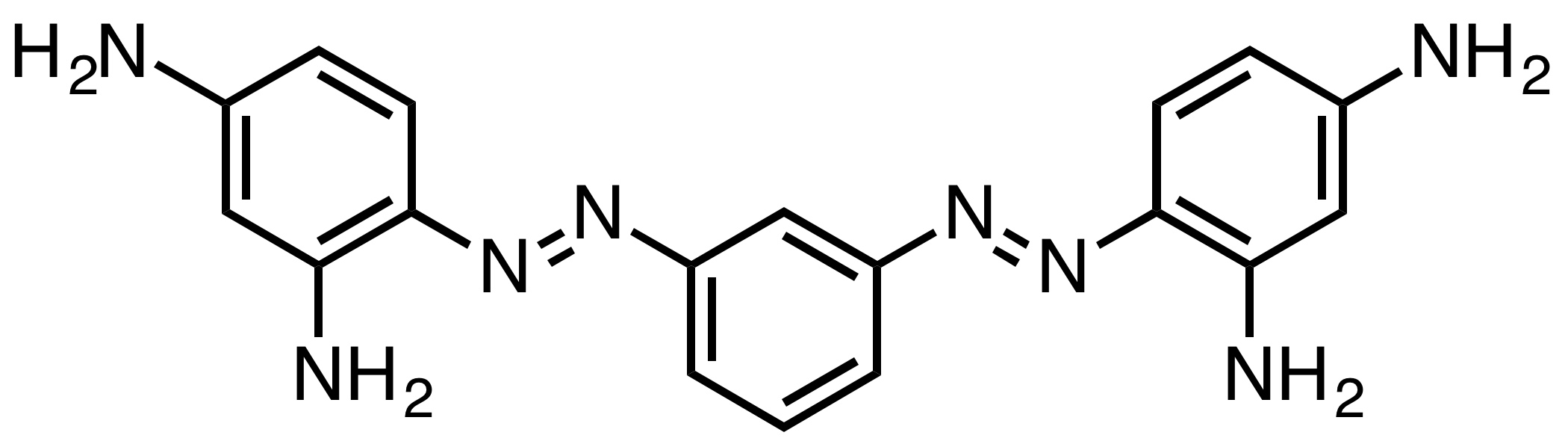

Names
- Other names Bismarck brown Manchester brown Phenylene brown Basic Brown 1 C.I. 21000; Vesuvine BA

Identifiers
CAS Number	8005-77-4
3D model (JSmol)	Interactive image; Interactive image
ChemSpider	13374
ECHA InfoCard	100.030.273
PubChem CID	13981
CompTox Dashboard (EPA)	DTXSID5024558
- InChI: InChI=1S/C18H18N8/c19-11-4-6-17(15(21)8-11)25-23-13-2-1-3-14(10-13)24-26-18-7-5-12(20)9-16(18)22/h1-10H,19-22H2/b25-23+,26-24+ Key: BDFZFGDTHFGWRQ-OGGGYYITSA-N; InChI=1/C18H18N8/c19-11-4-6-17(15(21)8-11)25-23-13-2-1-3-14(10-13)24-26-18-7-5-12(20)9-16(18)22/h1-10H,19-22H2/b25-23+,26-24+ Key: BDFZFGDTHFGWRQ-OGGGYYITBR
- SMILES: CC1=C(C=C(C=C1)N=NC2=C(C=C(C(=C2)C)N)N)N=NC3=C(C=C(C(=C3)C)N)N; N(=N/c1ccc(cc1N)N)\c3cccc(/N=N/c2ccc(N)cc2N)c3

Properties
Chemical formula	C_{18}H_{18}N_{8}·2HCl
Molar mass	419.31 g/mol
- Except where otherwise noted, data are given for materials in their standard state (at 25 °C [77 °F], 100 kPa). verify (what is ?) Infobox references

Bismarck brown Y also called C.I. 21000 and C.I. Basic Brown 1, is a diazo dye with the idealized formula [(H_{2}N)_{2}C_{6}H_{3}N_{2}]_{2}C_{6}H_{4}. The dye is a mixture of closely related compounds. It was one of the earliest azo dyes, being described in 1863 by German chemist Carl Alexander von Martius. Martius named the dye after German chancellor Otto von Bismarck. It is used in histology for staining tissues.

== Synthesis ==
The dye is simple to prepare because the diamine serves both as a source of the diazonium cation and as the coupling partner in the azo coupling reaction. The synthesis is thought to start with double diazotization of 1,3-phenylenediamine:

(H_{2}N)_{2}C_{6}H_{4} + 2 H^{+} + 2 HNO_{2} → [C_{6}H_{4}(N_{2})_{2}]^{2+} + 2 H_{2}O

It is assumed that this bis(diazonium) ion subsequently attacks two equivalents of 1,3-phenylenediamine:

2 (H_{2}N)_{2}C_{6}H_{4} + [C_{6}H_{4}(N_{2})_{2}]^{2+} → 2 H^{+} + [(H_{2}N)_{2}C_{6}H_{3}N_{2}]_{2}C_{6}H_{4}

In some cases, toluenediamines are used in addition to the phenylenediamine. Furthermore, the resulting dye is thought to consist of oligomers with three or more diazo groups.

== Uses ==
Bismarck brown Y stains acid mucins to yellow color. It also stains mast cell granules brown. It can be used with live cells. It is also used to stain cartilage in bone specimens, as one of Kasten's Schiff-type reagents in the periodic acid-Schiff stain to stain cellulose, and in Feulgen stain to stain DNA. It was more common in the past; today it is partially replaced by other stains. It has also been used to give soap an amber color in the past.

Bismarck brown Y is a constituent of Papanicolaou stain.

It can also be used as a counterstain for Victoria blue R for staining of acid-fast microorganisms.
