= Vincent Cochrane =

American mycologist

- Born: August 21, 1916; Plainfield, New Jersey, U.S.
- Died: January 16, 1987 (aged 70)
- Education: Cornell University
- Scientific career
- Workplaces: Wesleyan University

Vincent W. Cochrane (August 21, 1916 – January 16, 1987) was an American mycologist, whose research focused on the biochemistry and physiology of fungi. He is particularly known for his 1958 textbook, The Physiology of the Fungi.

== Early life and education ==
Cochrane was born in 1916, in Plainfield, New Jersey and was brought up in Brooklyn, New York. After working in agriculture, he attended Cornell University's College of Agriculture, gaining a BS in 1939. His PhD, also at Cornell, was in the area of plant pathology, and was supervised by L. M. Massey and A. W. Dimock (1943 or 1944). It focused on common leaf rust, a disease of roses caused by the fungus Phragmidium mucronatum. His thesis appeared in the Cornell Memoir series.

== Research and career ==
After working on penicillin at Lederle Laboratories during the Second World War, Cochrane briefly worked at the Connecticut Agricultural Experiment Station in New Haven (1945–47). In 1947 he joined the Wesleyan University in Middletown, Connecticut, where he spent the remainder of his career, rising to be the Daniel B. Ayres Professor of Biology. He retired in 1982.

His research focused on fungal biochemistry and physiology, particularly fungal metabolism. He investigated basic metabolic pathways in Streptomyces and later studied the sporulation process of Fusarium solani. He was also interested in ecology, and taught a course for non-scientists in the discipline. He wrote a textbook, The Physiology of the Fungi (1958; Wiley).

He was an elected fellow of the American Phytopathological Society (1965) and served as president of the Telluride Association (1947–49).

== Personal life ==
In 1945, he married the bacteriologist Jean Conn, who was the daughter of Harold J. Conn and the granddaughter of Herbert William Conn, both prominent bacteriologists. Jean collaborated in Cochrane's research. They had a daughter Nancy (1948–2017), who worked at the Economic Research Service of the US Department of Agriculture and a son, Bruce, a biology professor and academic administrator, first at the University of South Florida and then at Miami University (Ohio).
