= Harold J. Conn =

American agricultural bacteriologist

- Harold J. Conn in 1948
- Born: May 29, 1886; Middletown, Connecticut
- Died: November 10, 1975 (aged 89)
- Education: Wesleyan University (Ph.D.) Cornell University (Ph.D.)
- Occupation: Agricultural bacteriologist
- Employer: New York State Agricultural Experiment Station
- Known for: Soil microbiology and bacterial staining techniques.
- Notable work: Manual of Methods for Pure Culture Study of Bacteria (1920) Biological Stains (1925) History of Staining (1933; 1948) Staining Procedures (1944–55; 1960) Manual of Microbiological Methods (1957)

Harold Joel Conn (May 29, 1886 – November 10, 1975) was an American agricultural bacteriologist, known for his work on soil microbiology and bacterial staining techniques. He was one of the founders of the Biological Stain Commission and also founded their journal, Stain Technology (now Biotechnic & Histochemistry). He served as president of the Society of American Bacteriologists (now the American Society for Microbiology) in 1948.

== Early life and education ==
Conn was born in Middletown, Connecticut in 1886. His parents were the bacteriologist Herbert William Conn (1859–1917), one of the founders of the Society of American Bacteriologists, and his wife, Julia M. Joel. He had one sister, Bertha. Conn started to experience progressive hearing loss as a child of 12; he describes his father as having encouraged him to overcome the challenges posed by his deafness.

He attended Wesleyan University, where his father had started an early course in bacteriology, gaining a doctorate in 1908, despite being obliged by his deafness to copy another student's lecture notes. He went on to pursue a second PhD in the relatively new discipline of soil bacteriology at the New York State School of Agriculture, Cornell University, under the direction of T. L. Lyon, who specialized in agricultural science rather than bacteriology. He completed this PhD in 1911; his thesis is entitled "A study of seasonal variation among the bacteria in two soil plats of unequal fertility". Conn showed that soil bacteria can sometimes increase when the soil is frozen; the counterintuitive result led to considerable discussion in the scientific community.

== Career, research and societies ==
In 1911, Conn joined the New York State Agricultural Experiment Station in Geneva, New York as an associate bacteriologist. He spent his entire career at the station, which became part of Cornell University, being appointed chief in research in 1920 and, in addition, professor of bacteriology in 1945. He initially worked under H. A. Harding, a dairy bacteriologist, and from 1913 under Robert S. Breed. Conn retired from the station in 1948.

Conn's research at the station continued his PhD investigations on soil bacteria. He invented a technique to stain bacteria so that they could be studied under the light microscope, and from around 1920, staining techniques became his main research focus, to the extent that he was sometimes called "Dr. Stain". In November 1921, he founded the precursor to the American Biological Stain Commission with Rolland T. Will, C. E. McClung, S. I. Kornhauser and L. W. Sharp, and served as one of its founding executive committee members and later its chairman. The commission tested bacteriological and histochemical stains from the fledgling American dye industry, brought into existence by the problems in acquiring stains from Germany after the First World War. From 1922, Conn supervised thirty assistants at the Agricultural Experiment Station in this work.

He served as president of the Society of American Bacteriologists in 1948, and also chaired the society's techniques committee. He was an elected fellow of the American Association for the Advancement of Science.

== Writings and editorial work ==
In 1920, Conn published Manual of Methods for Pure Culture Study of Bacteria, an influential work that was important in devising methods to classify bacteria. In 1923, he published a successful general textbook, Bacteriology; the text had been initiated by his father, who had died in 1917. He edited the Manual of Microbiological Methods (1957) and was a trustee of Bergey's Manual of Determinative Bacteriology (1948–65).

He also published several texts on staining including Biological Stains (1925), History of Staining (1933; 1948) and Staining Procedures (1944–55; 1960). According to the Biological Stain Commission, Biological Stains "has become a standard source of reference in technical and research histopathological and biological laboratories using dyes" and was brought out in a tenth edition in 2002. Conn founded the journal Stain Technology in 1926, serving as its founding editor for nearly 30 years, into his retirement. After his death, the journal's 52nd volume (1977) was dedicated to him.

Conn published more than 200 journal articles, predominantly in the fields of soil microbiology and bacterial staining techniques. He wrote two biographies of his father, Herbert William Conn: one appears in Bacteriological Reviews and deals with the foundation of the Society of American Bacteriologists; the other unpublished text, "A Religious Scientist at the Turn of the Century", includes a bibliography. Other unpublished works include an autobiography and a history of the Biological Stain Commission (1955). His papers are archived at the Division of Rare and Manuscript Collections of Cornell University Library.

== Personal life ==
Conn's hearing loss was progressive throughout his life. Deafness significantly impaired his ability to communicate face to face with other scientists. He was little helped by hearing aids, and also had difficulties with lip reading.

He was married; he and his wife had a son and a daughter, Jean, who also became a bacteriologist and was Conn's long-term assistant. She married the mycologist Vincent W. Cochrane, with whom she collaborated. Conn's wife died in 1963. Conn died in Geneva, New York, in 1975, aged 89.
