= Biological Stain Commission =

The Biological Stain Commission (BSC) is an organization that provides third-party testing and certification of dyes and a few other compounds that are used to enhance contrast in specimens examined in biological and medical laboratories.

The BSC is a century-old organization well known to many thousands of scientists, worldwide but especially in North America, who buy BSC-certified stains for staining microscopic preparations and for making selective culture media for bacteria. Manufacturers and other vendors submit samples from their batches of dyes to the BSC's independent laboratory in Rochester, New York. The BSC's certification label on a bottle of dye indicates that the contents are from a batch that passed the tests for chemical purity and for efficacy as a biological stain. These tests are published (Penney et al. 2002a). Changes to tests and additions to the list of stains eligible for certification are published from time to time in Biotechnic & Histochemistry and are summarized on the commission's web site. A BSC-certified stain rarely costs more than a non-certified one with the same name.

The BSC is a non-profit organization, incorporated in the State of New York, for the purpose of ensuring a supply of high quality stains (mostly dyes) for use in biological and medical laboratories. Its origins date from 1922, when vendors of biological stains in the USA had exhausted their stocks of pre-war dyes imported from Germany. American dye manufacturers at that time were unable to produce products that were consistently reliable in histological microtechnique and bacteriology (Conn 1980–1981; Penney 2000).

The commission's testing laboratory was initially at the Agriculture Experimental Station in Geneva, NY, directed by Harold J. Conn. Since 1947 the laboratory has been located at the University of Rochester Medical College, Rochester, NY. Currently 57 individual dyes and about 5 mixtures of different dyes are eligible for testing and certification by the BSC. The assays and other tests used in the commission's laboratory are all published, making the required standards known to both vendors and users of biological stains (Penney et al. 2002a,b). The commission's web site includes instructions for submitting samples of stains for testing and certification.

Since 1925 the BSC has published a scientific journal, named Stain Technology until 1991, when the name was changed to Biotechnic & Histochemistry. Currently with eight issues per year, the journal carries peer-reviewed papers in a wide range of biological disciplines. These have included studies of many classical and modern staining techniques (see Gray 1954. Kiernan 2015) including results of the BSC's collaborations with academic institutions. In recent years, together with Colour Science Analytical at the University of Leeds, UK, the BSC is trying to identify several dyes sold with the name "alcian blue", none of which are the textile dye that had that name in the 1950s and 1960s (Ali et al 2022).

Biological Stains, a book about the chemistry, testing and applications of dyes and other colorants in biology and medicine, has been published by the BSC since 1925. The first seven editions (1925-1961) were by H. J. Conn. The eighth and ninth editions (1969, 1977), retitled Conn's Biological Stains, were by Ralph Dougall Lillie, who added many dyes and chromogenic reagents and provided extensive tables of data for classification, nomenclature and solubilities of dyes. The tenth and most recent edition of the book (edited by Horobin & Kiernan 2002) has 28 chapters by multiple authors; 18 are by Horobin alone.

The BSC has also sponsored three editions of History of Staining, originally by Conn and later by Clark and Kasten (1983).

Education about stains is another mission of the BSC. Questions sent in by way of the BSC's website are passed on to appropriate experts and answered privately by email, usually within a few days. This free service provides confidential information to users, vendors and manufacturers, and also informs the BSC about current problems.

In December 2018 the BSC added to its website an online glossary of hundreds of words and short phrases used in the field of biological staining. This was revised and enlarged in 2021 and 2023.

The annual meetings of the BSC are usually held on the first or second weekend in June, in cities easily accessible by air from major centers in North America and Europe. These meetings include scientific sessions with presentations by invited speakers in such disciplines as cancer biology, neuroscience, pathology and plant sciences. There are also informal presentations and exchanges of information among academic biologists, medical scientists, pathologists, and representatives of companies that manufacture and sell biological stains. The invited presentations planned for meetings in 2020 and 2021 were postponed because of the Covid-19 pandemic. The 2023 Symposium, held in Rochester NY, marked the Commission's centennial year.
