= Staining =

Technique used to enhance visual contrast of specimens observed under a microscope

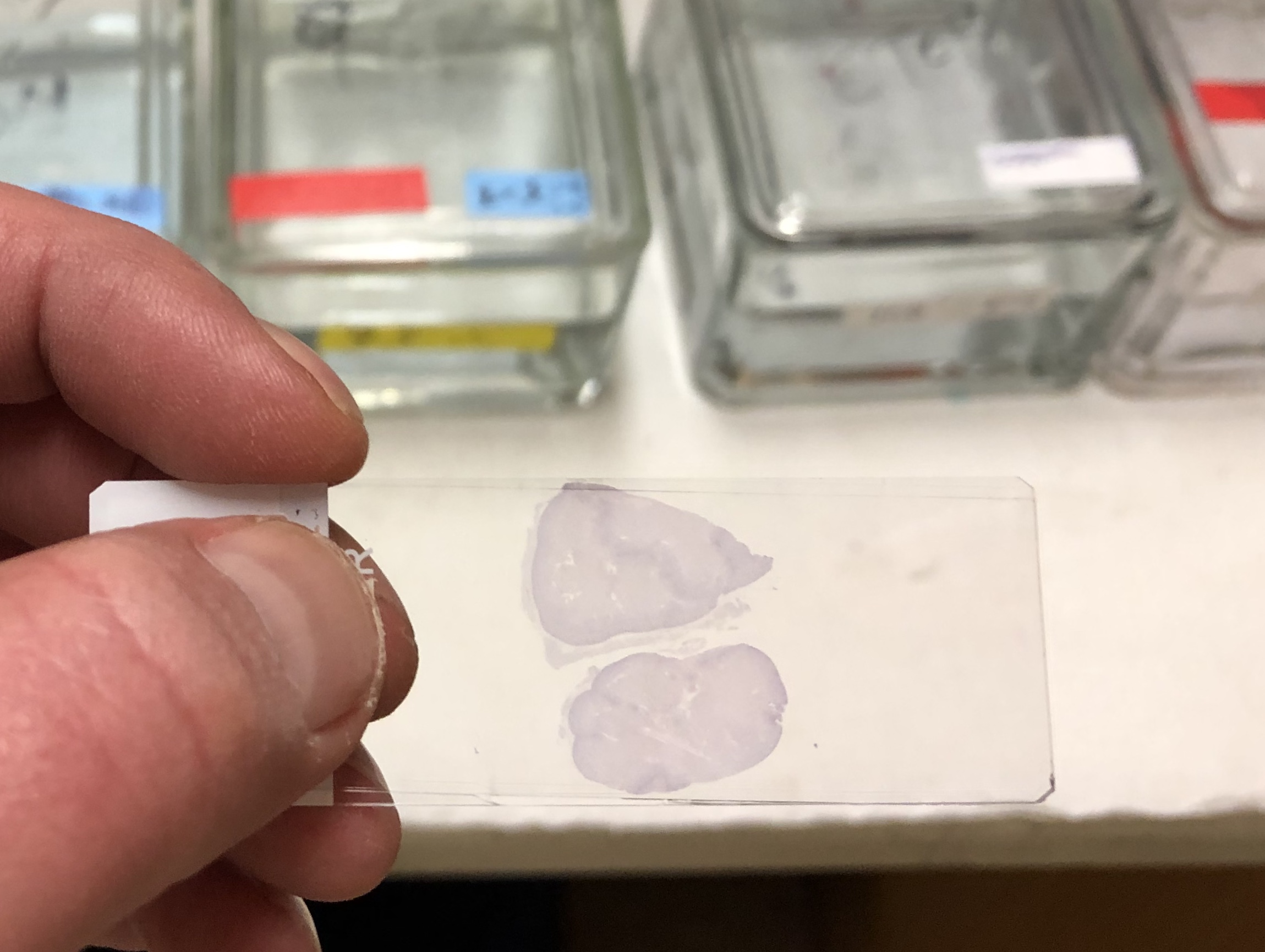
A stained histological specimen, sandwiched between a glass microscope slide.

Staining is a technique used to enhance contrast in samples, generally at the microscopic level. Stains and dyes are frequently used in histology (microscopic study of biological tissues), in cytology (microscopic study of cells), and in the medical fields of histopathology, hematology, and cytopathology that focus on the study and diagnoses of diseases at the microscopic level. Stains may be used to define biological tissues (highlighting, for example, muscle fibers or connective tissue), cell populations (classifying different blood cells), or organelles within individual cells.

In biochemistry, it involves adding a class-specific (DNA, proteins, lipids, carbohydrates) dye to a substrate to qualify or quantify the presence of a specific compound. Staining and fluorescent tagging can serve similar purposes. Biological staining is also used to mark cells in flow cytometry, and to flag proteins or nucleic acids in gel electrophoresis. Light microscopes are used for viewing stained samples at high magnification, typically using bright-field or epi-fluorescence illumination.

Staining is not limited to only biological materials, since it can also be used to study the structure of other materials; for example, the lamellar structures of semi-crystalline polymers or the domain structures of block copolymers.

== In vivo vs In vitro ==
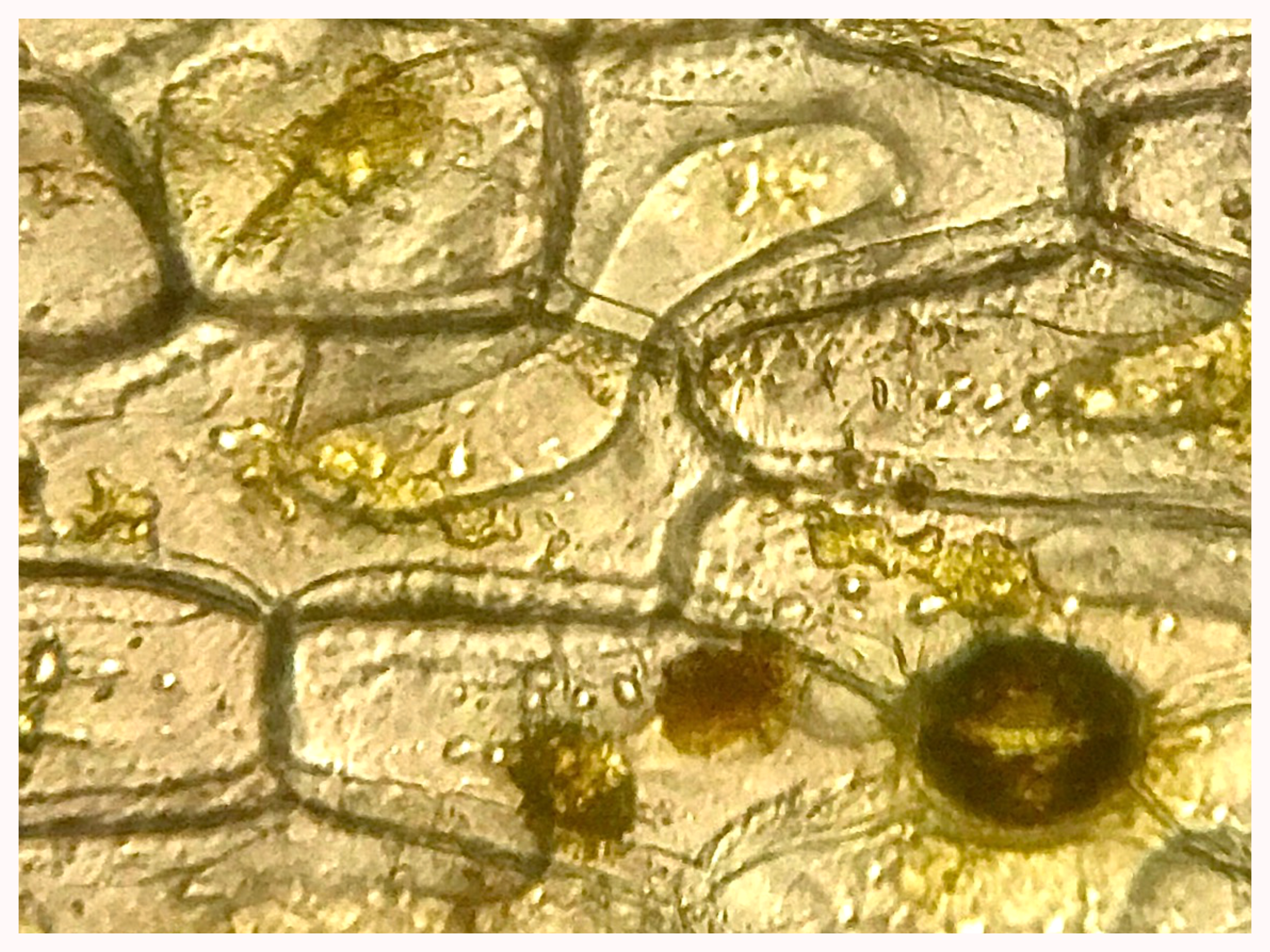
The image is a photomicrograph of the lower epidermis of Aloe vera, viewed under brightfield illumination at 600X magnification. In an attempt to find alternative stains which are less toxic than conventional ones, a stain was prepared by first making a curcumin tincture from turmeric powder, and mixing it with an iodine tincture. The cytoplasms are stained yellow, the nuclei are stained brighter yellow, and the cell wall and guard cells are brown/ochre.

In vivo staining (also called vital staining or intravital staining) is the process of dyeing living tissues. By causing certain cells or structures to take on contrasting colours, their form (morphology) or position within a cell or tissue can be readily seen and studied. The usual purpose is to reveal cytological details that might otherwise not be apparent; however, staining can also reveal where certain chemicals or specific chemical reactions are taking place within cells or tissues.

In vitro staining involves colouring cells or structures that have been removed from their biological context. Certain stains are often combined to reveal more details and features than a single stain alone. Combined with specific protocols for fixation and sample preparation, scientists and physicians can use these standard techniques as consistent, repeatable diagnostic tools. A counterstain is stain that makes cells or structures more visible, when not completely visible with the principal stain.

- Crystal violet stains both Gram positive and Gram negative organisms. Treatment with alcohol removes the crystal violet colour from gram negative organisms only. Safranin as counterstain is used to colour the gram negative organisms that got decolorised by alcohol.

While ex vivo, many cells continue to live and metabolize until they are "fixed". Some staining methods are based on this property. Those stains excluded by the living cells but taken up by the already dead cells are called vital stains (e.g. trypan blue or propidium iodide for eukaryotic cells). Those that enter and stain living cells are called supravital stains (e.g. New Methylene Blue and brilliant cresyl blue for reticulocyte staining). However, these stains are eventually toxic to the organism, some more so than others. Partly due to their toxic interaction inside a living cell, when supravital stains enter a living cell, they might produce a characteristic pattern of staining different from the staining of an already fixed cell (e.g. "reticulocyte" look versus diffuse "polychromasia"). To achieve desired effects, the stains are used in very dilute solutions ranging from 1:5000 to 1:500000 (Howey, 2000). Note that many stains may be used in both living and fixed cells.

== Preparation ==
The preparatory steps involved depend on the type of analysis planned. Some or all of the following procedures may be required.

Wet mounts are used to view live organisms and can be made using water and certain stains. The liquid is added to the slide before the addition of the organism and a coverslip is placed over the specimen in the water and stain to help contain it within the field of view.

Fixation, which may itself consist of several steps, aims to preserve the shape of the cells or tissue involved as much as possible. Sometimes heat fixation is used to kill, adhere, and alter the specimen so it accepts stains. Most chemical fixatives (chemicals causing fixation) generate chemical bonds between proteins and other substances within the sample, increasing their rigidity. Common fixatives include formaldehyde, ethanol, methanol, and/or picric acid. Pieces of tissue may be embedded in paraffin wax to increase their mechanical strength and stability and to make them easier to cut into thin slices.

Mordants are chemical agents which have power of making dyes to stain materials which otherwise are unstainable

Mordants are classified into two categories:

a) Basic mordant: React with acidic dyes e.g. alum, ferrous sulfate, cetylpyridinium chloride etc.

b) Acidic mordant : React with basic dyes e.g. picric acid, tannic acid etc.

Direct Staining: Carried out without mordant.

Indirect Staining: Staining with the aid of a mordant.

Table represents Indirect Staining Techniques and mordants applied in each:
Sr No.	Name of Indirect Staining Technique	Name of mordant applied
1.)	Gram's Staining	Gram's iodine
2.)	Cell Wall Staining a.) Ringer's method b.) Dyar's method	10% Tannic acid 0.34% C.P.C
3.)	Flagella Staining a.) Leifson's method b.) Loeffler's method	Tannic acid in Leifson's stain Loeffler's mordant (20%Tannic acid )
4.)	Spirochete Staining a.) Fontana's method b.) Becker's method	Fontana's mordant(5%Tannic acid) Fontana's mordant(5%Tannic acid)

Permeabilization involves treatment of cells with (usually) a mild surfactant. This treatment dissolves cell membranes, and allows larger dye molecules into the cell's interior.

Mounting usually involves attaching the samples to a glass microscope slide for observation and analysis. In some cases, cells may be grown directly on a slide. For samples of loose cells (as with a blood smear or a pap smear) the sample can be directly applied to a slide. For larger pieces of tissue, thin sections (slices) are made using a microtome; these slices can then be mounted and inspected.

=== Standardization ===
Most of the dyes commonly used in microscopy are available as BSC-certified stains. This means that samples of the manufacturer's batch have been tested by an independent body, the Biological Stain Commission (BSC), and found to meet or exceed certain standards of purity, dye content and performance in staining techniques ensuring more accurately performed experiments and more reliable results. These standards are published in the commission's journal Biotechnic & Histochemistry. Many dyes are inconsistent in composition from one supplier to another. The use of BSC-certified stains eliminates a source of unexpected results.

Some vendors sell stains "certified" by themselves rather than by the Biological Stain Commission. Such products may or may not be suitable for diagnostic and other applications.

=== Negative staining ===
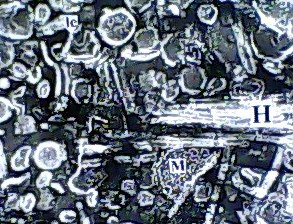
Example of negative staining

A simple staining method for bacteria that is usually successful, even when the positive staining methods fail, is to use a negative stain. This can be achieved by smearing the sample onto the slide and then applying nigrosin (a black synthetic dye) or India ink (an aqueous suspension of carbon particles). After drying, the microorganisms may be viewed in bright field microscopy as lighter inclusions well-contrasted against the dark environment surrounding them. Negative staining is able to stain the background instead of the organisms because the cell wall of microorganisms typically has a negative charge which repels the negatively charged stain. The dyes used in negative staining are acidic. Note: negative staining is a mild technique that may not destroy the microorganisms, and is therefore unsuitable for studying pathogens.

=== Positive staining ===
Unlike negative staining, positive staining uses basic dyes to color the specimen against a bright background. While chromophore is used for both negative and positive staining alike, the type of chromophore used in this technique is a positively charged ion instead of a negative one. The negatively charged cell wall of many microorganisms attracts the positively charged chromophore which causes the specimen to absorb the stain giving it the color of the stain being used. Positive staining is more commonly used than negative staining in microbiology. The different types of positive staining are listed below.

=== Simple versus differential ===
Simple Staining is a technique that only uses one type of stain on a slide at a time. Because only one stain is being used, the specimens (for positive stains) or background (for negative stains) will be one color. Therefore, simple stains are typically used for viewing only one organism per slide. Differential staining uses multiple stains per slide. Based on the stains being used, organisms with different properties will appear different colors allowing for categorization of multiple specimens. Differential staining can also be used to color different organelles within one organism which can be seen in endospore staining.

=== Types ===
Types of staining techniques
Sr. No.	Staining Technique	Preparation	Application	Result
1.	Simple (Monochrome)	Smear stain with single dye . e.g. Methylene blue, Safranin°≤×←→ etc.	Used to highlight microbes and illustrate cellular shapes and arrangements	Organisms are stained in the color of applied stain
2.	Negative (Relief)	Smear mixed with Nigrosin and spread into thin film	Study cell morphology	Organism is stained, the background is black
3	Gram	Primary stain: Crystal violet applied to film then treated with iodine (mordant), alcohol (decolourizer) and counter stained with safranin	Characterizes bacteria in one of two groups, Gram positive or Gram negative	Gram positive appears purple in color Gram negative appears pink in color
4	Acid fast (Ziehl-Neelsen technique)	Film stained with hot Z.N.C.F. decolourised (acid-alcohol) and counter stain with methylene blue	Separate non-decolorized acid fast bacteria that are not decolorized from colorized non-acid fast bacteria	Acid fast bacteria:Red Non acid fast: Blue
5	Endospore (Dornor's method)	Primary stain Malachite green heat fixed to penetrate spores; vegetative cells are counterstained with Safranin	Detects the presence of endospores in six genera of bacteria	Endospores: Green Vegetative cells: Red
6	Capsule A: Hiss method (Positive technique) B: Manevals's technique (Negative)	Smear stained with Hiss stain following treatment with copper sulphate Bacterial suspension smeared along with Congo red and the Maneval's stain is applied	Capsules can be observed as clear zones surrounding cells of capsulated bacteria and are used to demonstrate the presence of capsules.	Capsule: Light violet/pale mauve color Bacteria: Purple capsule, bacterial cell, stands out against dark background
7	Cell wall (Dyar's method)	Smear treated with C.P.C. which dissociates to form positively charged cetyl pyridinium and negatively charged chloride ions. Positively charged ions are adsorbed on negatively charged cell wall	Stains cell wall of bacterium	Cell wall: Red Cytoplasm: Blue
8	Flagella (Leifson's method)	Mordant acts to thicken flagella before staining and increases visibility microscopically when stained with Leifson stain	Demonstrates presence of flagella	Flagella: Red Vegetative cells: Blue
9	Nuclear material (Feulgen technique)	Smear is treated for hydrolysis to release purines from DNA, purines to cause shift form furanose to aldehyde. Aldehyde groups are available to react with schiff's reagent to form addition compounds.	To demonstrate the presence of DNA in cell. But for detection of the DNA, RNA should be selectively destroyed by acid hydrolysis without affecting DNA	Nuclear material- pinkish purple, Cytoplasm- colorless
10	Metachromatic granules (Alberts's method)	The smear is first treated with chloroform to remove fats . Smear applied with Alberts stain which contains cationic dyes such as toluidine blue and malachite green. Toluidine blue preferentially stains granules while malachite green stains cytoplasm.	The granules show the typical monochromatism nature, this is used to demonstrate granules	Granules: Bluish black, Cytoplasm: Green
11	Intracellular lipids (Burdon's method)	Lipids are stained with fat soluble dyes like Sudan black. On application of Sudan black-B dyes move into lipids and are retained there while cytoplasm is counter stained with safranin.	To detect the presence of lipids in cell wall, cell membrane or fat globules (PHB in cytoplasm)	Lipid granules: Deep blue, Cytoplasm: Light pink
12	Polysaccharide (Hotch kuss method)	Polysaccharide is oxidized with periodate to form polyaldehyde which reacts with Schiff's reagents to red color, while cytoplasm is counter stained with malachite green	Detects the accumulation of polysaccharide granules in the cells	Polysaccharide: Red Cytoplasm: Green

== Techniques ==
=== Gram ===
Gram staining is used to determine gram status to classifying bacteria broadly based on the composition of their cell wall. Gram staining uses crystal violet to stain cell walls, iodine (as a mordant), and a fuchsin or safranin counterstain to (mark all bacteria). Gram status, helps divide specimens of bacteria into two groups, generally representative of their underlying phylogeny. This characteristic, in combination with other techniques makes it a useful tool in clinical microbiology laboratories, where it can be important in early selection of appropriate antibiotics.

On most Gram-stained preparations, Gram-negative organisms appear red or pink due to their counterstain. Due to the presence of higher lipid content, after alcohol-treatment, the porosity of the cell wall increases, hence the CVI complex (crystal violet – iodine) can pass through. Thus, the primary stain is not retained. In addition, in contrast to most Gram-positive bacteria, Gram-negative bacteria have only a few layers of peptidoglycan and a secondary cell membrane made primarily of lipopolysaccharide.

=== Endospore ===
Endospore staining is used to identify the presence or absence of endospores, which make bacteria very difficult to kill. Bacterial spores have proven to be difficult to stain as they are not permeable to aqueous dye reagents. Endospore staining is particularly useful for identifying endospore-forming bacterial pathogens such as Clostridioides difficile. Prior to the development of more efficient methods, this stain was performed using the Wirtz method with heat fixation and counterstain. Through the use of malachite green and a diluted ratio of carbol fuchsin, fixing bacteria in osmic acid was a great way to ensure no blending of dyes. However, newly revised staining methods have significantly decreased the time it takes to create these stains. This revision included substitution of carbol fuchsin with aqueous Safranin paired with a newly diluted 5% formula of malachite green. This new and improved composition of stains was performed in the same way as before with the use of heat fixation, rinsing, and blotting dry for later examination. Upon examination, all endospore forming bacteria will be stained green accompanied by all other cells appearing red.

=== Ziehl-Neelsen ===
A Ziehl–Neelsen stain is an acid-fast stain used to stain species of Mycobacterium tuberculosis that do not stain with the standard laboratory staining procedures such as Gram staining.

This stain is performed through the use of both red coloured carbol fuchsin that stains the bacteria and a counter stain such as methylene blue.

=== Haematoxylin and eosin (H&E) ===
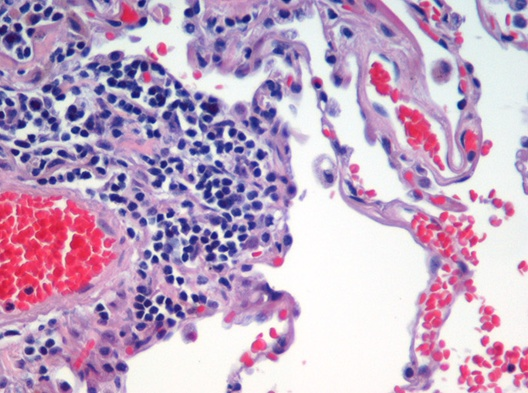
Microscopic view of a histologic specimen of human lung tissue stained with hematoxylin and eosin.

Haematoxylin and eosin staining is frequently used in histology to examine thin tissue sections. Haematoxylin stains cell nuclei blue, while eosin stains cytoplasm, connective tissue and other extracellular substances pink or red. Eosin is strongly absorbed by red blood cells, colouring them bright red. In a skillfully made H&E preparation the red blood cells are almost orange, and collagen and cytoplasm (especially muscle) acquire different shades of pink.

=== Papanicolaou ===
Papanicolaou staining, or PAP staining, was developed to replace fine needle aspiration cytology (FNAC) in hopes of decreasing staining times and cost without compromising quality. This stain is a frequently used method for examining cell samples from a variety of tissue types in various organs. PAP staining has endured several modifications in order to become a “suitable alternative” for FNAC. This transition stemmed from the appreciation of wet fixed smears by scientists preserving the structures of the nuclei opposed to the opaque appearance of air dried Romanowsky smears. This led to the creation of a hybrid stain of wet fixed and air dried known as the ultrafast papanicolaou stain. This modification includes the use of nasal saline to rehydrate cells to increase cell transparency and is paired with the use of alcoholic formalin to enhance colors of the nuclei. The papanicolaou stain is now used in place of cytological staining in all organ types due to its increase in morphological quality, decreased staining time, and decreased cost. It is frequently used to stain Pap smear specimens. It uses a combination of haematoxylin, Orange G, eosin Y, Light Green SF yellowish, and sometimes Bismarck Brown Y.

=== PAS ===
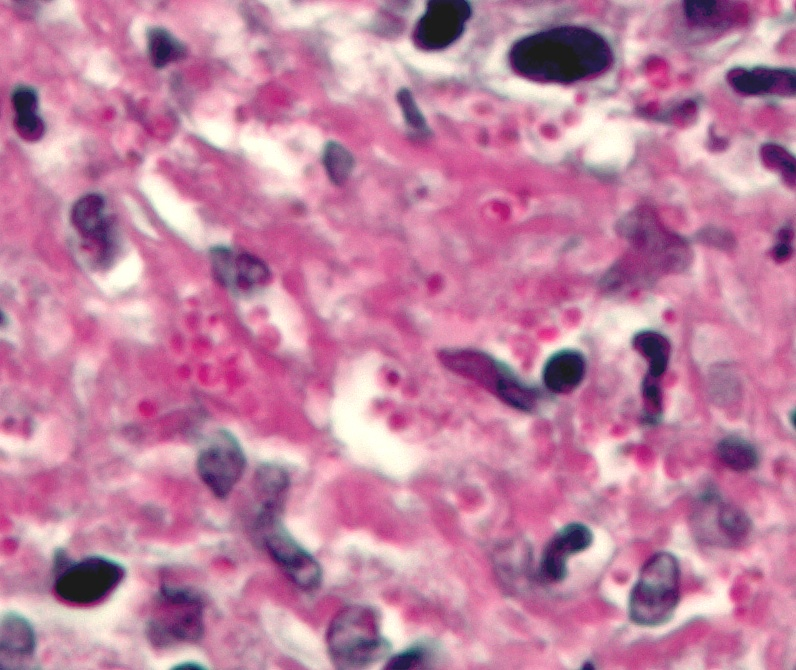
PAS diastase showing the fungus Histoplasma.

Periodic acid-Schiff is a histology special stain used to mark carbohydrates (glycogen, glycoprotein, proteoglycans). PAS is commonly used on liver tissue where glycogen deposits are made which is done in efforts to distinguish different types of glycogen storage diseases. PAS is important because it can detect glycogen granules found in tumors of the ovaries and pancreas of the endocrine system, as well as in the bladder and kidneys of the renal system. Basement membranes can also show up in a PAS stain and can be important when diagnosing renal disease. Due to the high volume of carbohydrates within the cell wall of hyphae and yeast forms of fungi, the Periodic acid -Schiff stain can help locate these species inside tissue samples of the human body.

=== Masson ===
Masson's trichrome is (as the name implies) a three-colour staining protocol. The recipe has evolved from Masson's original technique for different specific applications, but all are well-suited to distinguish cells from surrounding connective tissue. Most recipes produce red keratin and muscle fibers, blue or green staining of collagen and bone, light red or pink staining of cytoplasm, and black cell nuclei.

=== Romanowsky ===
The Romanowsky stains is considered a polychrome staining effect and is based on a combination of eosin plus (chemically reduced eosin) and demethylated methylene blue (containing its oxidation products azure A and azure B). This stain develops varying colors for all cell structures (“Romanowsky-Giemsa effect) and thus was used in staining neutrophil polymorphs and cell nuclei. Common variants include Wright's stain, Jenner's stain, May-Grunwald stain, Leishman stain and Giemsa stain.

All are used to examine blood or bone marrow samples. They are preferred over H&E for inspection of blood cells because different types of leukocytes (white blood cells) can be readily distinguished. All are also suited to examination of blood to detect blood-borne parasites such as malaria.

=== Silver ===
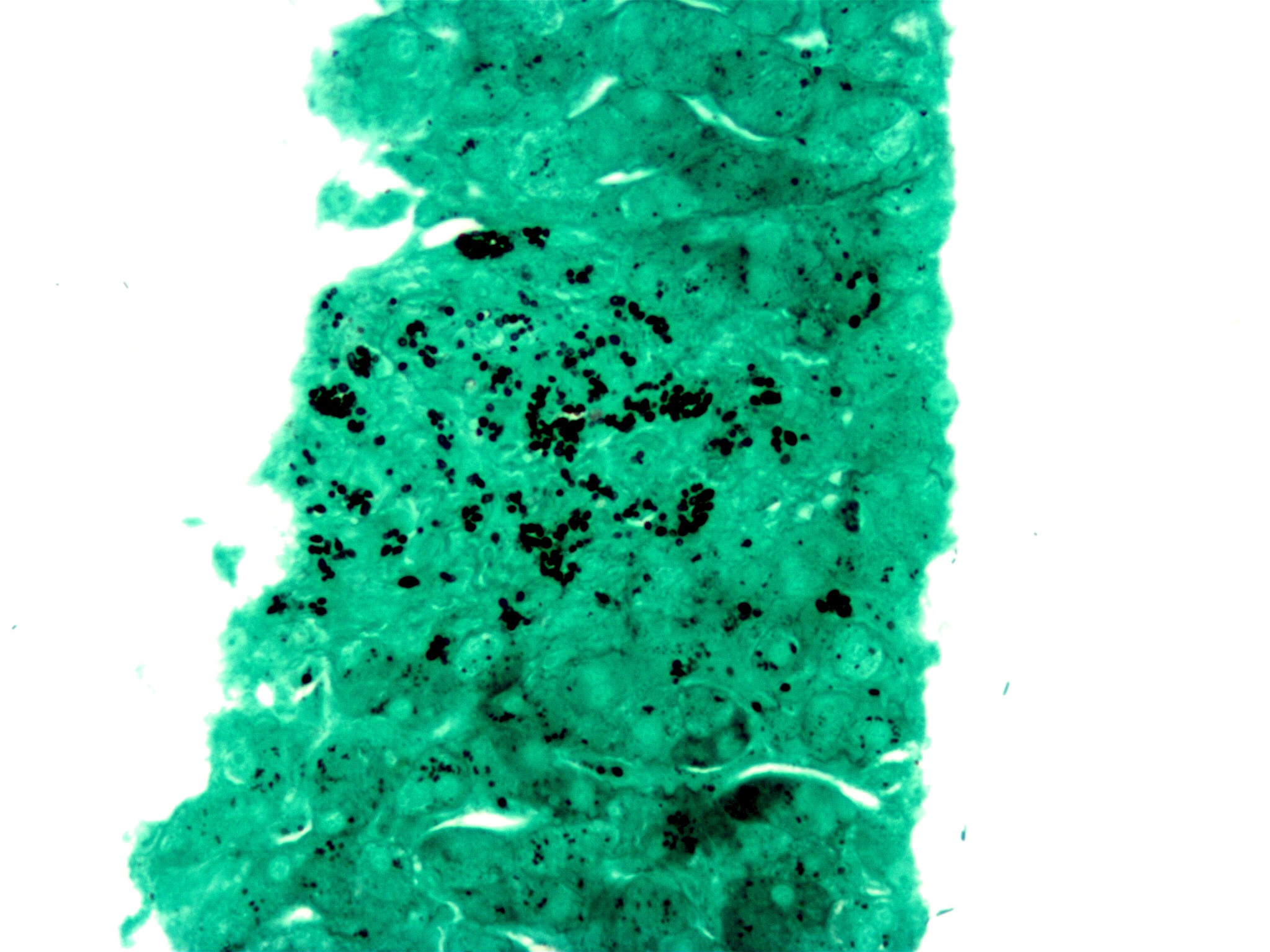
Gömöri methenamine silver stain demonstrating histoplasma (illustrated in black).

Silver staining is the use of silver to stain histologic sections. This kind of staining is important in the demonstration of proteins (for example type III collagen) and DNA. It is used to show both substances inside and outside cells. Silver staining is also used in temperature gradient gel electrophoresis.

Argentaffin cells reduce silver solution to metallic silver after formalin fixation. This method was discovered by Italian Camillo Golgi, by using a reaction between silver nitrate and potassium dichromate, thus precipitating silver chromate in some cells (see Golgi's method). Argyrophilic cells reduce silver solution to metallic silver after being exposed to the stain that contains a reductant. An example of this would be hydroquinone or formalin.

=== Sudan ===
Sudan staining utilizes Sudan dyes to stain sudanophilic substances, often including lipids. Sudan III, Sudan IV, Oil Red O, Osmium tetroxide, and Sudan Black B are often used. Sudan staining is often used to determine the level of fecal fat in diagnosing steatorrhea.

=== Wirtz-Conklin ===
The Wirtz-Conklin stain is a special technique designed for staining true endospores with the use of malachite green dye as the primary stain and safranin as the counterstain. Once stained, they do not decolourize. The addition of heat during the staining process is a huge contributing factor. Heat helps open the spore's membrane so the dye can enter. The main purpose of this stain is to show germination of bacterial spores. If the process of germination is taking place, then the spore will turn green in color due to malachite green and the surrounding cell will be red from the safranin. This stain can also help determine the orientation of the spore within the bacterial cell; whether it being terminal (at the tip), subterminal (within the cell), or central (completely in the middle of the cell).

=== Collagen hybridizing peptide ===
Collagen hybridizing peptide (CHP) staining allows for an easy, direct way to stain denatured collagens of any type (Type I, II, IV, etc.) regardless if they were damaged or degraded via enzymatic, mechanical, chemical, or thermal means. They work by refolding into the collagen triple helix with the available single strands in the tissue. CHPs can be visualized by a simple fluorescence microscope.

== Common biological stains ==
Different stains react or concentrate in different parts of a cell or tissue, and these properties are used to advantage to reveal specific parts or areas. Some of the most common biological stains are listed below. Unless otherwise marked, all of these dyes may be used with fixed cells and tissues; vital dyes (suitable for use with living organisms) are noted.

=== Acridine orange ===
Acridine orange (AO) is a nucleic acid selective fluorescent cationic dye useful for cell cycle determination. It is cell-permeable, and interacts with DNA and RNA by intercalation or electrostatic attractions. When bound to DNA, it is very similar spectrally to fluorescein. Like fluorescein, it is also useful as a non-specific stain for backlighting conventionally stained cells on the surface of a solid sample of tissue (fluorescence backlighted staining).

=== Bismarck brown ===
Bismarck brown (also Bismarck brown Y or Manchester brown) imparts a yellow colour to acid mucins and an intense brown color to mast cells. One default of this stain is that it blots out any other structure surrounding it and makes the quality of the contrast low. It has to be paired with other stains in order to be useful. Some complementing stains used alongside Bismark brown are Hematoxylin and Toluidine blue which provide better contrast within the histology sample.

=== Carmine ===
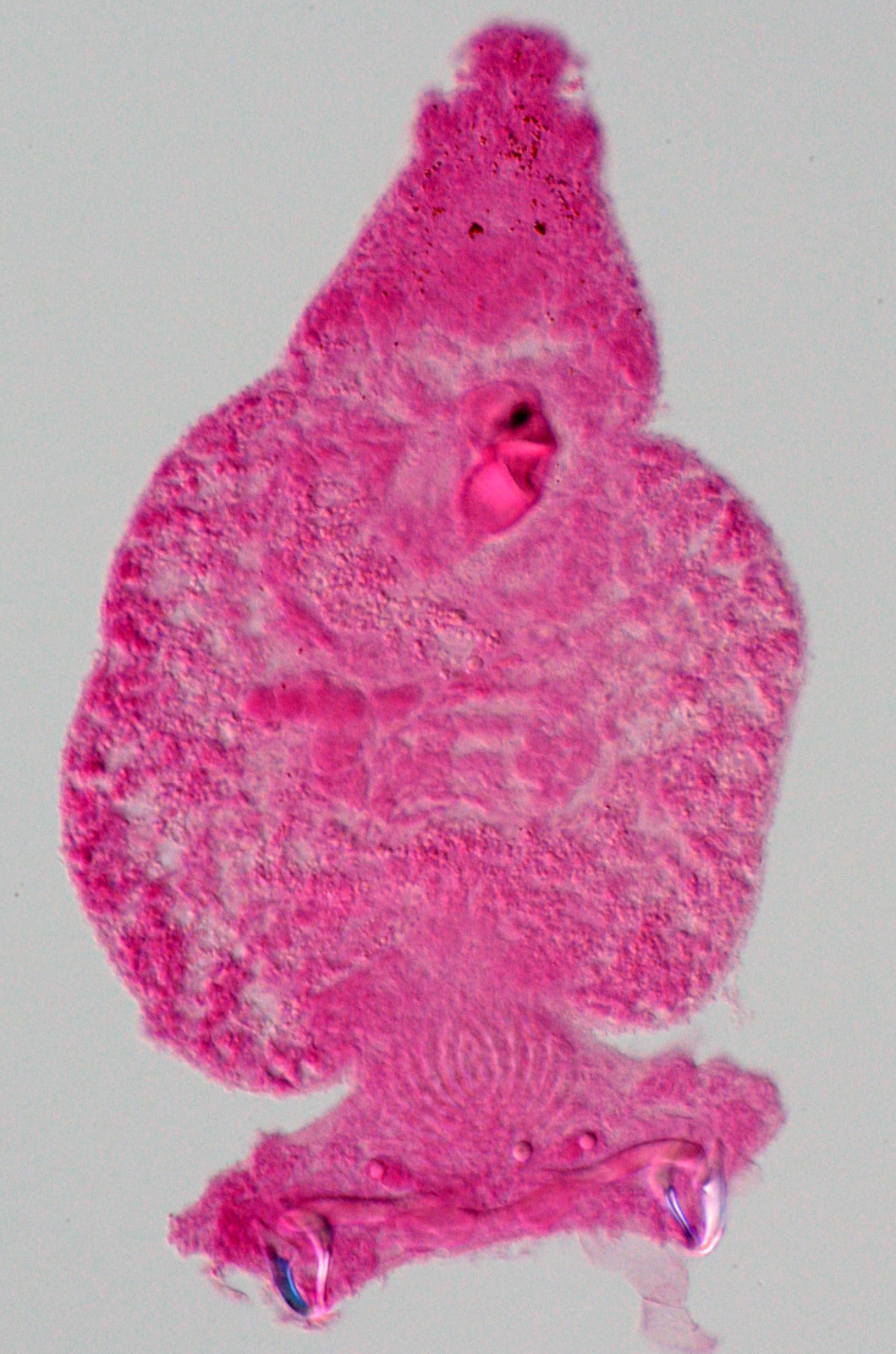
Carmine staining of a parasitic flatworm.

Carmine is an intensely red dye used to stain glycogen, while Carmine alum is a nuclear stain. Carmine stains require the use of a mordant, usually aluminum.

=== Coomassie blue ===
Coomassie brilliant blue nonspecifically stains proteins a strong blue colour. It is often used in gel electrophoresis.

=== Cresyl violet ===
Cresyl violet stains the acidic components of the neuronal cytoplasm a violet colour, specifically nissl bodies. Often used in brain research.

=== Crystal violet ===
Crystal violet, when combined with a suitable mordant, stains cell walls purple. Crystal violet is the stain used in Gram staining.

=== DAPI ===
DAPI is a fluorescent nuclear stain, excited by ultraviolet light and showing strong blue fluorescence when bound to DNA. DAPI binds with A=T rich repeats of chromosomes. DAPI is also not visible with regular transmission microscopy. It may be used in living or fixed cells. DAPI-stained cells are especially appropriate for cell counting.

=== Eosin ===
Eosin is most often used as a counterstain to haematoxylin, imparting a pink or red colour to cytoplasmic material, cell membranes, and some extracellular structures. It also imparts a strong red colour to red blood cells. Eosin may also be used as a counterstain in some variants of Gram staining, and in many other protocols. There are actually two very closely related compounds commonly referred to as eosin. Most often used is eosin Y (also known as eosin Y ws or eosin yellowish); it has a very slightly yellowish cast. The other eosin compound is eosin B (eosin bluish or imperial red); it has a very faint bluish cast. The two dyes are interchangeable, and the use of one or the other is more a matter of preference and tradition.

=== Ethidium bromide ===
Ethidium bromide intercalates and stains DNA, providing a fluorescent red-orange stain. Although it will not stain healthy cells, it can be used to identify cells that are in the final stages of apoptosis – such cells have much more permeable membranes. Consequently, ethidium bromide is often used as a marker for apoptosis in cells populations and to locate bands of DNA in gel electrophoresis. The stain may also be used in conjunction with acridine orange (AO) in viable cell counting. This EB/AO combined stain causes live cells to fluoresce green whilst apoptotic cells retain the distinctive red-orange fluorescence.

=== Acid fuchsin ===
Acid fuchsine may be used to stain collagen, smooth muscle, or mitochondria. Acid fuchsin is used as the nuclear and cytoplasmic stain in Mallory's trichrome method. Acid fuchsin stains cytoplasm in some variants of Masson's trichrome. In Van Gieson's picro-fuchsine, acid fuchsin imparts its red colour to collagen fibres. Acid fuchsin is also a traditional stain for mitochondria (Altmann's method).

=== Haematoxylin ===
Haematoxylin (hematoxylin in North America) is a nuclear stain. Used with a mordant, haematoxylin stains nuclei blue-violet or brown. It is most often used with eosin in the H&E stain (haematoxylin and eosin) staining, one of the most common procedures in histology.

=== Hoechst stains ===
Hoechst is a bis-benzimidazole derivative compound that binds to the minor groove of DNA. Often used in fluorescence microscopy for DNA staining, Hoechst stains appear yellow when dissolved in aqueous solutions and emit blue light under UV excitation. There are two major types of Hoechst: Hoechst 33258 and Hoechst 33342. The two compounds are functionally similar, but with a little difference in structure. Hoechst 33258 contains a terminal hydroxyl group and is thus more soluble in aqueous solution, however this characteristics reduces its ability to penetrate the plasma membrane. Hoechst 33342 contains an ethyl substitution on the terminal hydroxyl group (i.e. an ethylether group) making it more hydrophobic for easier plasma membrane passage

=== Iodine ===
Iodine is used in chemistry as an indicator for starch. When starch is mixed with iodine in solution, an intensely dark blue colour develops, representing a starch/iodine complex. Starch is a substance common to most plant cells and so a weak iodine solution will stain starch present in the cells. Iodine is one component in the staining technique known as Gram staining, used in microbiology. Used as a mordant in Gram's staining, iodine enhances the entrance of the dye through the pores present in the cell wall/membrane.

Lugol's solution or Lugol's iodine (IKI) is a brown solution that turns black in the presence of starches and can be used as a cell stain, making the cell nuclei more visible.

Used with common vinegar (acetic acid), Lugol's solution is used to identify pre-cancerous and cancerous changes in cervical and vaginal tissues during "Pap smear" follow up examinations in preparation for biopsy. The acetic acid causes the abnormal cells to blanch white, while the normal tissues stain a mahogany brown from the iodine.

=== Malachite green ===
Malachite green (also known as diamond green B or victoria green B) can be used as a blue-green counterstain to safranin in the Gimenez staining technique for bacteria. It can also be used to directly stain spores.

=== Methyl green ===
Methyl green is used commonly with bright-field, as well as fluorescence microscopes to dye the chromatin of cells so that they are more easily viewed.

=== Methylene blue ===
Methylene blue is used to stain animal cells, such as human cheek cells, to make their nuclei more observable. Also used to stain blood films in cytology.

=== Neutral red ===
Neutral red (or toluylene red) stains Nissl substance red. It is usually used as a counterstain in combination with other dyes.

=== Nile blue ===
Nile blue (or Nile blue A) stains nuclei blue. It may be used with living cells.

=== Nile red ===
Nile red (also known as Nile blue oxazone) is formed by boiling Nile blue with sulfuric acid. This produces a mix of Nile red and Nile blue. Nile red is a lipophilic stain; it will accumulate in lipid globules inside cells, staining them red. Nile red can be used with living cells. It fluoresces strongly when partitioned into lipids, but practically not at all in aqueous solution.

=== Osmium tetroxide (formal name: osmium tetraoxide) ===
Osmium tetraoxide is used in optical microscopy to stain lipids. It dissolves in fats, and is reduced by organic materials to elemental osmium, an easily visible black substance.

=== Propidium iodide ===
Propidium iodide is a fluorescent intercalating agent that can be used to stain cells. Propidium iodide is used as a DNA stain in flow cytometry to evaluate cell viability or DNA content in cell cycle analysis, or in microscopy to visualise the nucleus and other DNA-containing organelles. Propidium Iodide cannot cross the membrane of live cells, making it useful to differentiate necrotic, apoptotic and healthy cells. PI also binds to RNA, necessitating treatment with nucleases to distinguish between RNA and DNA staining

=== Rhodamine ===
Rhodamine is a protein specific fluorescent stain commonly used in fluorescence microscopy.

=== Safranine ===
Safranine (or Safranine O) is a red cationic dye. It binds to nuclei (DNA) and other tissue polyanions, including glycosaminoglycans in cartilage and mast cells, and components of lignin and plastids in plant tissues. Safranine should not be confused with saffron, an expensive natural dye that is used in some methods to impart a yellow colour to collagen, to contrast with blue and red colours imparted by other dyes to nuclei and cytoplasm in animal (including human) tissues.

The incorrect spelling "safranin" is in common use. The -ine ending is appropriate for safranine O because this dye is an amine.

=== Thiazole-Orange-Based DNA Dyes ===
Thiazole Orange derivatives, such as SYBR Safe, SYBR Green, SYBR Gold, Pico Green, SYTO-16, SYTO-9 and TOPhBu are special cyanine dyes commonly used as fluorescent DNA sensors. The ability of the dyes to detect DNA at low concentrations was evaluated using two metrics: absolute fluorescence enhancement (AFE) and relative fluorescence enhancement (RFE).

== Alternative Stains ==
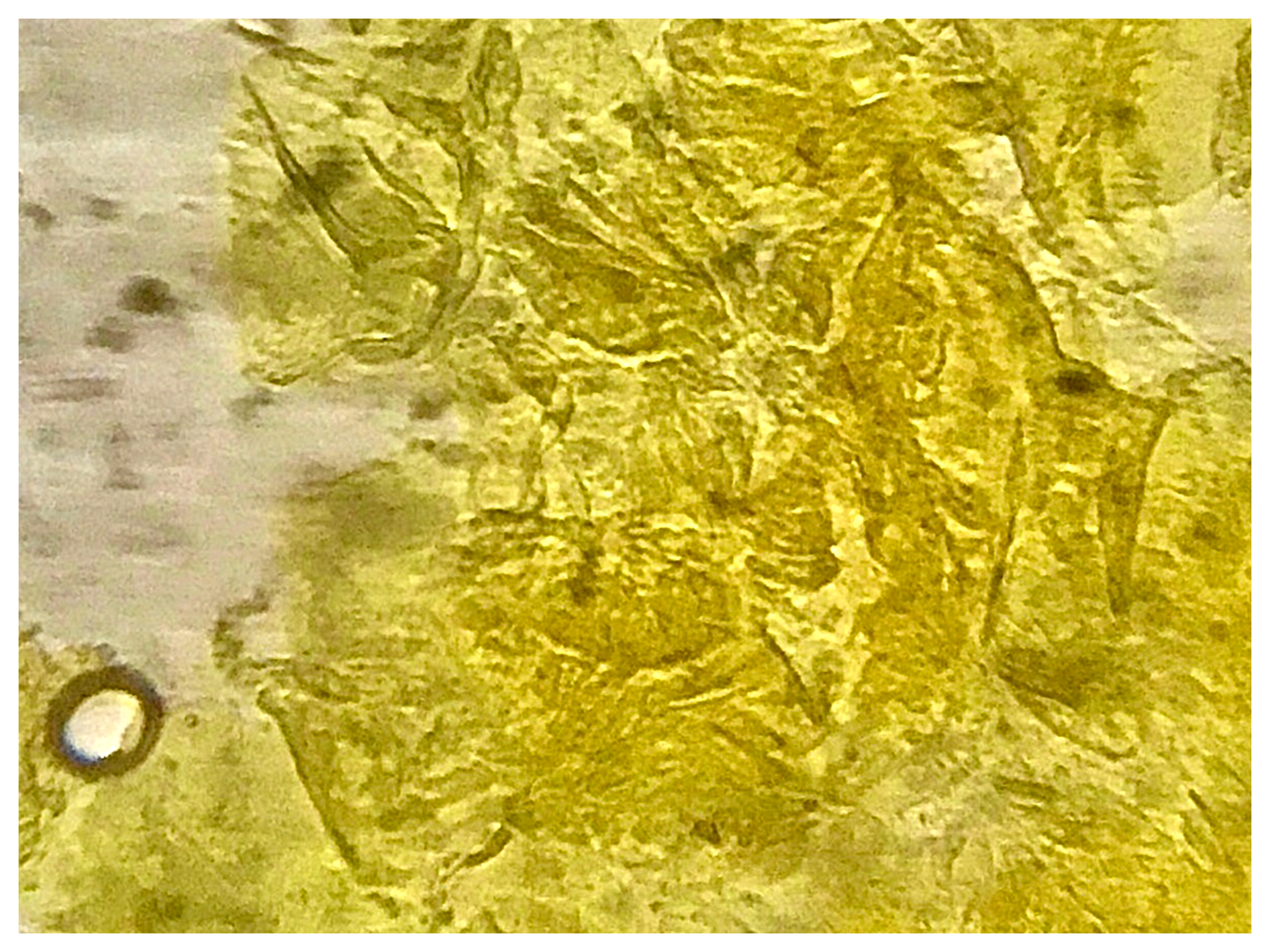
Human cheek epithelium stained using a curcumin tincture (made by dissolving turmeric powder in absolute ethanol, centrifuging and then filtering).

Due to concerns over the toxicity and environmental hazards of conventional microscopy stains, some are seeking alternative, more sustainable stains. Extracts from Curcuma longa (the source of turmeric), Beta vulgaris (beetroot), and Lawsonia inermis (henna) are being actively considered and researched for their staining properties.

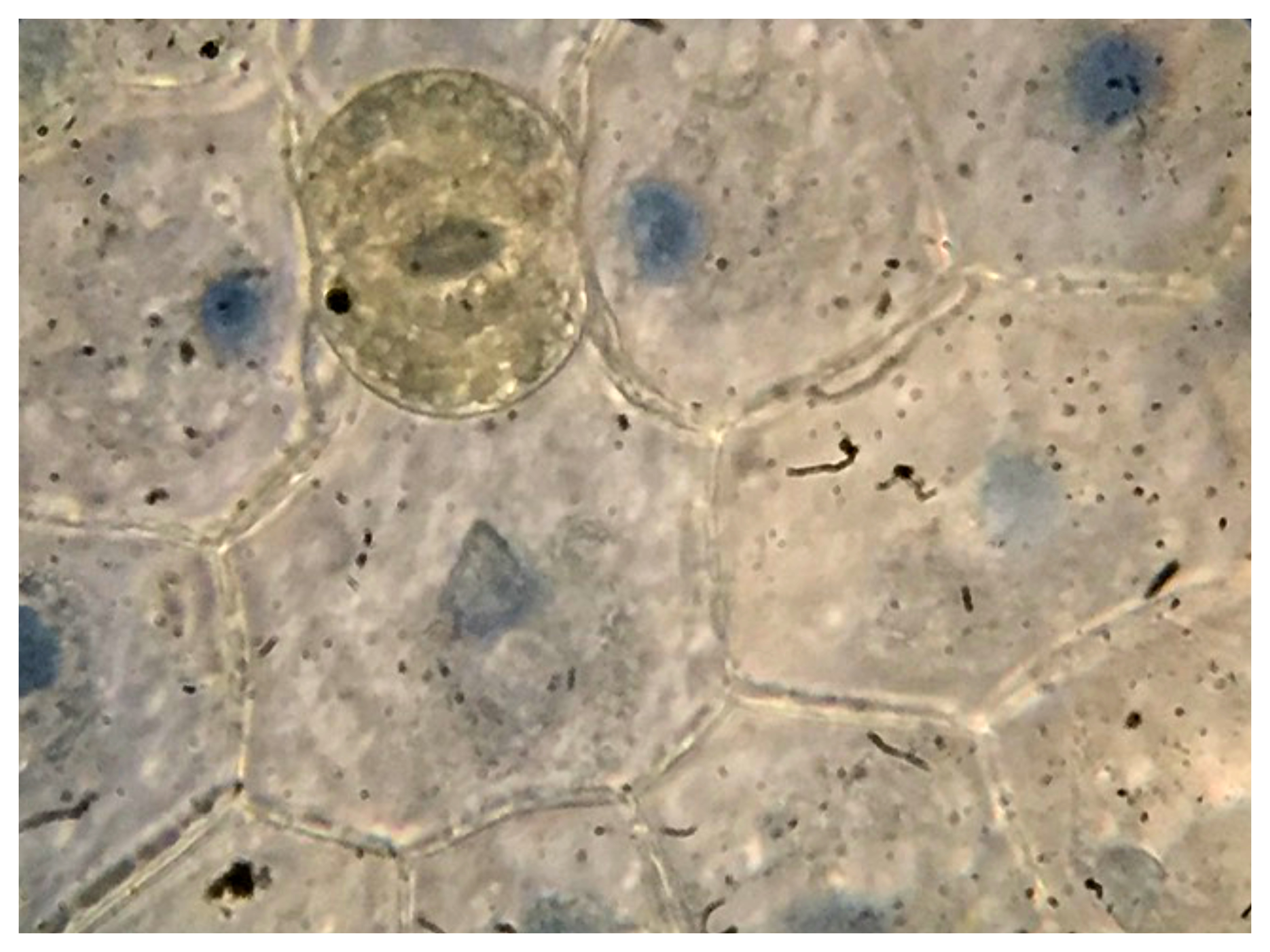
Aloe vera sample stained using black fountain pen ink.

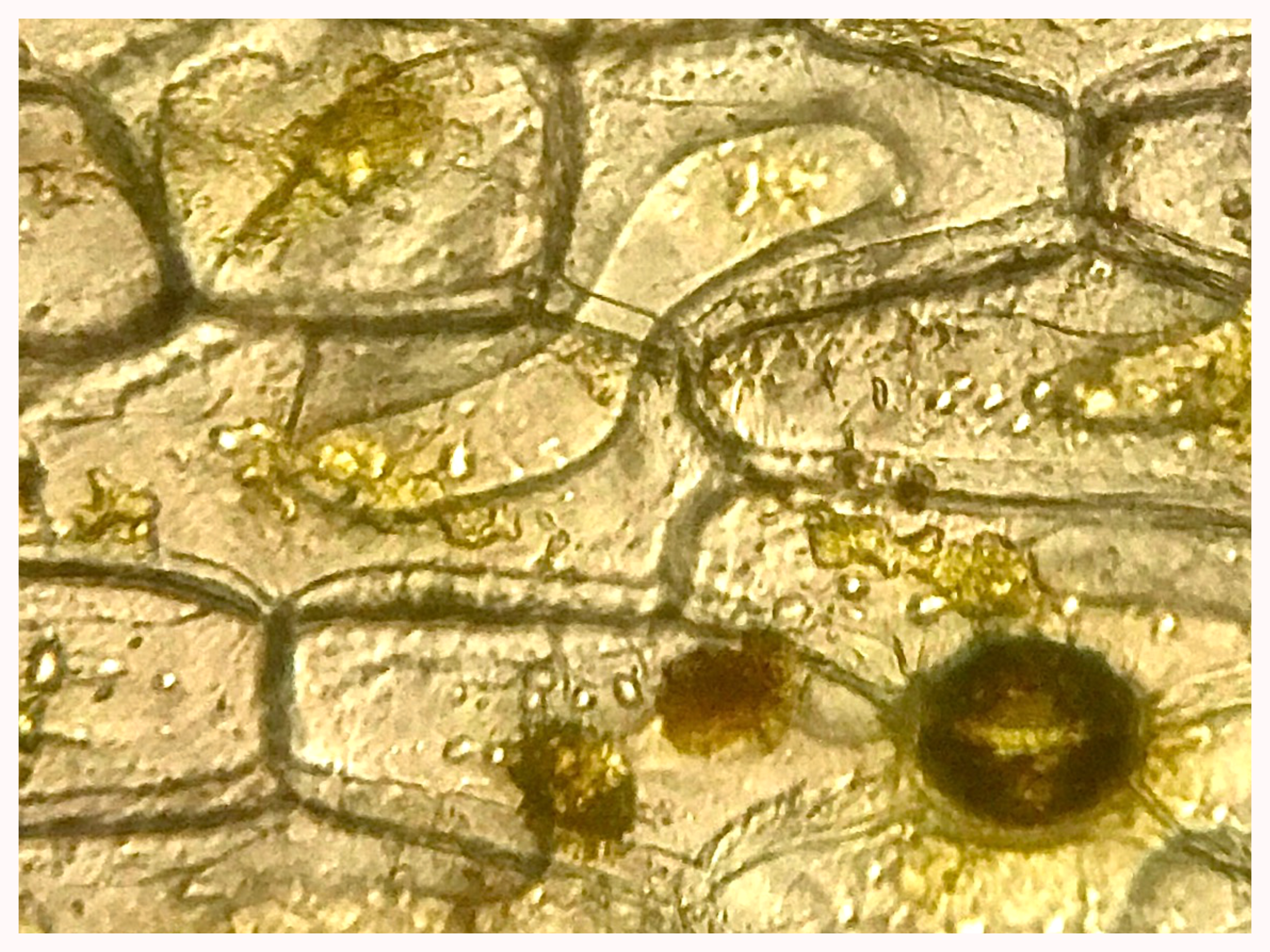
Aloe vera sample stained using a curcumin tincture (made by dissolving turmeric powder in absolute ethanol, centrifuging and then filtering).

== Stainability of tissues ==
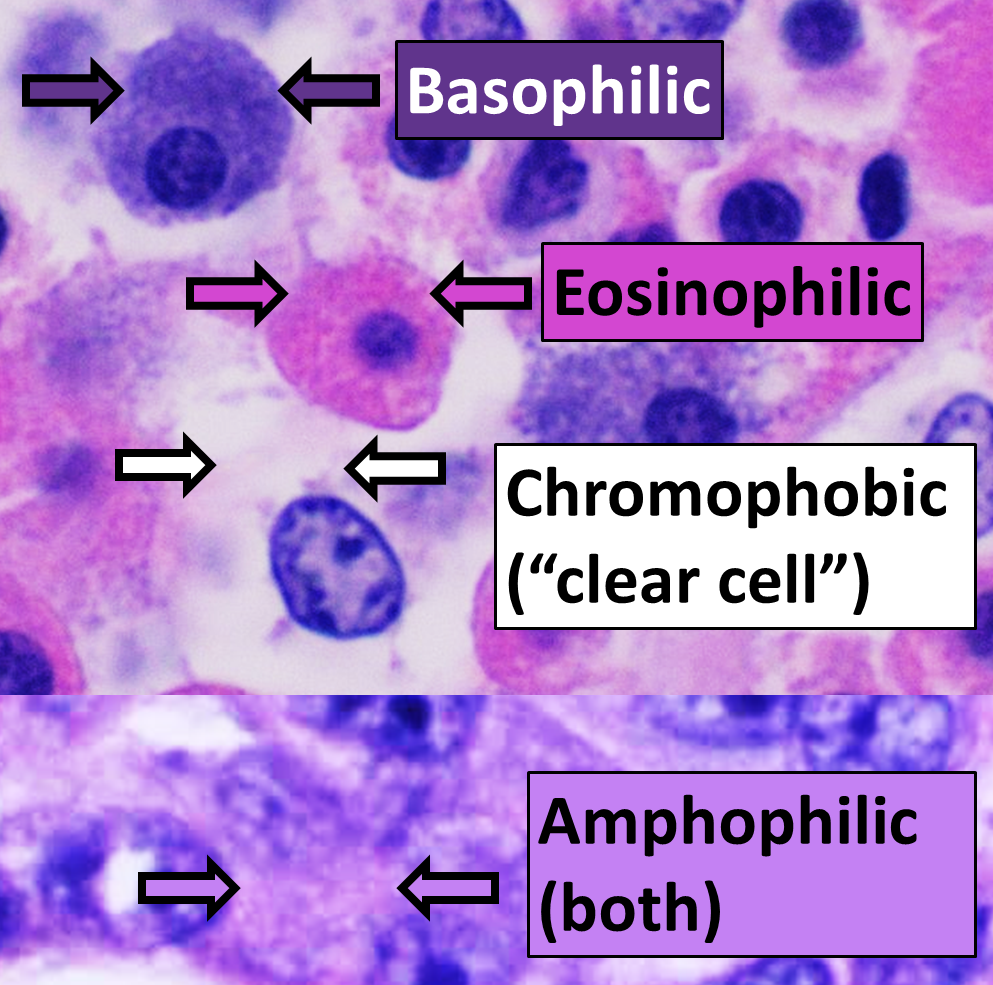
Main staining types when using hematoxylin and eosin (H&E).

Tissues which take up stains are called chromatic. Chromosomes were so named because of their ability to absorb a violet stain.

Positive affinity for a specific stain may be designated by the suffix -philic. For example, tissues that stain with an azure stain may be referred to as azurophilic. This may also be used for more generalized staining properties, such as acidophilic for tissues that stain by acidic stains (most notably eosin), basophilic when staining in basic dyes, and amphophilic when staining with either acid or basic dyes. In contrast, chromophobic tissues do not take up coloured dye readily.

== Electron microscopy ==
As in light microscopy, stains can be used to enhance contrast in transmission electron microscopy. Electron-dense compounds of heavy metals are typically used.

=== Phosphotungstic acid ===
Phosphotungstic acid is a common negative stain for viruses, nerves, polysaccharides, and other biological tissue materials. It is mostly used in a .5-2% ph form making it neutral and is paired with water to make an aqueous solution. Phosphotungstic acid is filled with electron dense matter that stains the background surrounding the specimen dark and the specimen itself light. This process is not the normal positive technique for staining where the specimen is dark and the background remains light.

=== Osmium tetroxide ===
Osmium tetroxide is used in optical microscopy to stain lipids. It dissolves in fats, and is reduced by organic materials to elemental osmium, an easily visible black substance. Because it is a heavy metal that absorbs electrons, it is perhaps the most common stain used for morphology in biological electron microscopy. It is also used for the staining of various polymers for the study of their morphology by TEM. OsO_{4} is very volatile and extremely toxic. It is a strong oxidizing agent as the osmium has an oxidation number of +8. It aggressively oxidizes many materials, leaving behind a deposit of non-volatile osmium in a lower oxidation state.

=== Ruthenium tetroxide ===
Ruthenium tetroxide is equally volatile and even more aggressive than osmium tetraoxide and able to stain even materials that resist the osmium stain, e.g. polyethylene.

Other chemicals used in electron microscopy staining include: ammonium molybdate, cadmium iodide, carbohydrazide, ferric chloride, hexamine, indium trichloride, lanthanum(III) nitrate, lead acetate, lead citrate, lead(II) nitrate, periodic acid, phosphomolybdic acid, potassium ferricyanide, potassium ferrocyanide, ruthenium red, silver nitrate, silver proteinate, sodium chloroaurate, thallium nitrate, thiosemicarbazide, uranyl acetate, uranyl nitrate, and vanadyl sulfate.

== See also ==
- Biological Stain Commission: Third-party quality control and certification of stains
- Cytology: the study of cells
- Histology: the study of tissues
- Immunohistochemistry: the use of antisera to label specific antigens
- Ruthenium(II) tris(bathophenanthroline disulfonate), a protein dye.
- Vital stain: stains that do not kill cells
- PAGE: separation of protein molecules
- Barium enema - a type of in vivo stain that creates contrast in the x-ray part of the light spectrum
- Diaphonization
