= Malachite green =

Organic dye

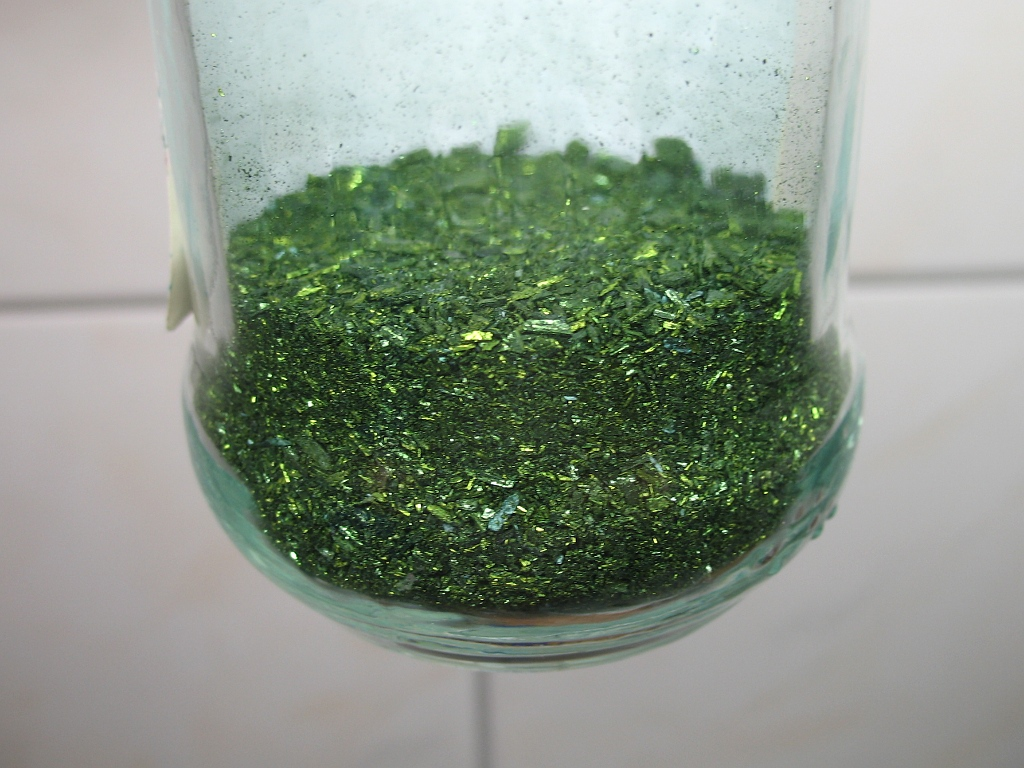

Names
- Preferred IUPAC name 4-{[4-(Dimethylamino)phenyl](phenyl)methylidene}-N,N-dimethylcyclohexa-2,5-dien-1-iminium chloride
- Other names Aniline green; Basic green 4; Diamond green B; Victoria green B

Identifiers
CAS Number	569-64-2 (chloride salt); 2437-29-8 (oxalate salt)
3D model (JSmol)	Interactive image
ChEBI	CHEBI:72449
ChEMBL	ChEMBL186357
ChemSpider	10820
ECHA InfoCard	100.008.476
KEGG	C18367
PubChem CID	11294
UNII	12058M7ORO
CompTox Dashboard (EPA)	DTXSID1025512
- InChI: InChI=1S/C23H25N2.ClH/c1-24(2)21-14-10-19(11-15-21)23(18-8-6-5-7-9-18)20-12-16-22(17-13-20)25(3)4;/h5-17H,1-4H3;1H/q+1;/p-1 Key: FDZZZRQASAIRJF-UHFFFAOYSA-M; InChI=1/C23H25N2.ClH/c1-24(2)21-14-10-19(11-15-21)23(18-8-6-5-7-9-18)20-12-16-22(17-13-20)25(3)4;/h5-17H,1-4H3;1H/q+1;/p-1 Key: FDZZZRQASAIRJF-REWHXWOFAA
- SMILES: CN(C)c1ccc(cc1)C(=C2C=CC(=[N+](C)C)C=C2)c3ccccc3.[Cl-]

Properties
Chemical formula	C_{23}H_{25}ClN_{2} (chloride)
Molar mass	364.911 g/mol (chloride)

Pharmacology
ATCvet code	QP53AX16 (WHO)

Hazards
- Occupational safety and health (OHS/OSH)
Main hazards	Moderately toxic, Extreme irritant
- GHS labelling
Pictograms	(GHS05: Corrosive) (GHS07: Exclamation mark) (GHS08: Health hazard) (GHS09: Environmental hazard)
Signal word	Danger
Hazard statements	H302, H318, H361d, H410
Precautionary statements	P264, P270, P280, P301+P312, P305+P351+P338, P310, P330, P501
- Lethal dose or concentration (LD, LC)
LD_{50} (median dose)	80mg/kg (oral, mouse)
- Except where otherwise noted, data are given for materials in their standard state (at 25 °C [77 °F], 100 kPa). verify (what is ?) Infobox references

Malachite green is an organic compound that is used as a dyestuff and controversially as an antimicrobial in aquaculture. Malachite green is traditionally used as a dye for materials such as silk, leather, and paper. Despite its name the dye is not prepared from the mineral malachite; the name just comes from the similarity of color.

== Preparation ==
The leuco form of malachite green was first prepared by Hermann Fischer in 1877 by condensing benzaldehyde and dimethylaniline in the molecular ratio 1:2 in the presence of sulfuric acid.

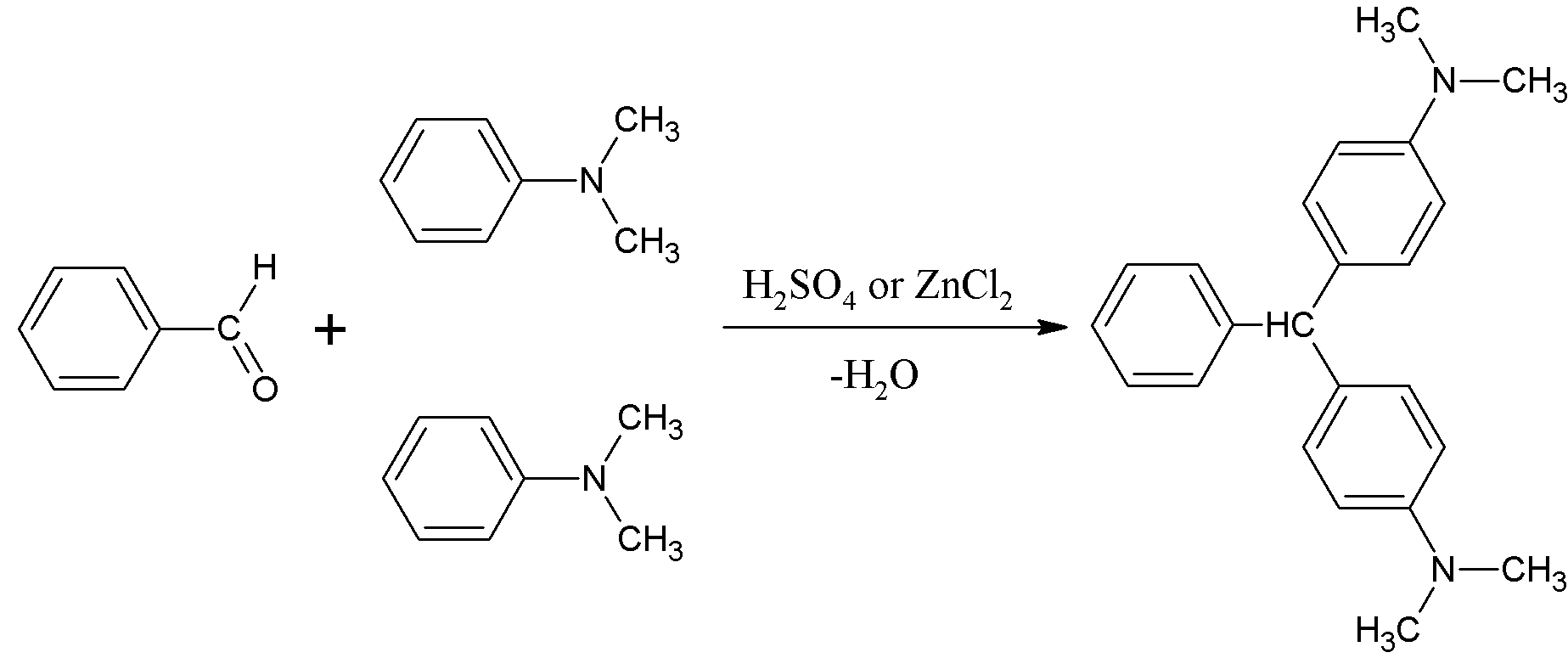
Synthesis of malachite green

== Uses ==
Malachite green is traditionally used as a dye. Kilotonnes of MG and related triarylmethane dyes are produced annually for this purpose.

MG is active against the oomycete Saprolegnia, which infects fish eggs in commercial aquaculture, MG has been used to treat Saprolegnia and is used as an antibacterial. It is a very popular treatment against Ichthyophthirius multifiliis in freshwater aquaria. The principal metabolite, leuco-malachite green (LMG), is found in fish treated with malachite green, and this finding is the basis of controversy and government regulation. See also Antimicrobials in aquaculture.

MG has frequently been used to catch thieves and pilferers. The bait, usually money, is sprinkled with the anhydrous powder. Anyone handling the contaminated money will find that on upon washing the hands, a green stain on the skin that lasts for several days will result.

=== Niche uses ===
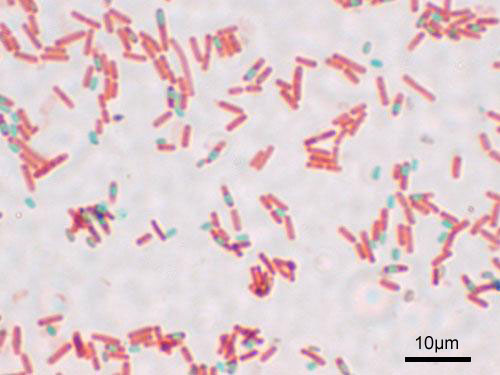
A preparation of Bacillus subtilis showing endospores stained with malachite green (vegetative cells stained pink with safranin counterstain)

Numerous niche applications exploit the intense color of MG. It is used as a biological stain for microscopic analysis of cell biology and tissue samples. In the Gimenez staining method, basic fuchsin stains bacteria red or magenta, and malachite green is used as a blue-green counterstain. Malachite green is also used in endospore staining, since it can directly stain endospores within bacterial cells; here a safranin counterstain is often used. Malachite green is a part of Alexander's pollen stain. Malachite green can also be used as a saturable absorber in dye lasers, or as a pH indicator between pH 0.2–1.8. However, this use is relatively rare. Leuco-malachite green (LMG) is used as a detection method for latent blood in forensic science. Hemoglobin catalyzes the reaction between LMG and hydrogen peroxide, converting the colorless LMG into malachite green. Therefore, the appearance of a green color indicates the presence of blood.

A set of malachite green derivatives is also a key component in a fluorescence microscopy tool called the fluorogen activating protein/fluorogen system. Malachite green is in a class of molecules called fluorophores. When malachite green's rotational freedom is restricted, it transforms from a non fluorescent molecule to a highly fluorescent molecule. In the fluorogen activating protein tool, established by a group at Carnegie Mellon University, Malachite green binds a specific fluorogen activating protein to become highly fluorescent. Expression of the fluorogen activating protein as fusions of targeting domains can impart subcellular localization. Its use is similar to that of GFP but has the added benefit of having a 'dark state' before the malachite green fluorophore is added. This is especially useful for FRET studies.

== Structures and properties ==
Malachite green is classified in the dyestuff industry as a triarylmethane dye and also using in pigment industry. Formally, malachite green refers to the chloride salt [C_{6}H_{5}C(C_{6}H_{4}N(CH_{3})_{2})_{2}]Cl, although the term malachite green is used loosely and often just refers to the colored cation. The oxalate salt is also marketed. The anions have no effect on the color. The intense green color of the cation results from a strong absorption band at 621 nm (extinction coefficient of 10^{5} M^{−1} cm^{−1}).

Malachite green is prepared by the condensation of benzaldehyde and dimethylaniline to give leuco malachite green (LMG):

C_{6}H_{5}CHO + C_{6}H_{5}N(CH_{3})_{2} → (C_{6}H_{5}N(CH_{3})_{2})_{2}C_{6}H_{5} + H_{2}O

Second, this colorless leuco compound, a relative of triphenylmethane, is oxidized to the cation that is MG:

C_{6}H_{5}CH(C_{6}H_{4}N(CH_{3})_{2})_{2} + HCl + ½ O_{2} → [C_{6}H_{5}C(C_{6}H_{4}N(CH_{3})_{2})_{2}]Cl + H_{2}O

A typical oxidizing agent is manganese dioxide.

Hydrolysis of MG gives an alcohol:

[C_{6}H_{5}C(C_{6}H_{4}N(CH_{3})_{2})_{2}]Cl + H_{2}O → C_{6}H_{5}C(OH)(C_{6}H_{4}N(CH_{3})_{2})_{2} + HCl

This alcohol is important because it, not MG, traverses cell membranes. Once inside the cell, it is metabolized into LMG. Only the cation MG is deeply colored, whereas the leuco and alcohol derivatives are not. This difference arises because only the cationic form has extended pi-delocalization, which allows the molecule to absorb visible light.

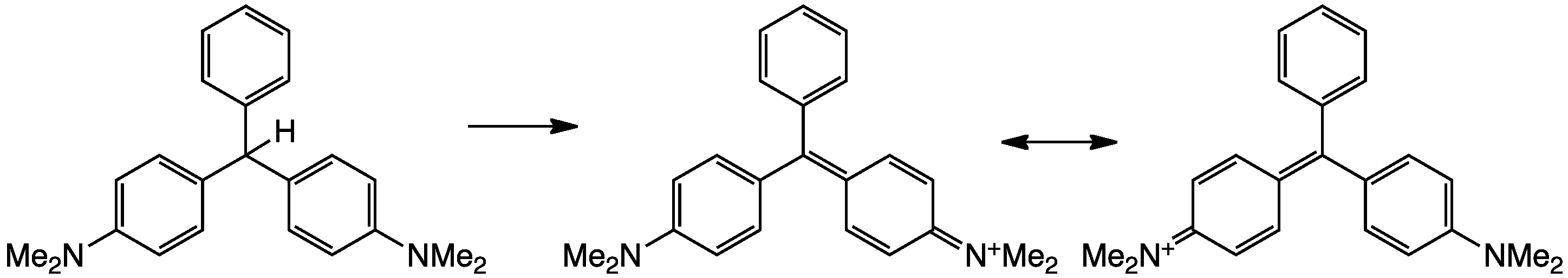
On the left is leuco-malachite Green (LMG) and on the right are the two equivalent resonance structures of the MG cation. The alcohol derivative of MG is derived from LMG by replacement of the unique C–H by C–OH.

Malachite green (second transition) (pH indicator)
below pH 11.5		above pH 13.2
(green) 11.5	⇌	13.2 (colorless)

Malachite green (first transition) (pH indicator)
below pH 0.2		above pH 1.8
(yellow) 0.2	⇌	1.8 (green)

== Regulation ==
In 1992, Canadian authorities determined that eating fish contaminated with malachite green posed a significant health risk. Malachite green was classified a Class II Health Hazard. Due to its low manufacturing cost, malachite green is still used in certain countries with less restrictive laws for non aquaculture purposes. In 2005, analysts in Hong Kong found traces of malachite green in eels and fish imported from China. In 2006, the United States Food and Drug Administration (FDA) detected malachite green in seafood from China, among others, where the substance is also banned for use in aquaculture. In June 2007, the FDA blocked the importation of several varieties of seafood due to continued malachite green contamination.

Malachite green has been banned in the United States since 1983 in food-related applications. The substance is also banned in the United Kingdom. It is prohibited from the use in food in Macao.

Animals metabolize malachite green to its leuco form. Being lipophillic (the leuco form has a log P of 5.70), the metabolite is retained in catfish muscle longer (HL = 10 days) than is the parent molecule (HL = 2.8 days).

== Toxicity ==
The LD_{50} (oral, mouse) is 80 mg/kg. Rats fed malachite green experience "a dose-related increase in liver DNA adducts" along with lung adenomas. Leucomalachite green causes an "increase in the number and severity of changes". As leucomalachite green is the primary metabolite of malachite green and is retained in fish muscle much longer, most human dietary intake of malachite green from eating fish would be in the leuco form. During the experiment, rats were fed up to 543 ppm of leucomalachite green, an extreme amount compared to the average 5 ppb discovered in fish. After a period of two years, an increase in lung adenomas in male rats was discovered but no incidences of liver tumors. Therefore, it could be concluded that malachite green caused carcinogenic symptoms, but a direct link between malachite green and liver tumor was not established.

== Detection ==
Although malachite green has almost no fluorescence in aqueous solution (quantum yield 7.9 × 10^{−5}), several research groups have developed technologies to detect malachite green. For example, Zhao et al., demonstrated the use of malachite green aptamer in microcantilever based sensors to detect low concentration of malachite green.
