= Gimenez stain =

Biological stain for identifying bacterial infections

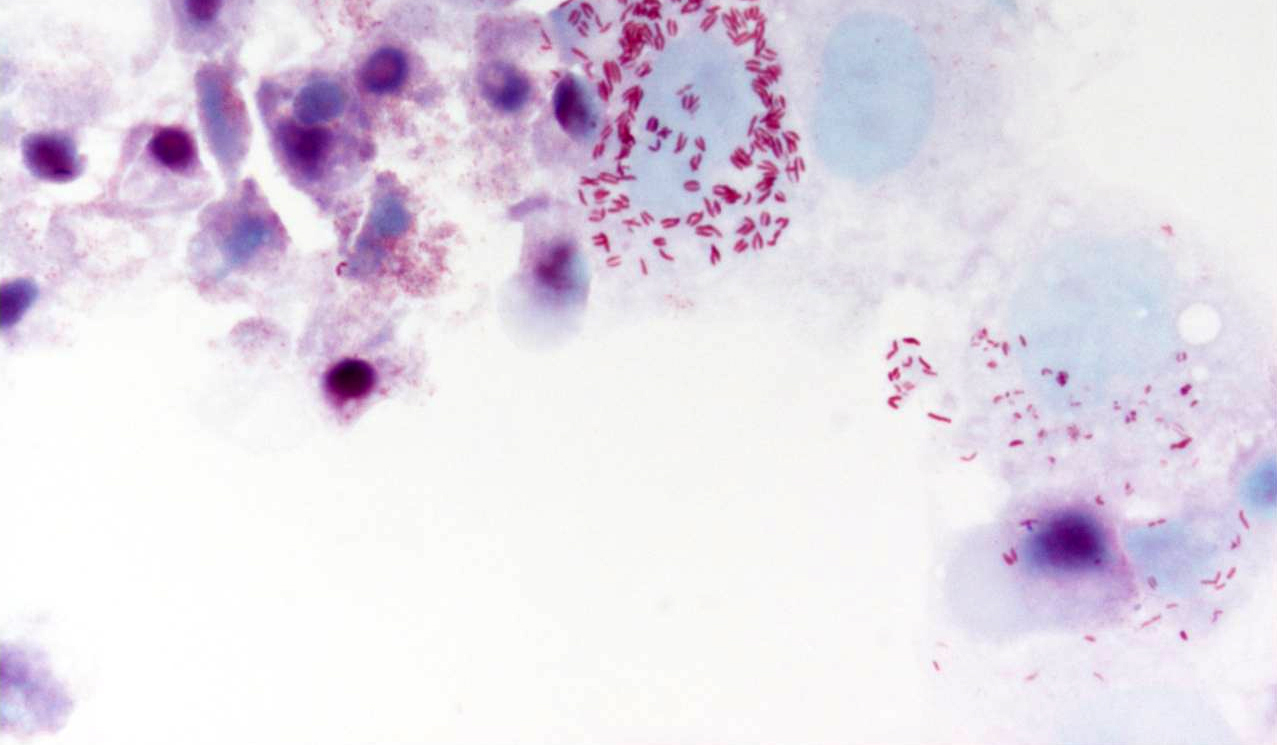
Diplorickettsia massiliensis grown in XTC-2 cells, Gimenez staining

The Gimenez staining technique uses biological stains to detect and identify bacterial infections in tissue samples. Although largely superseded by techniques like Giemsa staining, the Gimenez technique may be valuable for detecting certain slow-growing or fastidious bacteria.

Basic fuchsin stain in aqueous solution with phenol and ethanol colours many bacteria (both gram positive and Gram negative) red, magenta, or pink. A malachite green counterstain gives a blue-green background cast to the surrounding tissue.

== See also ==
- Histology
- List of common staining protocols
- Microscopy
