= Moeller stain =

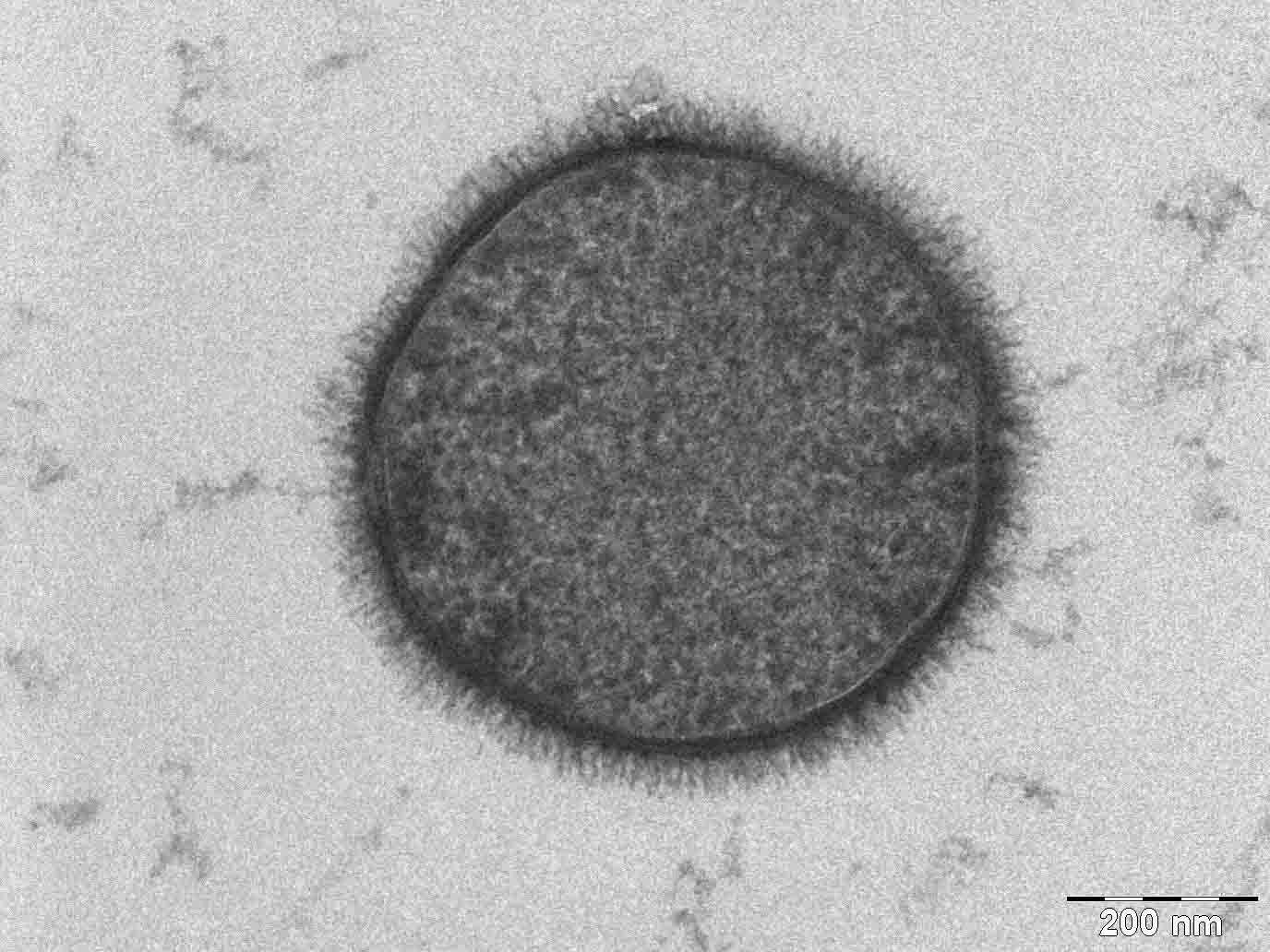
Endospore made visible with a stain

Moeller staining involves the use of a steamed dye reagent in order to increase the stainability of endospores. Carbol fuchsin is the primary stain used in this method. Endospores are stained red, while the counterstain methylene blue stains the vegetative bacteria blue.

Endospores are surrounded by a highly resistant spore coat, which is highly resistant to excessive heat, freezing, desiccation, as well as chemical agents. More importantly, for identification, spores are resistant to commonly employed staining techniques; therefore alternative staining methods are required.

== Method ==
Carbol fuchsin is applied to a heat-fixed slide. The slide is then heated over a bunsen burner, or suspended over a hot water bath, covered with a paper towel, and steamed for 3 minutes. The slide is rinsed with acidified ethanol, and counter-stained with Methylene blue. An improved method involves the addition of the surfactant Tergitol 7 to the carbol fuchsin stain, and the omission of the steaming step.

== See also ==
- Schaeffer–Fulton stain
