= Biotechnic & Histochemistry =

- Discipline: Biotechnology
- Language: English
- Edited by: G.S. Nettleton

Publication details
- Former name: Stain Technology
- History: 1926–present
- Publisher: Taylor & Francis on behalf of the Biological Stain Commission
- Frequency: 8/year
- Impact factor: 1.718 (2020)

Standard abbreviations
- ISO 4: Biotech. Histochem.

Indexing
- CODEN: BIHIEU
- ISSN: 1052-0295 (print); 1473-7760 (web)
- LCCN: 91641272
- OCLC no.: 60626682

Links
- Journal homepage; Online access; Online archive

Biotechnic & Histochemistry is a peer-reviewed scientific journal that covers all aspects of histochemistry and microtechnic in the biological sciences from botany to cell biology to medicine. It is published by Taylor & Francis on behalf of the Biological Stain Commission. The journal was established in 1926 as Stain Technology by Harold J. Conn. It obtained its current title in 1991. The editor-in-chief is G. S. Nettleton.

== Abstracting and indexing ==
The journal is abstracted and indexed in Index Medicus/MEDLINE/PubMed, Current Contents/Life Sciences, Science Citation Index, and EMBASE/Excerpta Medica. According to the Journal Citation Reports, the journal has a 2020 impact factor of 1.718.
