= Herbert William Conn =

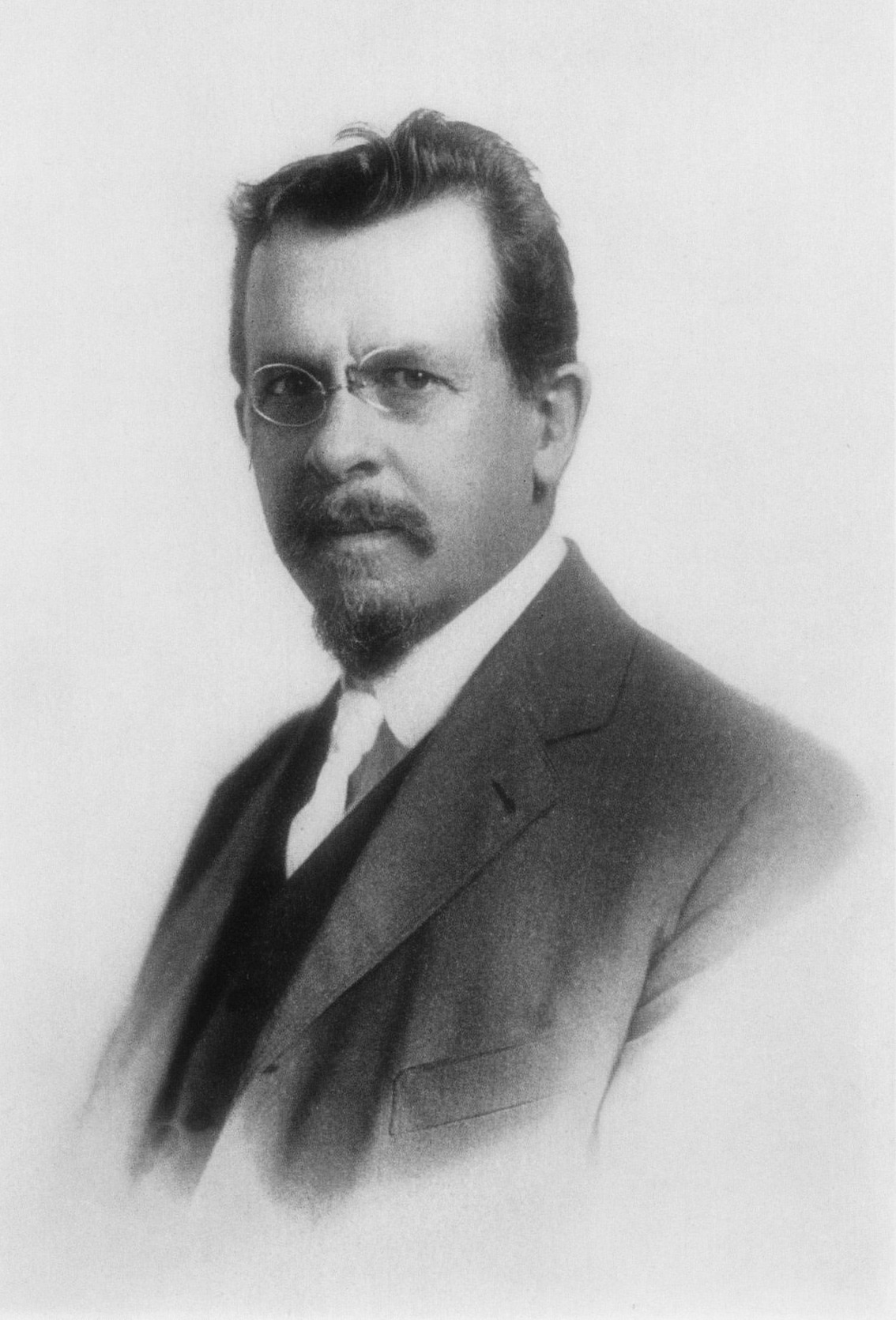
- Born: January 10, 1859; Fitchburg, Massachusetts, US
- Died: April 18, 1917 (aged 58); Middletown, Connecticut, US
- Education: Boston University; Johns Hopkins University
- Occupations: Bacteriologist, educator
- Spouse: Julia M. Joel

Herbert William Conn (January 10, 1859 – April 18, 1917) was an American bacteriologist and educator.

Born in Fitchburg, Massachusetts, the son of Reuben Rice Conn and Harriot Elizabeth, he became ill from rheumatic fever during his youth and had to be withdrawn from public school because of his poor health. Instead, he was educated at Cushing Academy, a private school in Ashburnham, Massachusetts, then matriculated to Boston University where he graduated second in his class with an A.B. in 1881. He entered graduate school at Johns Hopkins University in 1881, receiving his Ph.D. on animal morphology, physiology, and histology in 1884 with a thesis titled, "Life-history of Thalassema", for which he received a Walker prize from the Boston Society of Natural History. In August, 1885, he was married to Julia M. Joel; the couple had two children including Harold J. Conn, a soil bacteriologist and stain expert.

Following his graduation, Conn joined the staff of Wesleyan University as a biology instructor, becoming a biology professor in 1887 and founder of the university's biology department. He would hold the chair of biology for the remainder of his career. The same year he was named acting director of the department of zoology at Martha's Vineyard Summer Institute. In 1889–90 he taught biology at Trinity College, then was director of the Cold Springs Biological Laboratory, today's Cold Spring Harbor Laboratory, in 1890–97.

Beginning in December, 1898, he helped to found the American Society for Microbiology; serving as its secretary for three years, then as its president in 1902. In 1901 he became a bacteriology lecturer at the Connecticut Agricultural College. He was chosen as the Connecticut State Bacteriologist in 1905, and helped to organize and direct the State Bacteriological Laboratory. In March 1911, the New York Milk Committee appointed him to be a member of the National Commission on Milk Standards.

During his career, Conn published more than 150 papers, as well as a series of school textbooks. He is notable for discovering that typhoid fever can be distributed by oysters, and was a recognized specialist in the bacteriology of dairy products. Conn was a proponent of home economics, and his text Bacteria, Yeasts, and Moulds in the Home became a standard textbook in home economics courses.

In addition to his work on bacteria and food safety, late in his career Conn also wrote against some of the theories of eugenics which were gaining popularity in the early 20th century. He argued that social factors must be taken into account when trying to understand human outcomes, and not merely genetics.

== Bibliography ==
- Life history of Thalassema (1886)
- Evolution of to-day (1886)
- The living world (1891)
- Some uses of bacteria (1892)
- "The Isolation of Rennet from Bacteria Cultures" (1892)
- The story of germ life (1897)
- The story of the living machine (1899)
- The method of evolution (1900)
- An elementary physiology and hygiene for use in schools (1902)
- Bacteria in milk and its products (1903)
- Introductory physiology and hygiene: for use in primary grades (1904)
- The Camembert type of soft cheese in the United States (1905)
- Agricultural bacteriology: a study of the relation of germ life to the farm, with laboratory experiments for students (1909)
- Bacteria, yeasts, and moulds in the home (1912)
- Biology: an introductory study for use in colleges (1912)
- Practical dairy bacteriology: prepared for the use of students, dairymen, and all interested in the problems of the relation of milk to public health (1914)
- Social heredity and social evolution (1914)
- Physiology and health (1916)

=== Publications ===
- Il metodo dell'evoluzione (in Italian). Torino: Fratelli Bocca§. 1907.
