= Safranin =

- Safranin

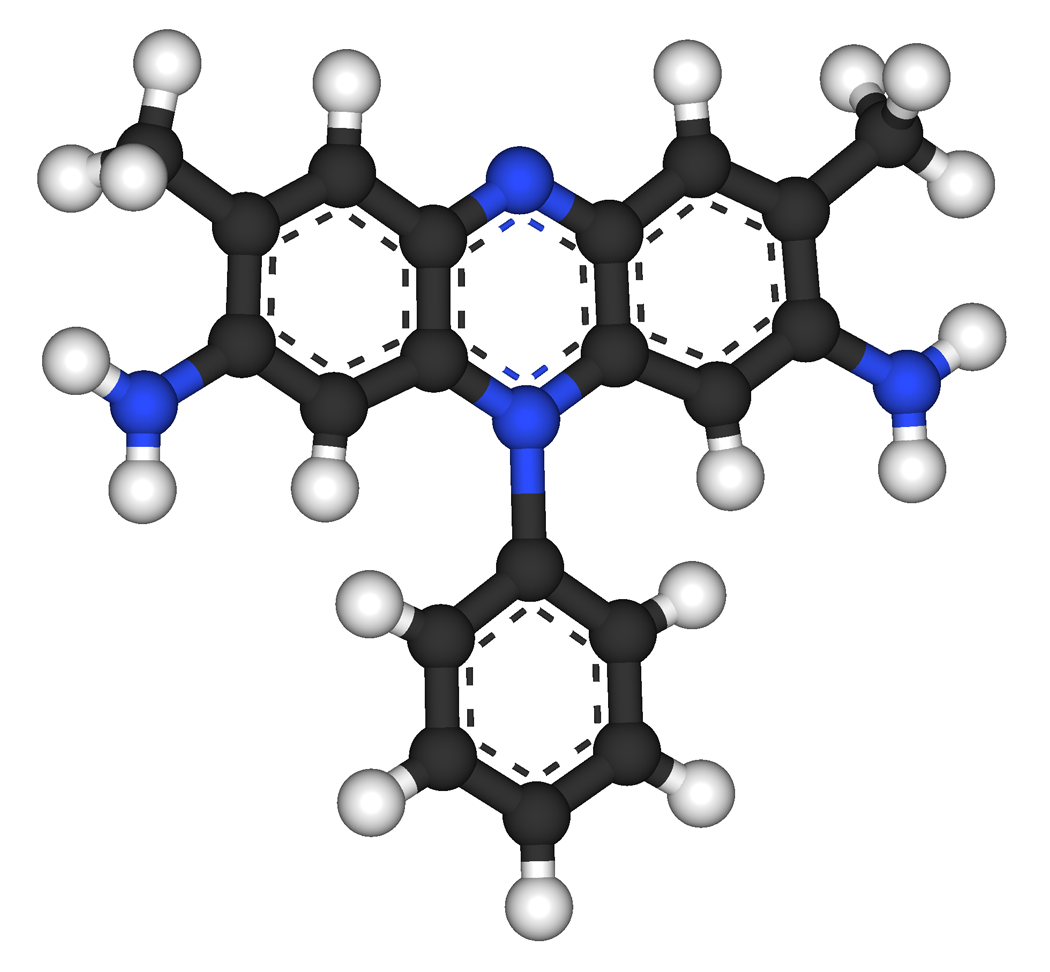
- Safranin

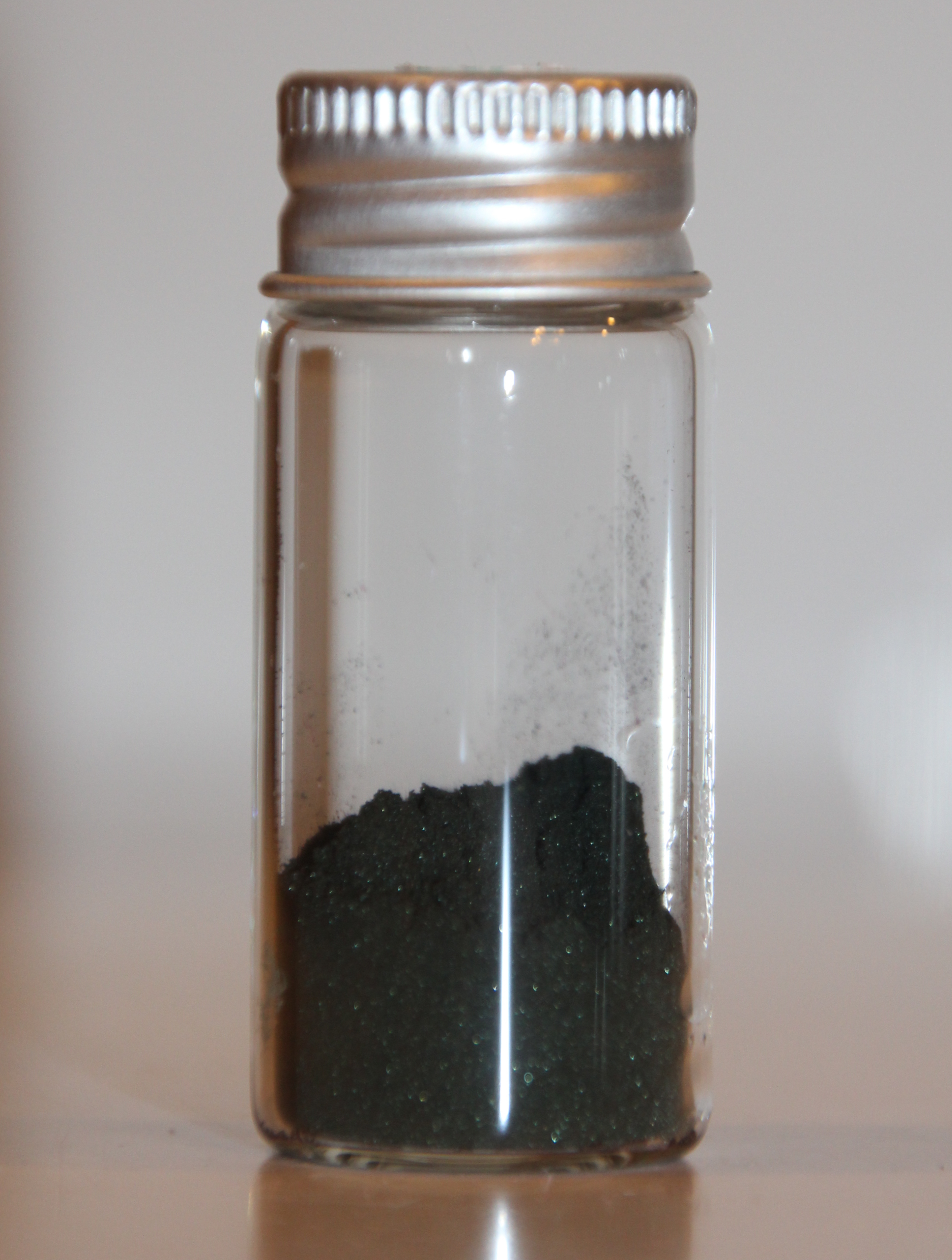
Solid safranin
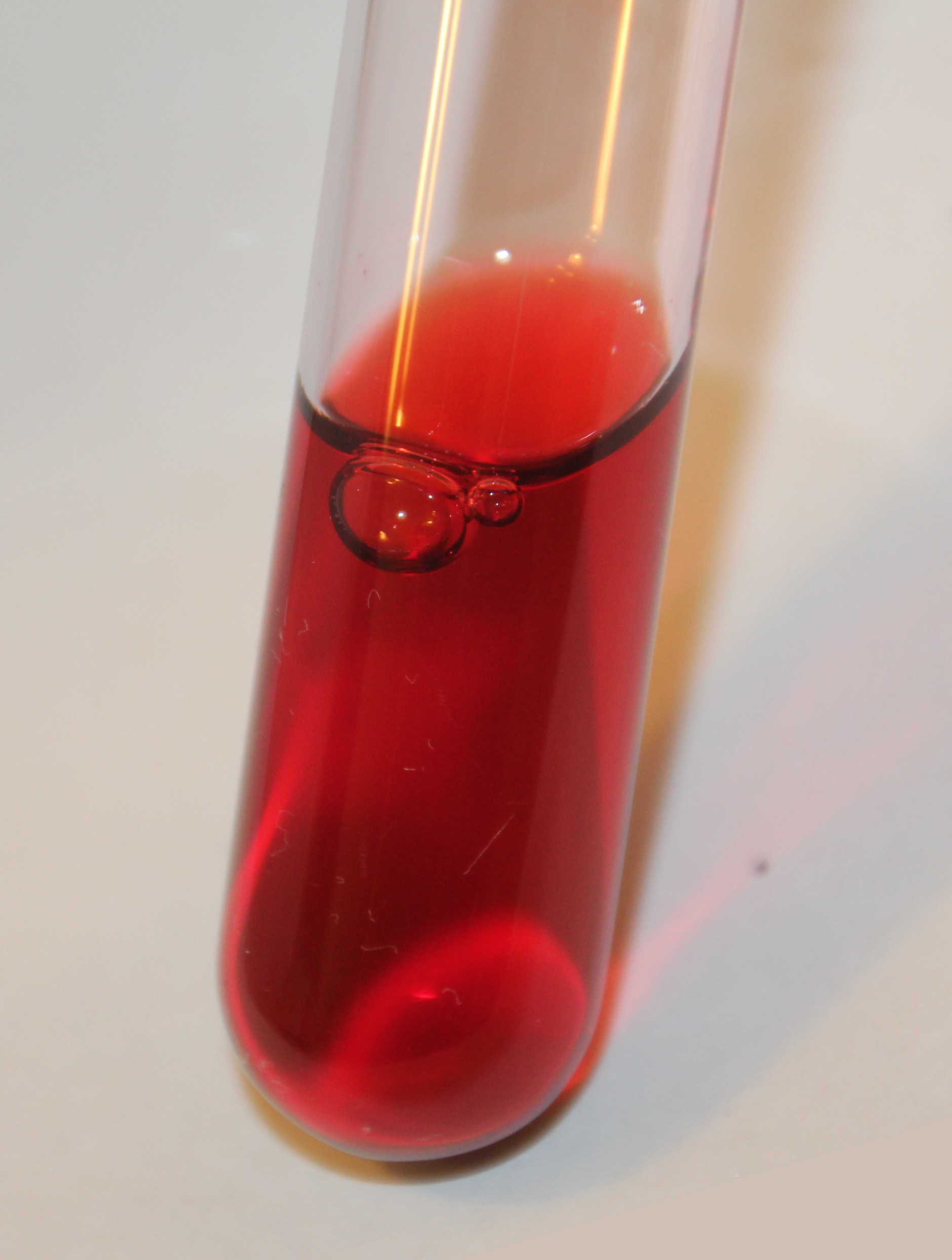
Safranin in aqueous solution

Names
- Preferred IUPAC name 3,7-Diamino-2,8-dimethyl-5-phenylphenazin-5-ium chloride

Identifiers
| CAS Number | 477-73-6 |
| 3D model (JSmol) | Interactive image |
| ChEBI | CHEBI:197447 |
| ChemSpider | 2005991 |
| ECHA InfoCard | 100.006.836 |
| PubChem CID | 2723800 |
| UNII | XTX0YXU2HV |
| CompTox Dashboard (EPA) | DTXSID60874047 |
- InChI: InChI=1S/C20H18N4.ClH/c1-12-8-17-19(10-15(12)21)24(14-6-4-3-5-7-14)20-11-16(22)13(2)9-18(20)23-17;/h3-11H,1-2H3,(H3,21,22);1H Key: OARRHUQTFTUEOS-UHFFFAOYSA-N; InChI=1/C20H18N4.ClH/c1-12-8-17-19(10-15(12)21)24(14-6-4-3-5-7-14)20-11-16(22)13(2)9-18(20)23-17;/h3-11H,1-2H3,(H3,21,22);1H Key: OARRHUQTFTUEOS-UHFFFAOYAR; InChI=1/C20H18N4/c1-12-8-17-19(10-15(12)21)24(14-6-4-3-5-7-14)20-11-16(22)13(2)9-18(20)23-17/h3-11H,1-2H3,(H3,21,22)/p+1
- SMILES: [Cl-].n1c4c([n+](c2c1cc(c(N)c2)C)c3ccccc3)cc(c(c4)C)N

Properties
| Chemical formula | C_{20}H_{19}ClN_{4} |
| Molar mass | 350.85 g·mol^{−1} |
| Solubility in water | Soluble |

Hazards
- GHS labelling
| Pictograms | (GHS05: Corrosive) (GHS07: Exclamation mark) |
| Signal word | Danger |
| Hazard statements | H315, H318 |
| Precautionary statements | P264, P280, P302+P352, P305+P351+P338, P310, P332+P313, P362 |
| NFPA 704 (fire diamond) | 2 0 0 |
- Except where otherwise noted, data are given for materials in their standard state (at 25 °C [77 °F], 100 kPa). verify (what is ?) Infobox references

Safranin (Safranin O or basic red 2) is a biological stain used in histology and cytology. Safranin is used as a counterstain in some staining protocols, colouring cell nuclei red. This is the classic counterstain in both Gram stains and endospore staining. It can also be used for the detection of cartilage, mucin and mast cell granules.

Safranin typically has the chemical structure shown at right (sometimes described as dimethyl safranin). There is also trimethyl safranin, which has an added methyl group in the ortho- position (see Arene substitution pattern) of the lower ring. Both compounds behave essentially identically in biological staining applications, and most manufacturers of safranin do not distinguish between the two. Commercial safranin preparations often contain a blend of both types.

Safranin is also used as redox indicator in analytical chemistry.

== Safranines ==
Safranines are the azonium compounds of symmetrical 2,8-dimethyl-3,7-diaminophenazine. They are obtained by the joint oxidation of one molecule of a para-diamine with two molecules of a primary amine; by the condensation of para-aminoazo compounds with primary amines, and by the action of para-nitrosodialkylanilines with secondary bases such as diphenylmetaphenylenediamine. They are crystalline solids showing a characteristic green metallic lustre; they are readily soluble in water and dye red or violet. They are strong bases and form stable monacid salts. Their alcoholic solution shows a yellow-red fluorescence.

Phenosafranine is not very stable in the free state; its chloride forms green plates. It can be readily diazotized, and the diazonium salt when boiled with alcohol yields aposafranine or benzene induline, C_{18}H_{12}N_{3}. Friedrich Kehrmann showed that aposafranine could be diazotized in the presence of cold concentrated sulfuric acid, and the diazonium salt on boiling with alcohol yielded phenylphenazonium salts. Aposafranone, C_{18}H_{12}N_{2}O, is formed by heating aposafranine with concentrated hydrochloric acid. These three compounds are perhaps to be represented as ortho- or as para-quinones. The "safranine" of commerce is an ortho-tolusafranine. The first aniline dye-stuff to be prepared on a manufacturing scale was mauveine (1856), which was obtained by Sir William Henry Perkin by heating crude aniline with potassium dichromate and sulfuric acid.

Mauveine was converted to parasafranine (1,8-dimethylsafranine) by Perkin in 1878 by oxidative/reductive loss of the 7N-para-tolyl group. Another well known safranin is phenosafranine (C.I. 50200, 3,7-diamino-5-phenylphenazinium chloride) widely used as a histological dye, photosensitizer and redox probe.
