= Counterstain =

Biological stain whose color contrasts with the principal stain

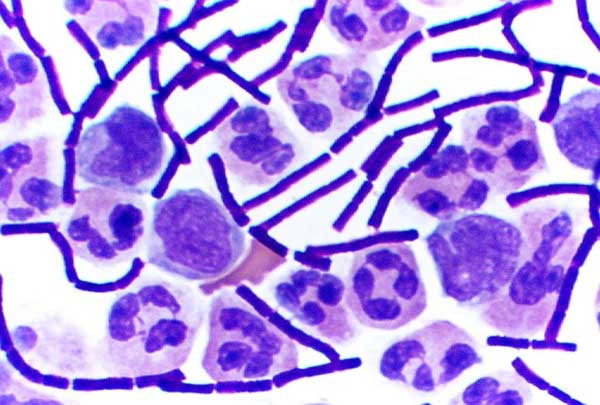
Gram-positive anthrax bacteria with counterstained white blood cells

A counterstain is a stain with colour contrasting to the principal stain, making the stained structure easily visible using a microscope.

Examples include the malachite green counterstain to the fuchsine stain in the Gimenez staining technique and the eosin counterstain to haematoxylin in the H&E stain. In Gram staining, crystal violet stains only Gram-positive bacteria, and safranin counterstain is applied which stains all cells, allowing the identification of Gram-negative bacteria as well. An alternative method uses dilute carbofluozide. Counterstains are sometimes used to separate animals from organic detritus in microbiology studies.
