= IN3 =

IN3, or similar, may refer to:

- cubic inch (in^{3}), a unit of volume
- Indiana State Road 3, a road in the eastern part of the U.S. state of Indiana.
- Indiana's 3rd congressional district, a congressional district in the U.S. state of Indiana
- Internet Interdisciplinary Institute, the research body of the Open University of Catalonia
- Iodine azide, chemical formula IN_{3}
