= Iodine azide =

Names
- IUPAC name Iodine azide
- Other names Azidoiodine, Iodo azide

Identifiers
CAS Number	14696-82-3
3D model (JSmol)	Interactive image
ChemSpider	55652
PubChem CID	61763
CompTox Dashboard (EPA)	DTXSID70163550
- InChI: InChI=1S/IN3/c1-3-4-2
- SMILES: IN=[N+]=[N-]

Properties
Chemical formula	IN_{3}
Molar mass	168.92 g/mol
Appearance	yellow solid
Solubility in water	decomposes
Vapor pressure	2 Torr

Structure
Crystal structure	orthorhombic
Space group	Pbam, No. 55

Related compounds
Related compounds	Hydrazoic acid Fluorine azide Chlorine azide Bromine azide
- Except where otherwise noted, data are given for materials in their standard state (at 25 °C [77 °F], 100 kPa). Infobox references

Iodine azide (IN_{3}) is an explosive inorganic compound, which in ordinary conditions is a yellow solid. Formally, it is an inter-pseudohalogen.

== Preparation ==
Iodine azide can be prepared from the reaction between silver azide and elemental iodine:

AgN_{3} + I_{2} → IN_{3} + AgI

Since silver azide can only be handled safely while moist, but even small traces of water cause the iodine azide to decompose, this synthesis is done by suspending the silver azide in dichloromethane and adding a drying agent before reaction with the iodine. In this way, a pure solution of iodine azide results, which can then be carefully evaporated to form needle-shaped golden crystals.

This reaction was used in the original synthesis of iodine azide in 1900, where it was obtained as unstable solutions in ether and impure crystals contaminated by iodine.

Iodine azide can also be generated in situ by reacting iodine monochloride and sodium azide under conditions where it is not explosive.

== Properties ==
In the solid state, iodine azide exists as a one-dimensional polymeric structure, forming two polymorphs, both of which crystallize in an orthorhombic lattice with the space group Pbam. The gas phase exists as monomeric units.

Iodine azide exhibits both high reactivity and comparative stability, consequences of the polarity of the I–N bond. The N_{3} group introduced by substitution with iodine azide can frequently undergo subsequent reactions due to its high energy content.

The isolated compound is strongly shock- and friction-sensitive. Its explosivity has been characterized as follows:

Normal gas volume	265 L/kg
Heat of explosion	2091 kJ/kg
Trauzl rating	14.0 cm^{3}/g

These values lie significantly lower in comparison to classical explosives like TNT or RDX, and also to acetone peroxide. Dilute solutions (< 3%) of the compound in dichloromethane can be handled safely.

== Uses ==
Despite its explosive character, iodine azide has many practical uses in chemical synthesis. Similar to bromine azide, it can add across an alkene double bond via both ionic and radical mechanisms, giving anti stereoselectivity. Addition of IN_{3} to an alkene followed by reduction with lithium aluminium hydride is a convenient method of aziridine synthesis. Azirines can also be synthesized from the addition product by adding base to eliminate HI, giving a vinyl azide CH_{2}=CHN_{3} which undergoes thermolysis to form an azirine. Further radical modes of reactivity include radical substitutions on weak C-H bonds to form α‐azido ethers, benzal acetals, and aldehydes, and the conversion of aldehydes to acyl azides.
