= Chlorine azide =

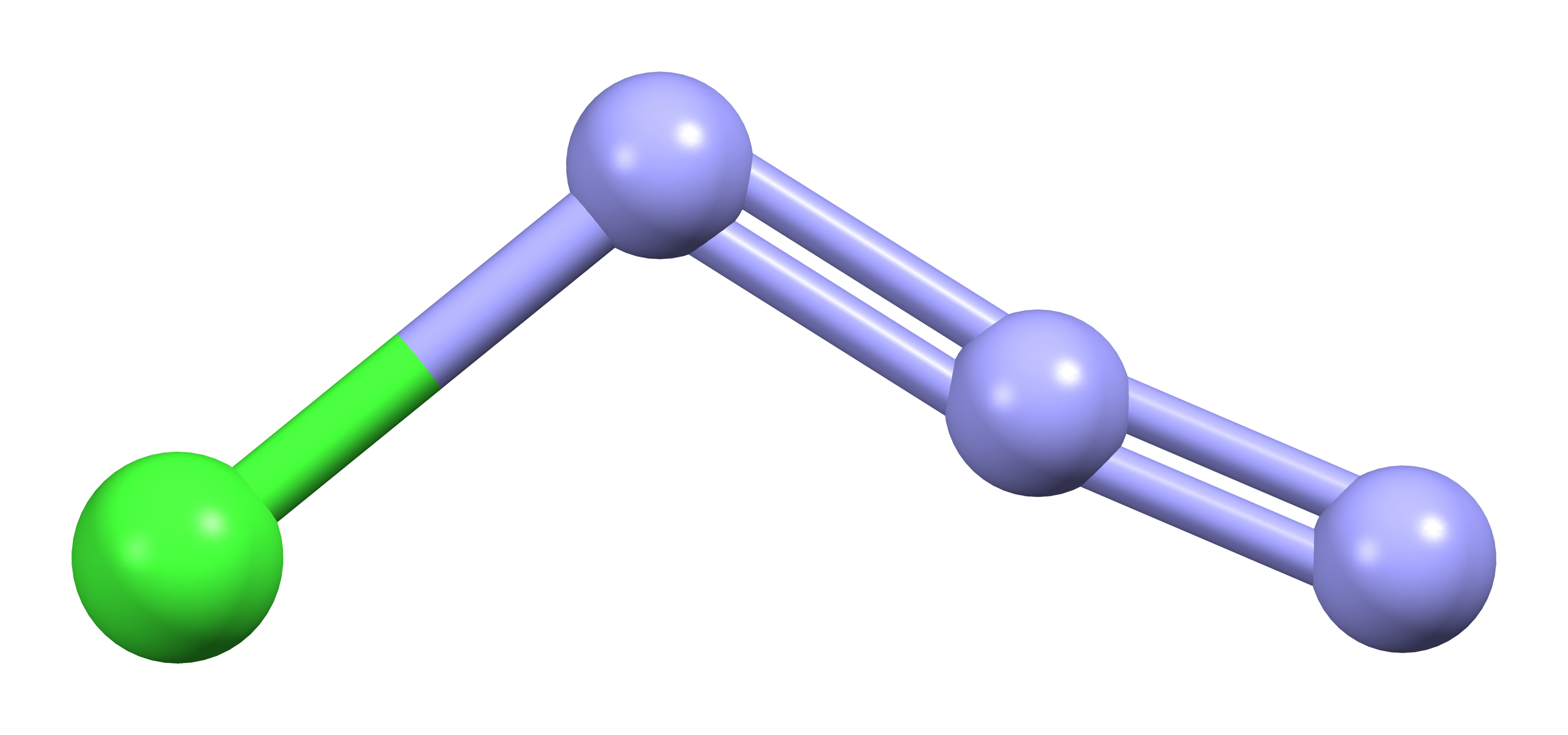

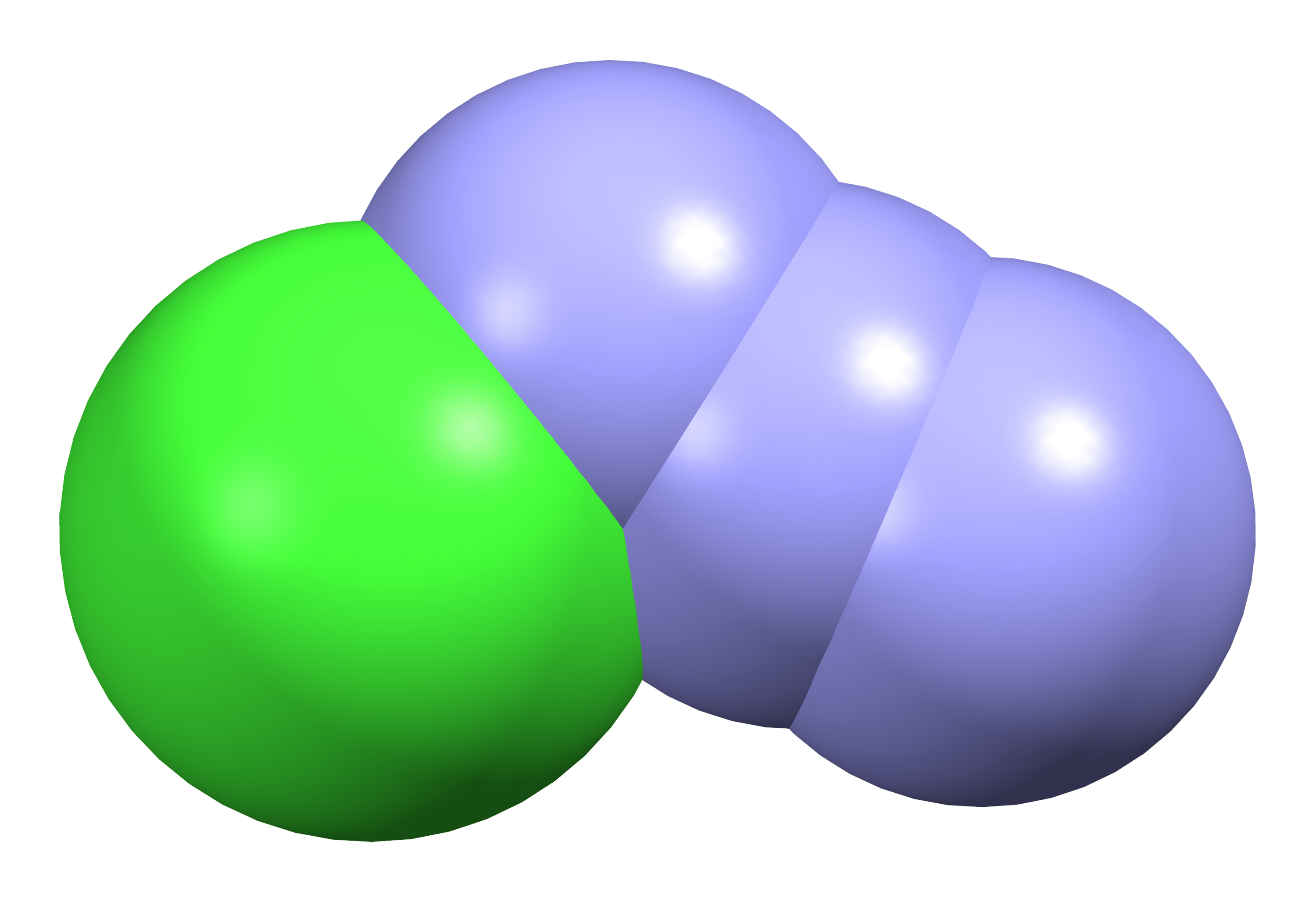

Names
- IUPAC name Chlorine azide

Identifiers
CAS Number	13973-88-1
3D model (JSmol)	Interactive image
ChemSpider	55609
PubChem CID	61708
CompTox Dashboard (EPA)	DTXSID10161156
- InChI: InChI=1S/ClN3/c1-3-4-2 Key: ZGNIYAPHJAPRMA-UHFFFAOYSA-N
- SMILES: [N-]=[N+]=NCl

Properties
Chemical formula	ClN_{3}
Molar mass	77.4731 g/mol
Appearance	Yellow-orange liquid; colorless gas
Melting point	−100 °C (−148 °F; 173 K)
Boiling point	−15 °C (5 °F; 258 K)
Solubility	Soluble in butane, pentane, benzene, methanol, ethanol, diethyl ether, acetone, chloroform, carbon tetrachloride, and carbon disulfide; slightly soluble in water

Structure
Crystal structure	orthorhombic
Space group	Cmc 2_{1}, No. 36

Explosive data
Shock sensitivity	Extreme
Friction sensitivity	Extreme

Hazards
- Occupational safety and health (OHS/OSH)
Main hazards	Extremely sensitive explosive
NFPA 704 (fire diamond)	0 4

Related compounds
Related compounds	Hydrazoic acid Fluorine azide Bromine azide Iodine azide
- Except where otherwise noted, data are given for materials in their standard state (at 25 °C [77 °F], 100 kPa). verify (what is ?) Infobox references

Chlorine azide (ClN_{3}) is an inorganic compound that was discovered in 1908 by Friedrich Raschig. Concentrated ClN_{3} is notoriously unstable and may spontaneously detonate at any temperature.

== Preparation and reactions ==
Chlorine azide is prepared by passing chlorine gas over silver azide, or by an addition of acetic acid to a solution of sodium hypochlorite and sodium azide.

Chlorine azide further reacts with silver azide to produce a very unstable allotrope of nitrogen, hexanitrogen (N_{6}), which decomposes to dinitrogen above 80 K (−193.2 °C; −315.7 °F).

== Explosive characteristics ==
Chlorine azide is extremely sensitive. It may explode, sometimes even without apparent provocation; it is thus too sensitive to be used commercially unless first diluted in solution. Chlorine azide reacts explosively with 1,3-butadiene, ethane, ethene, methane, propane, phosphorus, silver azide, and sodium. On contact with acid, chlorine azide decomposes, evolving toxic and corrosive hydrogen chloride gas.

== Regulatory information ==
Its shipment is subject to strict reporting requirements and regulations by the US Department of Transportation.
