= Fluorine azide =

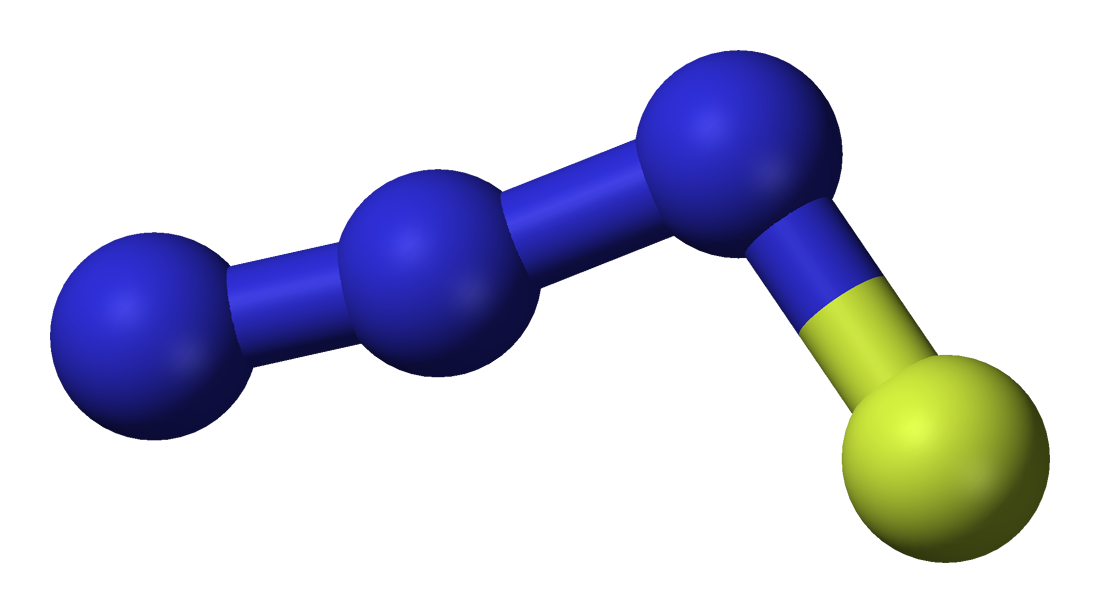

Names
- Other names triazadienyl fluoride

Identifiers
CAS Number	14986-60-8
3D model (JSmol)	Interactive image
ChemSpider	10328964
PubChem CID	23235952
CompTox Dashboard (EPA)	DTXSID40631418
- InChI: InChI=1S/FN3/c1-3-4-2 Key: AJXWEJAGUZJGRI-UHFFFAOYSA-N
- SMILES: [N-]=[N+]=NF

Properties
Chemical formula	FN_{3}
Molar mass	61.019 g/mol
Appearance	Yellow-green gas
Density	1.3 g/cm^{3}
Melting point	−139 °C (−218 °F; 134 K)
Boiling point	−30 °C (−22 °F; 243 K)

Explosive data
Shock sensitivity	Extreme
Friction sensitivity	Extreme

Hazards
- Occupational safety and health (OHS/OSH)
Main hazards	Extremely sensitive explosive
NFPA 704 (fire diamond)	0 4

Related compounds
Other cations	Hydrazoic acid Chlorine azide Bromine azide Iodine azide
- Except where otherwise noted, data are given for materials in their standard state (at 25 °C [77 °F], 100 kPa). Infobox references

Fluorine azide or triazadienyl fluoride is a yellow green gas composed of nitrogen and fluorine with formula FN_{3}. Its properties resemble those of ClN_{3}, BrN_{3}, and IN_{3}. The bond between the fluorine atom and the nitrogen is very weak, leading to this substance being very unstable and prone to explosion. Calculations show the F–N–N angle to be around 102° with a straight line of 3 nitrogen atoms.

It was first made by John F. Haller in 1942.

== Reactions ==
Fluorine azide can be made by reacting hydrazoic acid or sodium azide, with fluorine gas.

HN_{3} + F_{2} → N_{3}F + HF
NaN_{3} + F_{2} → N_{3}F + NaF

Fluorine azide decomposes without explosion at normal temperatures to make dinitrogen difluoride:

2 FN_{3} → N_{2}F_{2} + 2 N_{2}.

At higher temperatures such as 1000 °C fluorine azide breaks up into nitrogen monofluoride radical:

FN_{3} → NF + N_{2}

The FN itself dimerizes on cooling.

2 NF → N_{2}F_{2}

Solid or liquid FN_{3} can explode, releasing a large amount of energy. A thin film burns at the rate of 1.6 km/s. Due to the explosion hazard, only very small quantities of this substance should be handled at a time.

FN_{3} adducts can be formed with the Lewis acids boron trifluoride (BF_{3}) and arsenic pentafluoride (AsF_{5}) at -196 °C. These molecules bond with the first nitrogen atom from the fluorine.

== Properties ==
=== Spectroscopy ===
Parameter	Value	Unit
A	48131.448	MHz
B	5713.266	MHz
C	5095.276	MHz
μ_{a}	1.1	
μ_{b}	0.7	

=== Shape ===
Distances between atoms are F–N 0.1444 nm, FN=NN 0.1253 nm and FNN=N 0.1132 nm.

=== Physical ===
FN_{3} adsorbs on to solid surfaces of potassium fluoride, but not onto lithium fluoride or sodium fluoride. This property was being investigated so that FN_{3} could boost the energy of solid propellants.

The ultraviolet photoelectric spectrum shows ionisation peaks at 11.01, 13,72, 15.6, 15.9, 16.67, 18.2, and 19.7 eV. Respectively these are assigned to the orbitals: π, n_{N} or n_{F}, n_{F}, π_{F}, n_{N} or σ, π and σ.
