= Bromine azide =

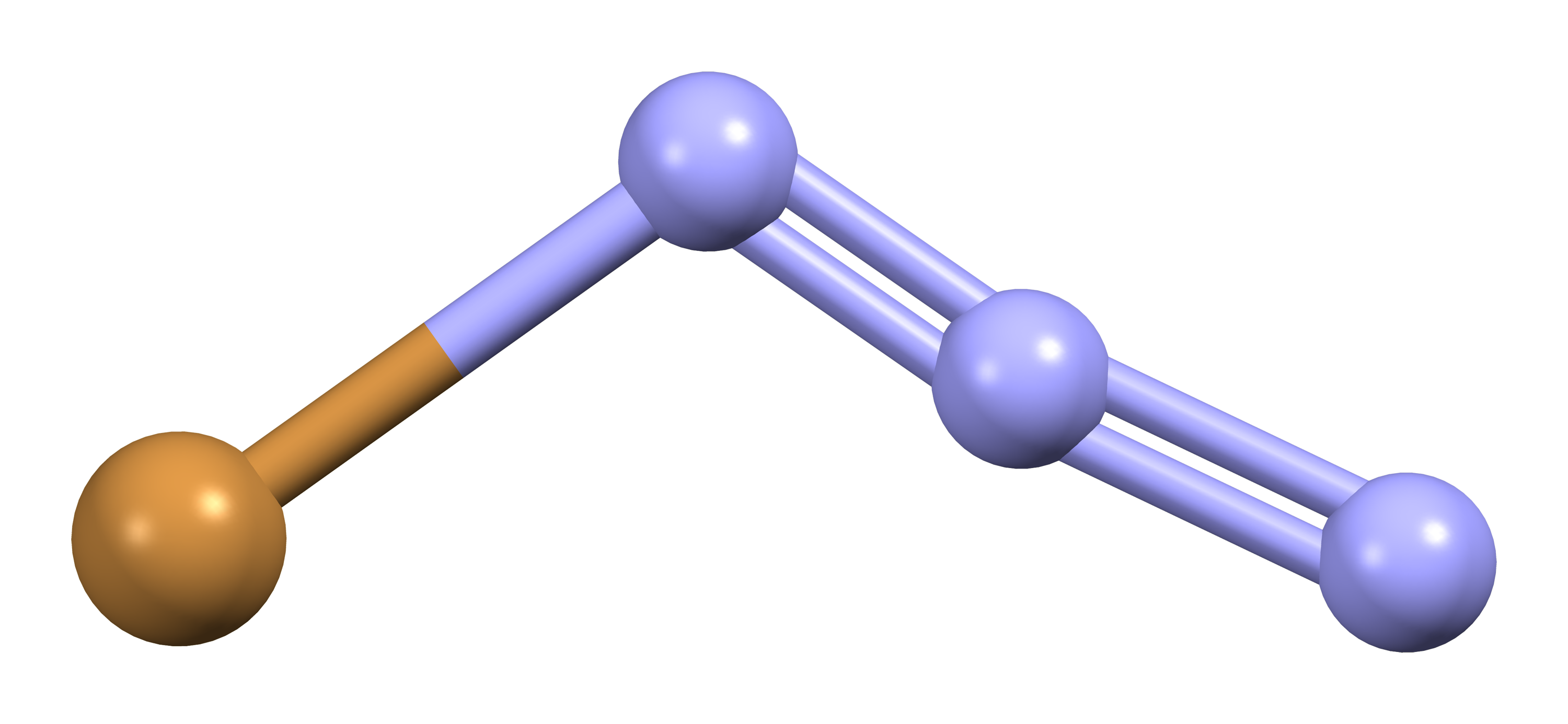

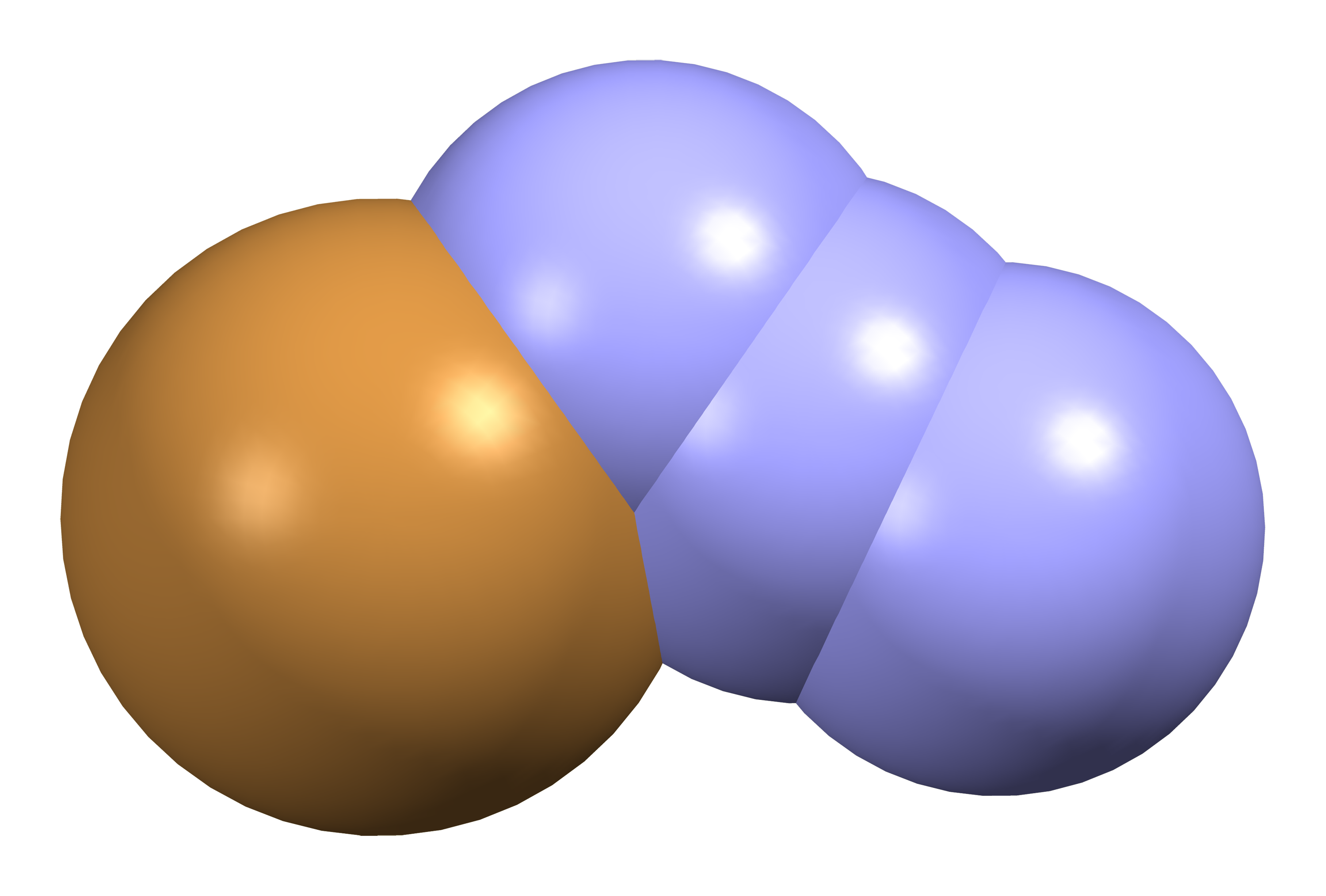

Names
- IUPAC name Bromine azide
- Other names Bromo azide, Azidobromide

Identifiers
CAS Number	13973-87-0
3D model (JSmol)	Interactive image; Interactive image
ChemSpider	24562
PubChem CID	26364
CompTox Dashboard (EPA)	DTXSID50161155
- InChI: InChI=1S/BrN3/c1-3-4-2 Key: KFCUPNHUPHDVJC-UHFFFAOYSA-N; InChI=1/BrN3/c1-3-4-2 Key: KFCUPNHUPHDVJC-UHFFFAOYAE
- SMILES: [N-]=[N+]=N\Br; [N-]=[N+]=NBr

Properties
Chemical formula	BrN_{3}
Molar mass	121.924 g/mol
Appearance	Red liquid
Density	Unknown
Melting point	−45 °C (−49 °F; 228 K)
Boiling point	Unknown, decomposes explosively at high temperature

Structure
Crystal structure	tetragonal
Space group	I4̅cd
Formula units (Z)	16

Hazards
- Occupational safety and health (OHS/OSH)
Main hazards	Highly reactive, sensitive and poisonous explosive, detonates on contact with arsenic, alkali metals, silver foil, and allotropes of phosphorus. It has a hazard class of 1.1A.
- GHS labelling
Pictograms	(GHS01: Explosive) (GHS06: Toxic) (GHS09: Environmental hazard) (GHS05: Corrosive) (GHS08: Health hazard)

Related compounds
Related compounds	Hydrazoic acid Fluorine azide Chlorine azide Iodine azide
- Except where otherwise noted, data are given for materials in their standard state (at 25 °C [77 °F], 100 kPa). Infobox references

Bromine azide is an explosive inorganic compound with the formula BrN_{3}. It has been described as a crystal or a red liquid at room temperature. It is highly sensitive to small variations in temperature and pressure, with explosions occurring at Δp (pressure change) ≥ 0.05 Torr upon crystallization, thus extreme caution must be observed when working with this chemical.

== Preparation ==
Bromine azide may be prepared by the reaction of sodium azide with Br_{2}. This reaction forms bromine azide and sodium bromide:

NaN_{3} + Br_{2} → BrN_{3} + NaBr

== Structure ==
The high sensitivity of bromine azide has led to difficulty in discerning its crystal structure. Despite this, a crystal structure of bromine azide has been obtained using a miniature zone-melting procedure with focused infrared laser radiation. In contrast to IN_{3}, which forms an endless chain-like structure upon crystallization, BrN_{3} forms a helical structure. Each molecule adopts a trans-bent structure, which is also found in the gas phase.

== Reactions ==
Bromium azide adds to alkenes both through ionic and free-radical addition, each giving an opposite orientation in the products. The ionic addition occurs stereospecifically in trans. Reactions involving bromine azide are difficult to work with. The molecule is very reactive and is known to explode easily. This makes it a key reagent in explosives. Photochemistry experiments with bromine azide have found that UV photolysis of a small sample of bromine azide resulted in dissociation of the entire sample, making it unstable. Similar samples with azide molecules did not show such an effect. This shows bromine azide's unstable tendencies in that even in the presence of sunlight, bromine azide will be a reactive molecule.

Bromine azide further reacts with silver azide to produce a very unstable allotrope of nitrogen, hexanitrogen (N_{6}), which decomposes to dinitrogen above 80 K (−193.2 °C; −315.7 °F).

Detonation of bromine azide upon slight agitation

== Safety ==
Great care must be taken when handling bromine azide as it is potentially toxic and is able to explode under various conditions. Concentrated solutions in organic solvents may also explode. The liquid explodes on contact with arsenic, sodium, silver foil, or phosphorus. When heated to decomposition it emits highly toxic fumes of bromine and explodes. The amount of compound used during experimentation should be limited to 2 mmol. It also poses a potential moderate fire hazard in the form of vapor by chemical reaction. It is also a powerful oxidant.

It has been banned from transport in the United States by the US Department of Transportation.
