= Orthonitrate =

Names
- IUPAC name Orthonitrate
- Other names: Tetraoxidoazanium; Tetraoxonitrate(3-)

Identifiers
CAS Number	54991-46-7
3D model (JSmol)	Interactive image
PubChem CID	sodium salt: 160703908
CompTox Dashboard (EPA)	DTXSID401028136
- InChI: InChI=1S/NO4/c2-1(3,4)5/q-3 Key: QKSQKFHZSYXUGK-UHFFFAOYSA-N
- SMILES: [N+]([O-])([O-])([O-])[O-]

Properties
Chemical formula	NO_{4}^{3−}
Molar mass	78.005 g·mol^{−1}
Conjugate acid	Orthonitric acid
- Except where otherwise noted, data are given for materials in their standard state (at 25 °C [77 °F], 100 kPa). Infobox references

Orthonitrate is a tetrahedral anion of nitrogen with the formula NO_{4}^{3−}. It was first identified in 1977 and is currently known in only two compounds, sodium orthonitrate (Na_{3}NO_{4}) and potassium orthonitrate (K_{3}NO_{4}). The corresponding oxoacid, orthonitric acid (H_{3}NO_{4}), is hypothetical and has never been observed. Sodium and potassium orthonitrate can be prepared by fusion of the nitrate and metal oxide under high temperatures and ideally high pressures (several GPa).

NaNO_{3} + Na_{2}O → Na_{3}NO_{4} (300 °C for 3 days)

The resulting orthonitrates are white solids which are extremely sensitive to moisture and CO_{2}, decomposing within minutes to hydroxides, carbonates, and nitrates upon exposure to air.

Na_{3}NO_{4} + CO_{2} → NaNO_{3} + Na_{2}CO_{3}
Na_{3}NO_{4} + H_{2}O → NaNO_{3} + 2 NaOH

The orthonitrate ion is tetrahedral with N–O bond lengths of 139 pm, which is unexpectedly short (cf. hydroxylamine, ρ(N–O) = 145 pm), indicating that polar interactions play an important role in shortening the bond. This short bond length parallels that of hypervalent oxyanions containing third-row elements like PO_{4}^{3−} and SO_{4}^{2−}, for which pπ–dπ bonding was previously proposed as the explanation for the short bond length. Since pπ–dπ bonding is not plausible for orthonitrate (the 3d atomic orbitals of nitrogen are much too high in energy relative to the ground state 2p valence orbitals), the shortness of the N–O bond in orthonitrate indicates that, contrary to earlier belief, invocation of pπ–dπ bonding is not necessary for explaining the shortened bond lengths of these heavier anions. (Modern quantum chemical calculations suggest that d orbitals play at most a marginal role in the bonding of so-called hypervalent molecules.)

The commonly accepted Lewis structure of orthonitrate shows only single bonds, in accordance with the lack of d orbitals on N available, even in principle, for the formation of bonds beyond an octet. However, under certain novel interpretations of bond order and hypervalence that have yet to receive general acceptance, a Lewis structure with an N–O double bond has been argued to be correct.

== Other nitrogen oxyanions ==
- nitrate, NO_{3}^{−}
- nitrite, NO_{2}^{−}
