= Main group azido compounds =

Main group azido compounds are chemical compounds consisting of azide, N_{3}^{−} bonded to a main group element.

Azido compounds are often shock sensitive. Their sensitivity correlates with the amount of ionic or covalent character the azide-element bond has, with ionic character being far more stable than covalent character. Compounds such as sodium azide – which has ionic character – tend to be less sensitive, Such compounds are relevant to high-energy-density matter. although sodium azide is, ironically, the principal gas-forming component of air bags. It is the most important azide from a commercial perspective. The other commercially important azide is the lead derivative, which is of interest because of its explosive properties.

== Synthesis ==
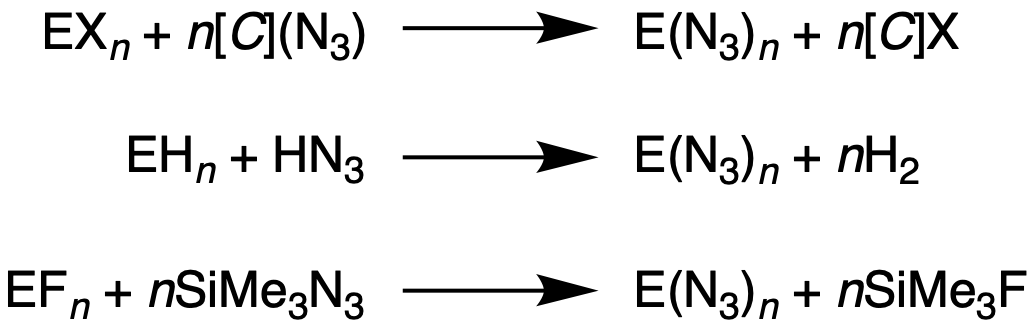
Popular synthetic routes to homoleptic azido compounds (E = element).

Azido compounds compounds can often be prepared by salt metathesis between sodium azide or silver azide and the main group chloride. Another route involves the reactions hydrazoic acid HN_{3} with main group compounds containing basic ligands (alkyls, alkoxides, amides, etc.). Yet another route entails the reaction of trimethylsilyl azide with the main group fluoride, a method that exploits the stability and volatility of trimethylsilyl fluoride.

== Group 1 (alkali metal) ==
Sodium azide is prepared by the reaction of sodium amide with nitrous oxide. This route is known as the "Wislicenus process":

2 NaNH_{2} + N_{2}O → NaN_{3} + NaOH + NH_{3}

Hundreds of tons of azides are prepared in this way annually. KN_{3} is prepared by treating potassium carbonate with hydrazoic acid. lithium and rubidium azide can be prepared by treating solutions of their respective sulfates with barium azide.

Ba(N_{3})_{2} + Li_{2}SO_{4} → 2 LiN_{3} + BaSO_{4}

== Group 2 (alkaline earth) ==
Barium azide, Ba(N_{3})_{2}, precipitates from upon addition of sodium azide to an aqueous solution of barium bromide.

== Group 13 ==
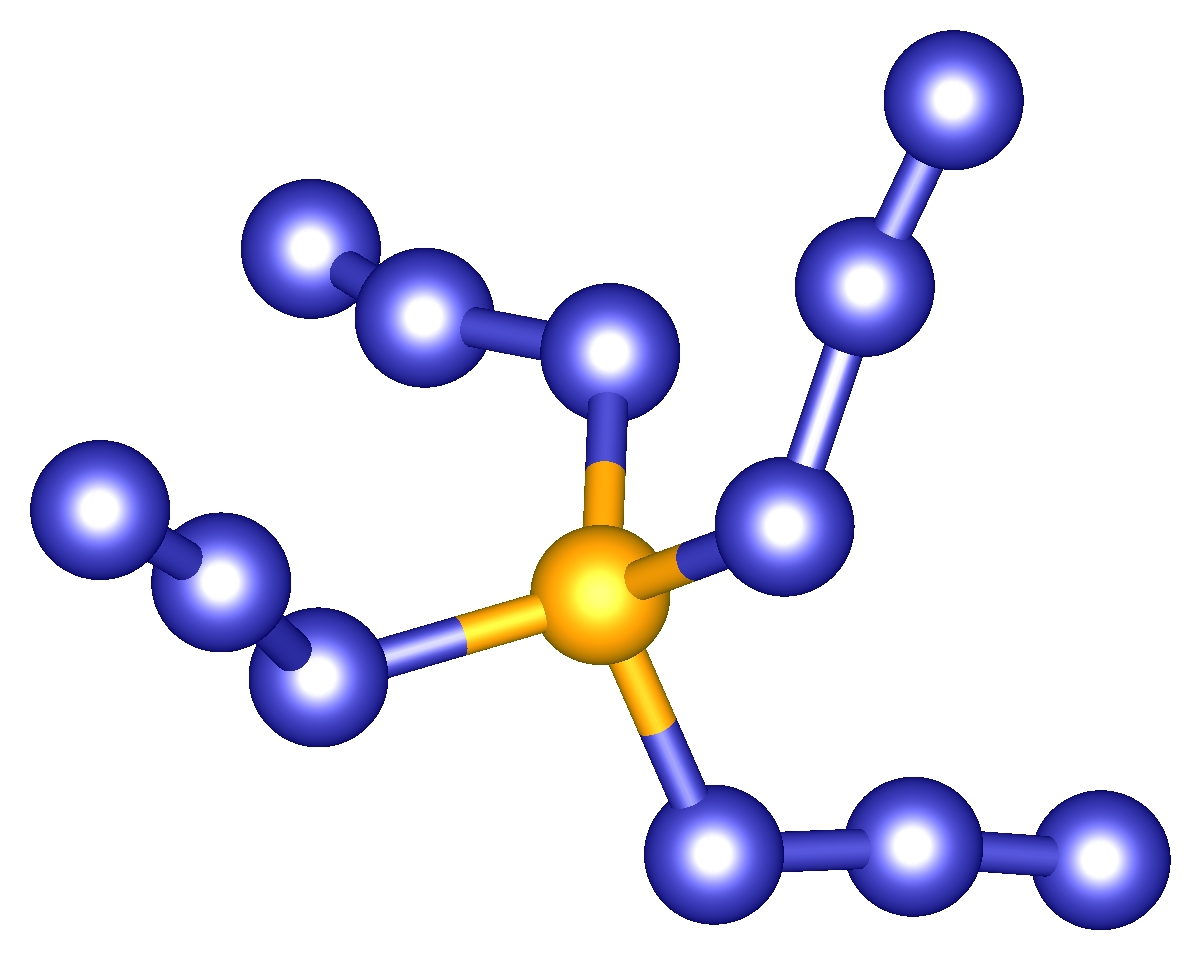
Structure of [B(N_{3})_{4}]^{−}.

Boron triazide, B(N_{3})_{3}, was first prepared by the addition of diborane to an ethereal solution of HN_{3} . The compound is relatively volatile and undergoes explosive decomposition above -35°C. In contrast, aluminum azide Al(N_{3})_{3} is relatively stable and will only deflagrate in a match test. It decomposes hydrolytically within minutes when exposed to atmospheric moisture. Al(N_{3})_{3} has some synthetic applications: when generated in situ, it react with β-unsaturated cyano esters to form tetrazoles in bulk scale. Gas phase reactions of AlMe_{3} and HN_{3} have been reported to form Al(N_{3})_{3}. However, at room temperature, this compound decomposes to AlN_{2} and AlN leading to the suggestion that Al(N_{3})_{3} can be used to prepare AlN.

Owing to the interest in GaN as a semiconductor, group 13 azido chemistry is dominated by the gallium azides. Na[Ga(N_{3})_{4}] is a polymer. This compound gives donor stabilized gallium triazides Ga(N_{3})_{3}L_{m} which upon heating decompose to the polymeric [Ga(N_{3})_{3}]_{∞} and produces GaN after detonation. Ga(N_{3})_{3} can readily be analyzed as its tetraphosphonium salt [PPh_{4}]_{2}[Ga(N_{3})_{5}]. The increased ionicity of the azido ligands and the presence of the two large counterions which diminish shock propagation make the compound significantly less sensitive.

The indium azide In(N_{3})_{3} can be prepared via the fluoride exchange route. Tetraphosphonium salt [PPh_{4}]_{3}[In(N_{3})_{6}] is also known.

Thallium (I) azide TlN_{3} is shock sensitive but less so than related mercury or lead azides. TlN_{3} is one of the few azides that melts before it explodes. Tetraphenylphosphonium salt [PPh_{4}]_{3}[Tl(N_{3})_{6}] has been crystallized.

== Group 14 ==
Diazido- and triazidomethane can be prepared via simple nucleophilic substitution of methylene chloride or bromoform respectively with the azide ion on quaternary ammonia resin. Solutions greater than 70% purity of diazidomethane have a tendency to explode with any minor mechanical disturbance such as pipetting. Tetraazidomethane C(N_{3})_{4} cannot be prepared from carbontetrahalides and instead can be obtained via a reaction of trichloroacetonitrile Cl_{3}CCN with NaN_{3} albeit in relatively low yields. Yields can be significantly improved by reacting triazidomethylium hexachloroantimonate [C(N_{3})_{3}][SbCl_{6}]with sodium or lithium azide LiN_{3}; this route carries a high risk of accidental detonation. In general, pure tetraazidomethane should be avoided, and even solutions should not be handled manually. The compound can explode randomly at any time without apparent provocation and a singular drop is capable of shattering glass and vacuum Dewars.

Si(N_{3})_{4} can be prepared from SiCl_{4} and NaN_{3}. This method, however, also produces various silicon chloroazides which can be avoided by prolonging reaction times. Additionally, unlike the boron and aluminum azides, Si(N_{3})_{4} cannot be obtained via the reaction between SiH_{4} and HN_{3}. The hexaazidosicalte salt [(Ph_{3}P)_{2}N]_{2}[Si(N_{3})_{6}] adopts an octahedral molecular geometry, a very rare case of silicon in an N_{6} environment.

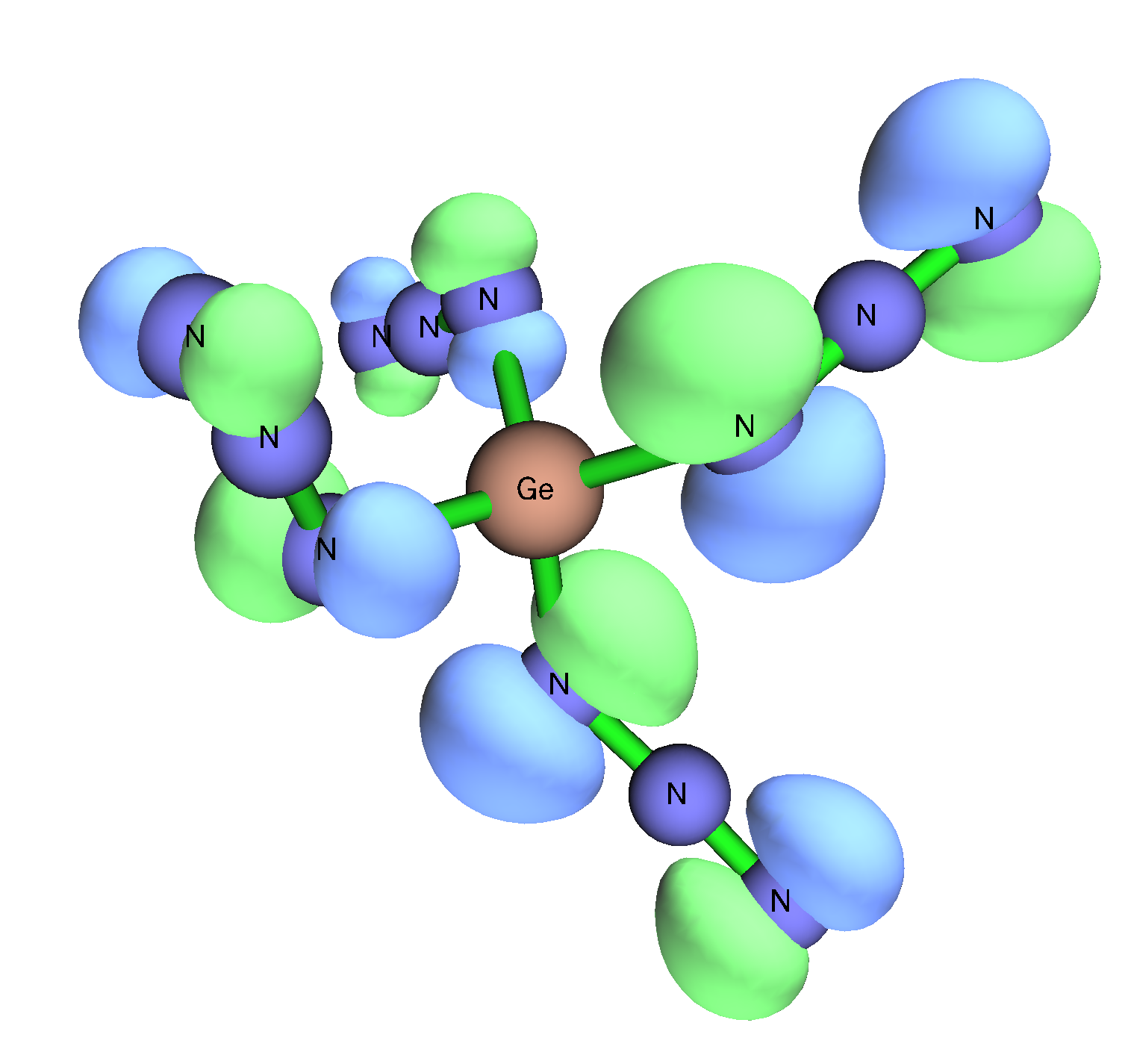
Highest Occupied Molecular Orbital (HOMO) of Ge(N_{3})_{4}

Ge(N_{3})_{4} has not been confirmed. The hexaazido germanate Na_{2}[Ge(N_{3})_{6}] has been crystallized. The presence of a weakly coordinating counterion such as tetraphenylarsonium enables the formation of low valent germanates from the trichloride anion to form the germanium (II) [Ge(N_{3})_{3}]^{−} that will not convert to the germanium (IV) upon further exposure to NaN_{3}, but the low valent salts are very prone to oxidation.

Adducts of Sn(N_{3})_{4} are known with various ancillary ligands. Reactions with SnCl_{4} and NaN_{3} lead s to the hexaazide Na_{2}Sn(N_{3})_{6}. The salt is only slightly water sensitive and deflagrates in a flame test. Azides of Sn(II) exist in the form of salts of [Sn(N_{3})_{3}]^{−}. Like the analogous germanates, they are very sensitive compounds. They tend to dimerize.

Lead azide is one of the most studied azides owing to its use as a primary explosive. Uniquely it is the only group 14 azide that is more prevalent in its divalent Pb^{2+} form. The α, β, γ, and ∂ polymorphs exist but the α form is the only one that finds extensive technical applications. Homoleptic azides of Pb(IV) exist but like the tin versions Pb(N_{3})_{4} is not a stable compound, and attempts to synthesize it from PbO_{2} and HN_{3} form red needles that quickly explode and decompose to Pb(N_{3})_{2}. The compound can however be isolated as the [Pb(N_{3})_{6}]^{2-} ions with large organic cations to yield a nonexplosive compound.

== Group 15 ==
In the general sense, azides of group 15 elements tend to resemble their chlorides but with higher volatility and less thermostability. Nitrogen rich compounds such as N(N_{3})_{3} have not yet been made.

Phosphorus triazide P(N_{3})_{3} is prepared by the reaction of NaN_{3} and PCl_{3}. The existence of P(N_{3})_{5} has not yet been confirmed. Phosphorus(V) azides are restricted to [P(N_{3})_{4}]^{+}[SbCl_{6}]^{−} from PCl_{3} or the sodium salt Na[P(N_{3})_{6}] from PCl_{5}.

As(N_{3})_{3} can be prepared from the fluoride exchange route, and the resulting crystal structure has EO bridging of two of the azido groups, giving a coordination number of 7 and an infinite zig-zag chain structure. However, the solution state ^{14}N NMR of As(N_{3})_{3} confirms that this compounds are in fact monomeric in solution, and the lone pair of arsenic is calculated to be sterically active as evidenced by the optimized gas phase geometry and contour plot of the total electron density. Unlike phosphorus, the parent arsenic(V) azide has been isolated as As(N_{3})_{5} and exists as a yellow liquid. The entire series of arsenic azido ions have been reported, [As(N_{3})_{4}]^{−}, [As(N_{3})_{4}]^{+}, and [As(N_{3})_{6}]^{−}. The cationic species have the shortest As-N and N_{β}-N_{γ} distance whereas the anionic ones tend to have much longer As-N distances and therefore partially explains why the cationic compounds tend to be much more explosive.

The antimony(III) azide Sb(N_{3})_{3} is prepared in a similar manner to the arsenic one and has a similar structure with the exception that all three of azido ligands are participating in EO bridging and produce a highly symmetrical sheet. Sb(N_{5})_{5} exists as a highly unstable compound and cannot be handled at ambient temperatures without explosion. The series of antimony azide salts [Sb(N_{3})_{4}]^{−}, [Sb(N_{3})_{4}]^{+}, and [Sb(N_{3})_{6}]^{−} are known and have similar trends to the arsenic ones.

Binary bismuth azides remained elusive until 2010 when clean Bi(N_{3})_{3} was isolated using the fluoride exchange route. The series of bismuth (III) ions [Bi(N_{3})_{4}]^{−}, [Bi(N_{3})_{5}]^{2-}, and [Bi(N_{3})_{6}]^{3-} have been synthesized and structurally characterized. The bismuth lone pair is sterically active in all of the ions. In the solid state, bismuth structures tend to differ widely from their lighter group 15 counterparts since bismuth can accommodate larger coordination numbers, and the structures are based on Bi_{2}N_{2} parallelogram with a coordination number of 8. Attempts at making Bi(V) compounds result in reduction to Bi(III) by N_{3}^{−}.

== Group 16 ==
Oxygen and sulfur diazides have not been confirmed. sulfuryl azide SO_{2}(N_{3})_{2} has been fully characterized.

The series of binary selenium azides Se(N_{3})_{4}, [Se(N_{3})_{5}]^{−}, and [Se(N_{3})_{6}]^{2-} have been prepared via the fluoride exchange route. The neutral Se(N_{3})_{4} detonate even at -64°Cwithout provocation. Therefore, solid state characterization is restricted to the ions, and show that the azido groups have strong covalent character. The [Se(N_{3})_{6}]^{2-} ion crystalizes with S_{6} symmetry. Apparently the lone pair is not sterically active.

The tellurium (IV) azides [Te(N_{3})_{3}]^{+}, Te(N_{3})_{4}, [Te(N_{3})_{5}]^{−}, and [Te(N_{3})_{6}]^{2-} were prepared by reduction of the TeF_{6} via the fluoride exchange route. Te(N_{3})_{4} is a very sensitive compound, but related salts are less shock sensitive. Unlike the above selenium salt, the lone pair in the tellurium dianion [Te(N_{3})_{6}]^{2-} is sterically active and therefore forces a distorted pseudo pentagonal bipyramidal structure.

== Group 17 ==
The four halogen azides are known: FN_{3}, ClN_{3}, BrN_{3}, and IN_{3}. The gas phase reaction between dilute F_{2} and HN_{3} produces FN_{3}. Chlorine azide, also a gas, can be produced from passing chlorine gas through a solution of NaN_{3}. Chlorine azide tends to explode spontaneously even at reduced temperatures. Bromine azide is a liquid but is also treacherous. BrN_{3} hydrolyzes readily. Similarly, iodine azide, also moisture sensitive, can be made from ICl and solid AgN_{3}. However, since AgN_{3} can only be handled safely when moist, drying agent is normally added to the reaction mixture to prevent hydrolysis of the final product. Both BrN_{3} and IN_{3} find use in synthesis a convenient way to make azidiridines and azirines. The chlorine, bromine, and iodine azides have been characterized in the solid state.

== See also ==
- Fluorosulfonyl azide
- Transition metal azide complex
