= Ammonium azide =

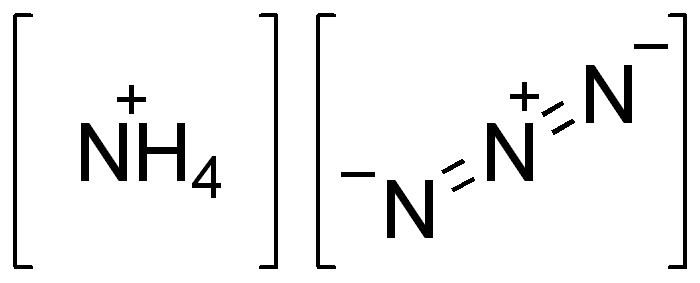

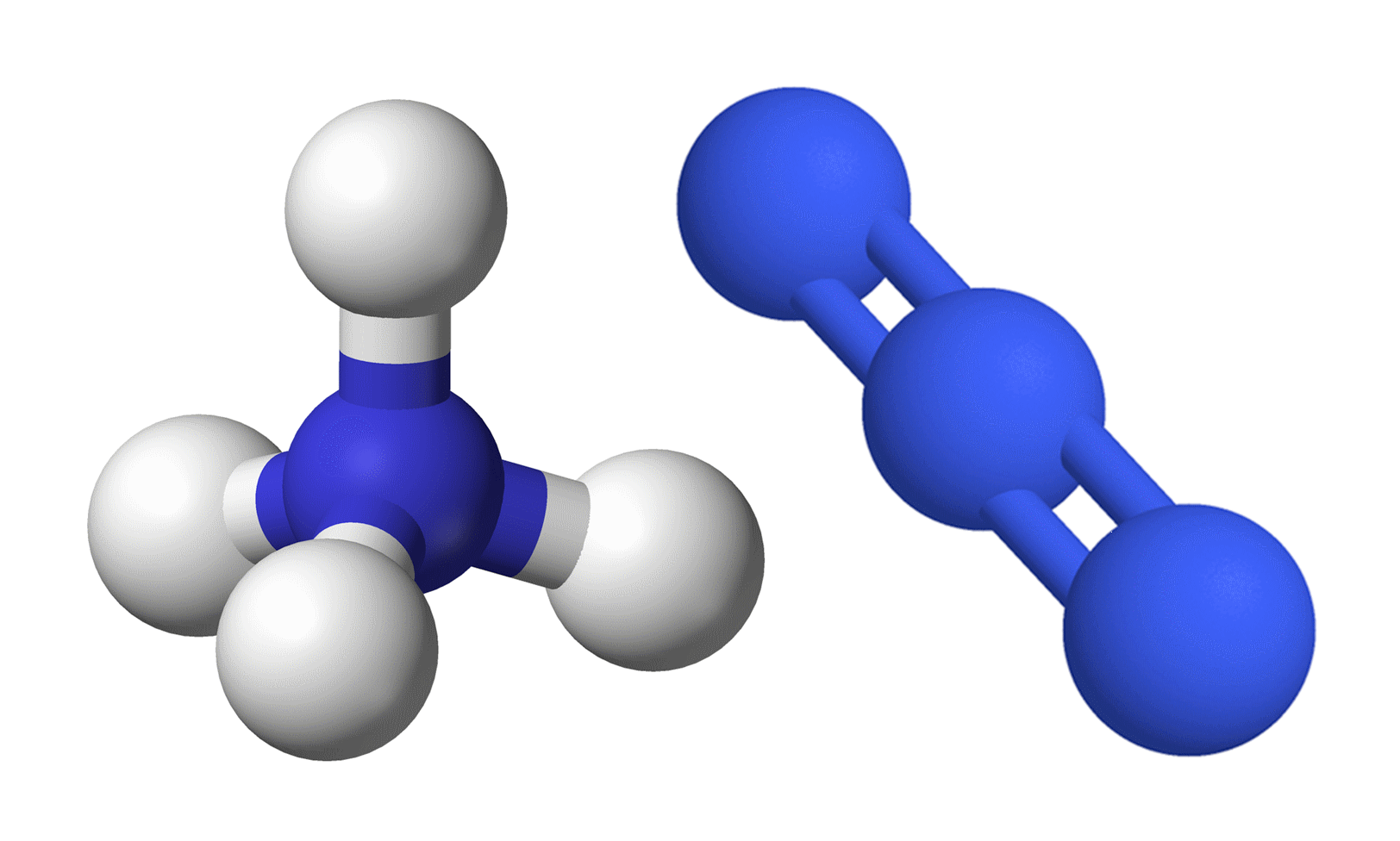
- Ball-and-stick model of ammonium azide

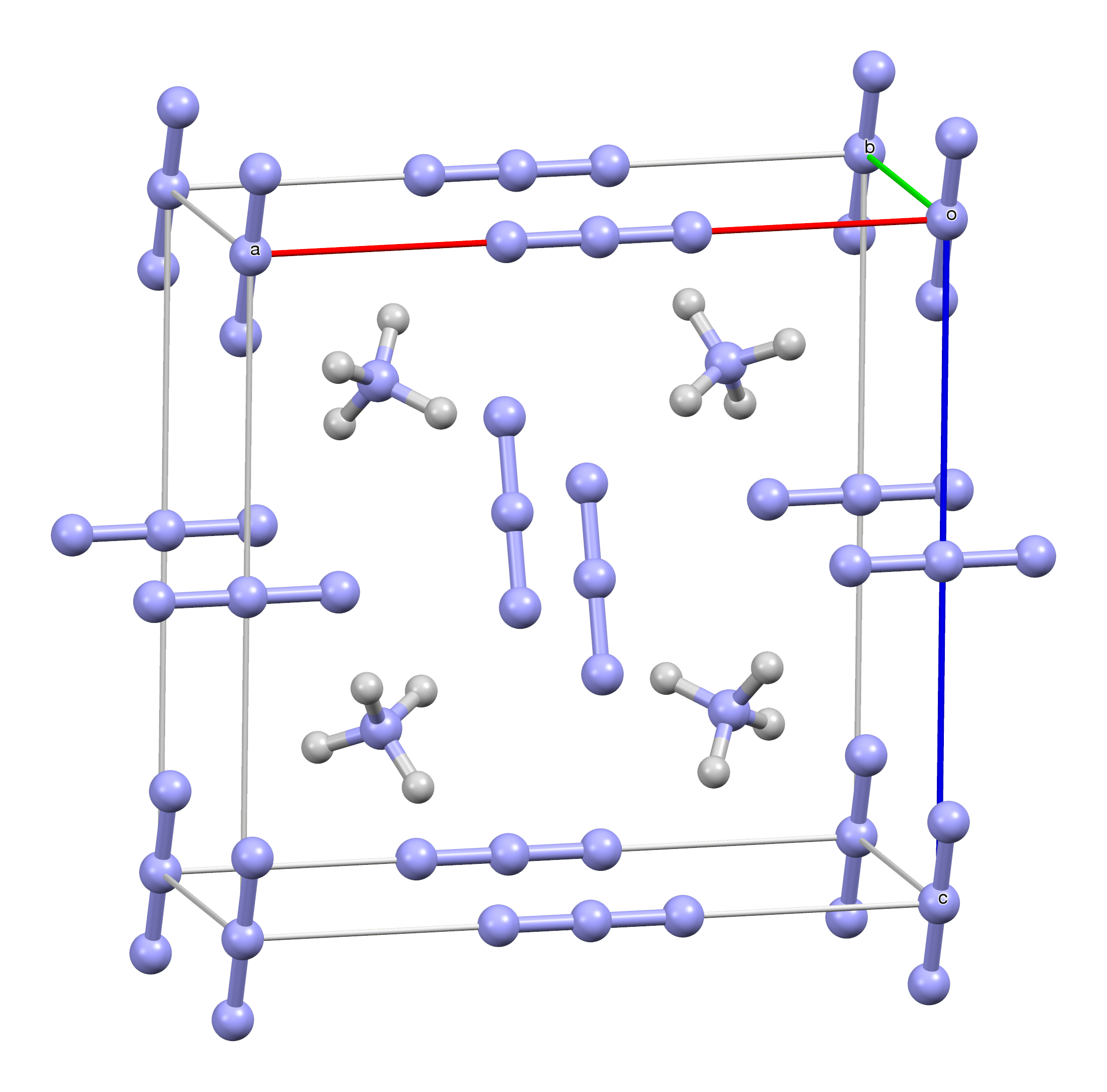

Names
- IUPAC name Ammonium azide
- Other names Ammonium trinitride

Identifiers
CAS Number	12164-94-2
3D model (JSmol)	Interactive image
ChemSpider	8488511
ECHA InfoCard	100.032.093
EC Number	235-315-4
PubChem CID	61555
CompTox Dashboard (EPA)	DTXSID10923913
- InChI: InChI=1S/HN3.H3N/c1-3-2;/h1H;1H3 Key: MXZUDRZKSUUQRR-UHFFFAOYSA-N
- SMILES: [NH+4].[N-]=[N+]=[N-]

Properties
Chemical formula	[NH_{4}]N_{3}
Molar mass	60.060 g·mol^{−1}
Appearance	Colorless or white crystalline solid
Odor	Odorless
Density	1.3459 g/cm^{3}
Melting point	160 °C (320 °F; 433 K)
Boiling point	400 °C (752 °F; 673 K) (decomposes)
Solubility in water	20.2 g/100 mL (30 °C)
Solubility	Insoluble in diethyl ether and benzene
Solubility in methanol	3.3 g/100 mL (20 °C)
Solubility in ethanol	1.06 g/100 mL (20 °C)

Structure
Crystal structure	Orthorhombic
Space group	P_{man}
Lattice constant	a = 8.930, b = 8.642, c = 3.800
Formula units (Z)	4

Thermochemistry
Std molar entropy (S^{⦵}_{298})	112.5 J/(mol·K)
Std enthalpy of formation (Δ_{f}H^{⦵}_{298})	115.5 kJ/mol
Gibbs free energy (Δ_{f}G^{⦵})	274.2 kJ/mol

Hazards
- Occupational safety and health (OHS/OSH)
Main hazards	Very toxic, explosive

Related compounds
Other anions	Ammonium nitrate; Ammonium nitrite; Ammonium cyanide; Ammonium sulfamate; Ammonium carbamate
Other cations	Lithium azide; Sodium azide; Potassium azide; Rubidium azide; Caesium azide; Silver azide
Related compounds	Ammonia; Hydrazoic acid; Nitrosyl azide; Chlorine azide
- Except where otherwise noted, data are given for materials in their standard state (at 25 °C [77 °F], 100 kPa). verify (what is ?) Infobox references

Ammonium azide is the chemical compound with the formula [NH_{4}]N_{3}, being the salt of ammonia and hydrazoic acid. Like other inorganic azides, this colourless crystalline salt is a powerful explosive, although it has a remarkably low sensitivity. [NH_{4}]N_{3} is physiologically active and inhalation of small amounts causes headaches and palpitations. It was first obtained by Theodor Curtius in 1890, along with other azides.

== Structure ==
Ammonium azide is ionic, meaning it is a salt consisting of ammonium cations [NH_{4}]^{+} and azide anions N^{−}_{3}, therefore its formula is [NH_{4}]^{+}[N_{3}]^{−}. It is a structural isomer of tetrazene. Ammonium azide contains about 93% nitrogen by mass.

== Preparation ==
There are two major methods of producing ammonium azide. Small quantities (grams) of ammonium azide are produced by bubbling ammonia gas through a solution of hydrazoic acid in diethyl ether:

NH_{3} + HN_{3} → [NH_{4}]N_{3}

Larger quantities are produced by the reaction of sodium azide and ammonium chloride in dimethylformamide at 100 °C.
