= Boron triazide =

Names
- IUPAC name Triazidoborane
- Other names Triazidoborane

Identifiers
CAS Number	21884-15-1
3D model (JSmol)	Interactive image
ChemSpider	29329370
PubChem CID	101089385
CompTox Dashboard (EPA)	DTXSID901336502
- InChI: InChI=1S/BN9/c2-8-5-1(6-9-3)7-10-4 Key: UQZCOUGMLLHWNZ-UHFFFAOYSA-N
- SMILES: B(N=[N+]=[N-])(N=[N+]=[N-])N=[N+]=[N-]

Properties
Chemical formula	B(N_{3})_{3}
Molar mass	136.87 g/mol
Appearance	colorless crystals
Solubility	soluble in diethyl ether
- Except where otherwise noted, data are given for materials in their standard state (at 25 °C [77 °F], 100 kPa). Infobox references

Boron triazide, also known as triazidoborane, is a thermally unstable compound of boron and nitrogen with a nitrogen content of 92.1% (by the standard atomic weight). Formally, it is the triazido derivative of borane and is a covalent inorganic azide. The high-energy compound, which has the propensity to undergo spontaneous explosive decomposition, was first described in 1954 by Egon Wiberg and Horst Michaud of LMU Munich.

== Preparation ==
The first method is by the addition of diborane to a solution of hydrazoic acid in diethyl ether at a temperature range between −20 °C and −10 °C. This synthesis proceeds via the intermediates monoazidoborane, BH_{2}N_{3}, and diazidoborane, BH(N_{3})_{2}.

B_{2}H_{6} + 6 HN_{3} → 2 B(N_{3})_{3} + 6 H_{2}

The compound can also be obtained by passing boron tribromide vapor over solid silver azide in high vacuum.

BBr_{3} + 3 AgN_{3} → B(N_{3})_{3} + 3 AgBr

A similar gas-phase synthesis uses the spontaneous reaction of boron trichloride with hydrazoic acid.

BCl_{3} + 3 HN_{3} → B(N_{3})_{3} + 3 HCl

== Properties ==
The compound forms colorless crystals that are only stable at low temperatures. Above −35 °C, an explosive decomposition may occur. In the gas phase, generated boron triazide decomposes at room temperature within 60 minutes via loss of nitrogen gas to form boron nitrides with formulas BN_{3} and BN. These reactions can also be initiated photochemically by UV radiation in the compounds absorption range at about 230 nm.

B(N_{3})_{3} → BN_{3} + 3 N_{2}
B(N_{3})_{3} → BN + 4 N_{2}

In contact with water, it undergoes hydrolysis to hydrazoic acid and boron trioxide.

2 B(N_{3})_{3} + 3 H_{2}O → 6 HN_{3} + B_{2}O_{3}

Reaction with other azides like sodium azide or lithium azide yields the corresponding tetraazidoborate complexes.

B(N_{3})_{3} + NaN_{3} → Na[B(N_{3})_{4}]
B(N_{3})_{3} + LiN_{3} → Li[B(N_{3})_{4}]

The parent tetraazidoboric acid, H[B(N_{3})_{4}], can be obtained at temperatures lower than −60 °C.

== Uses ==
Due to the low stability, the compound itself is not used as a high-energy substance. However, the tetraazidoborate derivatives and adducts with bases such as quinoline, pyrazine or 2,2,6,6-tetramethylpiperidine have potential for this usage. The gas-phase decomposition of the compound is also of interest as a method of coating surfaces with boron nitride.
