= Explosophore =

Functional group which gives an organic molecule explosive properties

Explosophores are functional groups in organic chemistry that give organic compounds explosive properties.

== History ==
The term was first coined by Russian chemist V. Pletz in 1935 and originally mistranslated in some articles as plosophore. Also of note is an auxoexplose concept (similar to chromophore and auxochrome concept), which is a group that modifies the explosive capability of the molecule. The term explosophore has been used more frequently after its use in books such as Organic Chemistry of Explosives by J. Agrawal and R. Hodgson (2007)'.

== Properties ==
Nitrogen-containing explosophores (groups I, II and III below) are particularly strong because in addition to providing oxygen they react to form molecular nitrogen, which is a very stable molecule, and thus the overall reaction is strongly exothermic. The gas formed also expands, causing the shock wave which is observed.

== Classification ==
Pletz grouped the explosophores into eight distinct categories.

I. −NO_{2}, −ON=O, −ONO_{2}
These represent:
- the nitro group, a nitrogen atom bound to two oxygen atoms as well as an organic molecule (e.g. TNT, RDX)
- the nitrate ion, a nitrogen atom bound to three oxygen atoms, (e.g. nitroglycerin, ANFO)
- the nitrite ion, a nitrogen atom bound to two oxygen atoms
Most commercially used explosives include the nitrate ion or the nitro group.

II. −N=N−, −N^{−}=N^{+}=N^{−}−
The azo and azide groups respectively, connected to organic/inorganic compounds (e.g. silver azide AgN_{3}, lead azide Pb(N_{3})_{2}, ammonium azide NH_{4}N_{3})

III. −R_{n}NX_{m}
The halogenated nitrogen group X:halogen (e.g. nitrogen triiodide NI_{3} and nitrogen trichloride NCl_{3})

IV. −C=N−O−
The fulminate group (e.g. fulminic acid HONC and mercury fulminate Hg(ONC)_{2})

V. −OClO_{2}, −OClO_{3}
The chlorate and perchlorate groups respectively, connected to organics/inorganics (e.g. potassium chlorate KClO_{3}, fluorine perchlorate FOClO_{3})

VI. −O−O−, −O_{3}−
The peroxide and ozonide groups respectively, connected to organics/inorganics (e.g. acetone peroxide, butanone peroxide)

VII. −C≡C^{−} M^{+}
The acetylide group with its metal derivatives (e.g. silver acetylide Ag_{2}C_{2}, copper acetylide Cu_{2}C_{2})

VIII. A metal atom connected by an unstable bond to the carbon of certain organic radicals
This class contains for instance organic compounds of mercury, thallium, and lead.

Other
Other substances have been characterised as explosophores outside of the eight classes as defined by Pletz.
