= Rubidium azide =

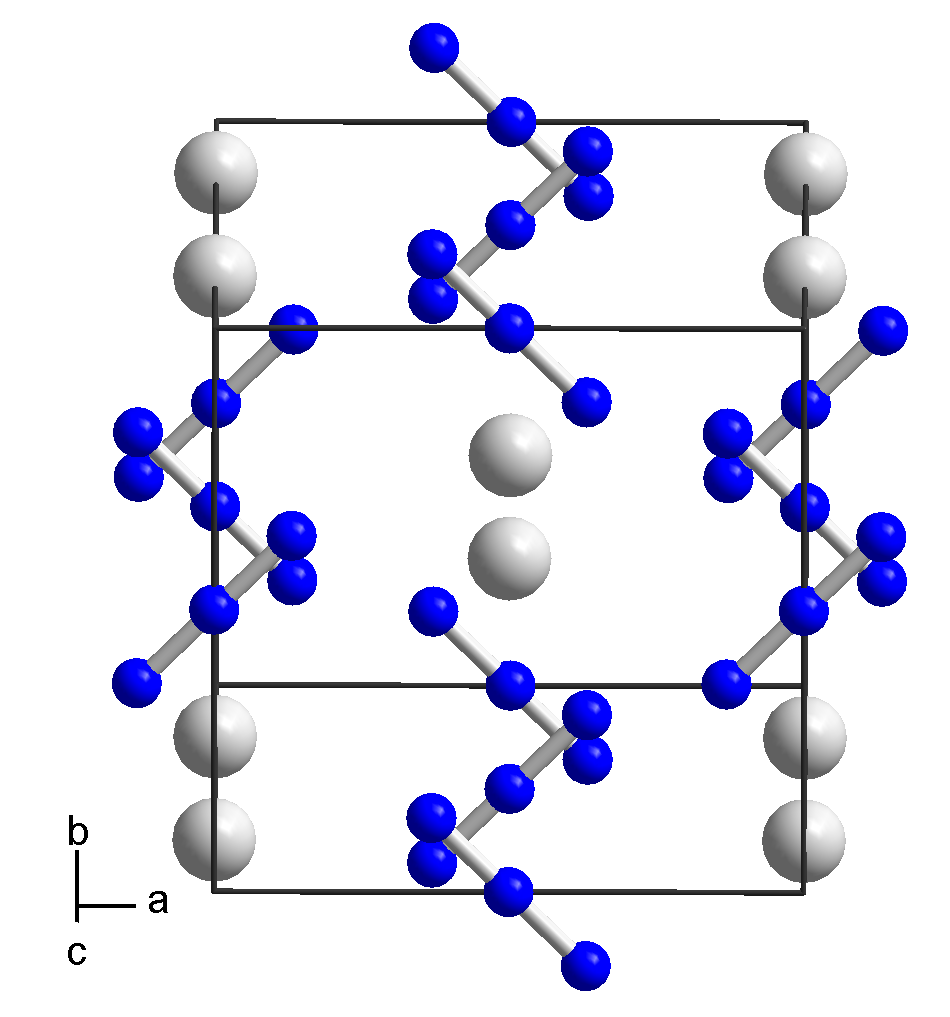

Names
- IUPAC name Rubidium(1+);azide
- Other names Rubidium azide

Identifiers
CAS Number	22756-36-1
3D model (JSmol)	Interactive image
ChemSpider	81078
PubChem CID	89824
CompTox Dashboard (EPA)	DTXSID70945439
- InChI: InChI=1S/N3.Rb/c1-3-2;/q-1;+1 Key: GEWQYWRSUXOTOL-UHFFFAOYSA-N
- SMILES: [N-]=[N+]=[N-].[Rb+]

Properties
Chemical formula	RbN_{3}
Molar mass	127.49 g⋅mol^{−1}
Appearance	Colorless needles
Density	2.79 g⋅cm^{−3}
Melting point	317–321 °C (603–610 °F; 590–594 K)
Boiling point	Decomposes
Solubility in water	107.1 g/100 g (16 °C); 114.1 g/100 g (17 °C)
Solubility	0.182 g/100 g (16 °C, ethanol)

Thermochemistry
Std enthalpy of formation (Δ_{f}H^{⦵}_{298})	−0.1 kcal⋅mol^{−1}

Hazards
NFPA 704 (fire diamond)	4 0 3

Related compounds
Other anions	Rubidium nitrate
Other cations	Lithium azide Sodium azide Potassium azide Silver azide Ammonium azide
- Except where otherwise noted, data are given for materials in their standard state (at 25 °C [77 °F], 100 kPa). Infobox references

Rubidium azide is an inorganic compound with the formula RbN_{3}. It is the rubidium salt of the hydrazoic acid HN_{3}. Like most azides, it is explosive.

== Structure ==
At room temperature, rubidium azide has the same structure as potassium hydrogen fluoride; a distorted caesium chloride structure. At 315 °C and 1 atm, rubidium azide will transition to the normal caesium chloride structure. The II/I transition temperature of rubidium azide is within 2 °C of its melting point.

Rubidium azide has a high pressure structure transition, which occurs at about 4.8 kilobars of pressure at 0 °C. The transition boundary of the II/III transition can be defined by the relationship $P = 4.82 + 0.0240\,t$, where $P$ is the pressure in kilobars and $t$ is the temperature in degrees Celsius.

== Preparation ==
Rubidium azide can be created by the reaction between rubidium sulfate and barium azide which results in formation of easily separated insoluble barium sulfate:

Rb_{2}SO_{4} + Ba(N_{3})_{2} → 2 RbN_{3} + BaSO_{4}

In at least one study, rubidium azide was produced by the reaction between butyl nitrite, hydrazine monohydrate, and rubidium hydroxide in the presence of ethanol:

C_{4}H_{9}ONO + N_{2}H_{4}·H_{2}O + RbOH → RbN_{3} + C_{4}H_{9}OH + 3 H_{2}O

This formula is typically used to synthesize potassium azide from caustic potash.

== Uses ==
Rubidium azide has been investigated for possible use in alkali vapor cells, which are components of atomic clocks, atomic magnetometers and atomic gyroscopes. Azides are desirable starting materials because they decompose into rubidium metal and nitrogen gas when exposed to UV light. According to one publication:

Among the different techniques used to fill microfabricated alkali vapor cell [sic], UV decomposition of rubidium azide (RbN_{3}) into metallic Rb and nitrogen in Al_{2}O_{3} coated cells is a very promising approach for low-cost wafer-level fabrication.

== Reactions ==
As with all azides, it will decompose and release nitrogen gas when heated or severely shocked:

2 RbN_{3} → 2 Rb + 3 N_{2}

Discharge rubidium azide in nitrogen gas will produce rubidium nitride.

== Hazards ==
At 4.1 kilobars of pressure and about 460 °C, rubidium azide will explosively decompose. Under normal circumstances, it explodes at 395 °C. It also decomposes upon exposure to ultraviolet light.

Rubidium azide is very sensitive to mechanical shock, with an impact sensitivity comparable to that of TNT.

Like all azides, rubidium azide is toxic.
