= Caesium azide =

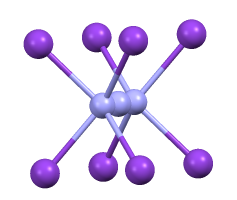
- Coordination sphere of azide in CsN_{3}

Names
- IUPAC name caesium azide
- Other names cesium azide

Identifiers
CAS Number	22750-57-8
3D model (JSmol)	Interactive image
ChemSpider	81071
ECHA InfoCard	100.041.072
EC Number	245-196-0
PubChem CID	6101636
CompTox Dashboard (EPA)	DTXSID601014422 DTXSID60929869, DTXSID601014422
- InChI: InChI=1S/Cs.N3/c;1-3-2/q+1;-1 Key: AYTVLULEEPNWAX-UHFFFAOYSA-N; InChI=1S/Cs.N3/c;1-3-2/q+1;-1
- SMILES: [N-]=[N+]=[N-].[Cs+]

Properties
Chemical formula	CsN_{3}
Molar mass	174.926 g/mol
Appearance	colorless needles
Density	3.5 g/cm^{3}
Melting point	310 °C (590 °F; 583 K)
Solubility in water	224.2 g/100 mL (0 °C)

Structure
Crystal structure	tetragonal
Space group	I4/mcm, No. 140
Lattice constant	a = 6.5412 Å, c = 8.0908 Å
Formula units (Z)	4
- Except where otherwise noted, data are given for materials in their standard state (at 25 °C [77 °F], 100 kPa). Infobox references

Caesium azide or cesium azide is an inorganic compound of caesium and nitrogen. It is a salt of azide with the formula CsN_{3}.

== Structure ==
CsN_{3} adopts the same structure as KN_{3}, RbN_{3}, and TlN_{3}, crystallizing in a tetragonal distorted caesium chloride structure where each azide ion coordinates to eight metal cations, and each metal cation coordinates to eight terminal N centers. When heated to 151 °C, it transitions to a cubic structure.

== Preparation and reactions ==
Caesium azide can be prepared from the neutralization reaction between hydrazoic acid and caesium hydroxide:

CsOH + HN_{3} → CsN_{3} + H_{2}O

Caesium carbonate can also be used as the base:

Cs_{2}CO_{3} + HN_{3} → CsN_{3} + CO_{2} + H_{2}O

Caesium sulfate reacts with barium azide to form insoluble barium sulfate and caesium azide:

Cs_{2}SO_{4} + Ba(N_{3})_{2} → 2CsN_{3} + BaSO_{4}↓

The thermal decomposition of CsN_{3} in vacuo can be used as a method of generating high purity caesium metal:

2 CsN_{3} → 2 Cs + 3 N_{2}
