= Radium azide =

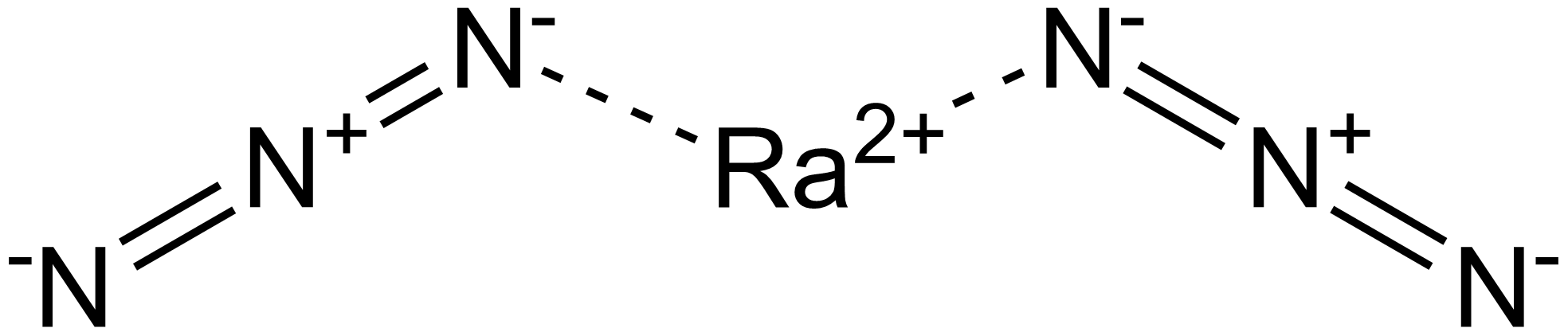

Names
- Preferred IUPAC name Radium azide

Identifiers
CAS Number	98966-75-7
3D model (JSmol)	Interactive image
- InChI: InChI=1S/Ra.2N3/c;2*1-3-2/q+2;2*-1 Key: HIUMKPQDFAKAIP-UHFFFAOYSA-N
- SMILES: [Ra+2].[N-]=[N+]=[N-].[N-]=[N+]=[N-]

Properties
Chemical formula	N_{6}Ra
Molar mass	310 g·mol^{−1}
Appearance	white crystalline solid

Related compounds
Related compounds	Barium azide
- Except where otherwise noted, data are given for materials in their standard state (at 25 °C [77 °F], 100 kPa). Infobox references

Radium azide is an inorganic compound of radium and nitrogen with the chemical formula Ra(N_{3})_{2}.

== Synthesis ==
Radium azide can be prepared by dissolving radium carbonate in aqueous hydrazoic acid and evaporating the resulting solution.

== Physical properties ==
Radium azide forms a white crystalline solid.

== Chemical properties ==
The compound decomposes when heated to 180–250 °C:

Ra(N_{3})_{2} → Ra + 3N_{2}
