= Barium azide =

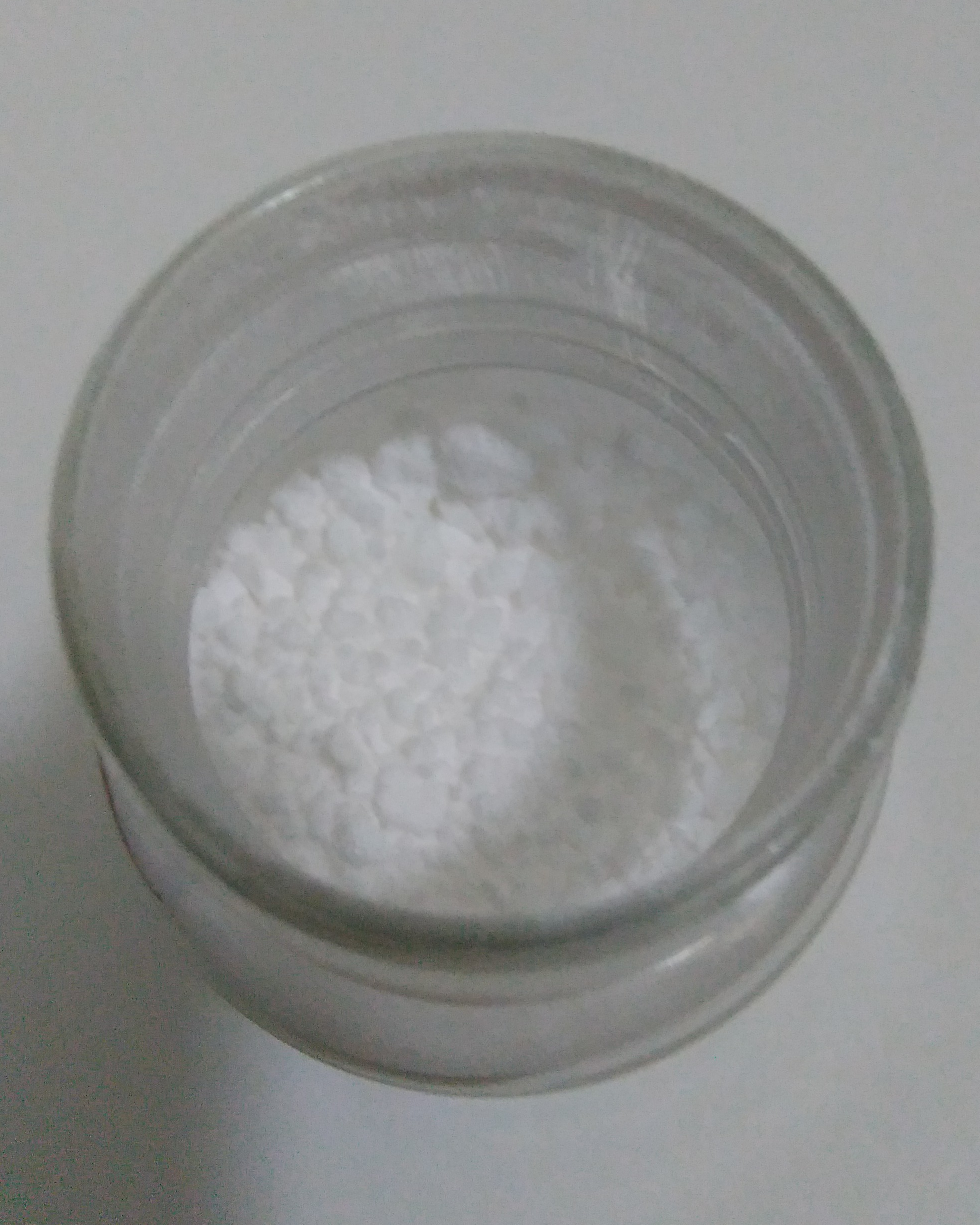

Names
- Other names Barium dinitride

Identifiers
CAS Number	18810-58-7
3D model (JSmol)	Interactive image
ChemSpider	56472
ECHA InfoCard	100.038.706
EC Number	242-594-6
PubChem CID	62728
UN number	1687
CompTox Dashboard (EPA)	DTXSID60908174
- InChI: InChI=1S/Ba.2N3/c;2*1-3-2/q+2;2*-1 Key: UUXFWHMUNNXFHD-UHFFFAOYSA-N
- SMILES: [Ba+2].[N-]=[N+]=[N-].[N-]=[N+]=[N-]

Properties
Chemical formula	Ba(N_{3})_{2}
Molar mass	221.37 g/mol
Appearance	White crystalline solid
Odor	Odourless
Density	2.936 g/cm^{3}
Melting point	126 °C (259 °F; 399 K)
Boiling point	160 °C (320 °F; 433 K) (initial decomposition) >217 °C (deflagrates); 180 °C (initial decomposition), 225 °C explosion
Solubility in water	11.5 g/100 mL (0 °C); 14.98 g/100 mL (15.7 °C); 15.36 g/100 mL (20 °C); 22.73 g/100 mL (52.1 °C); 24.75 g/100 mL (70 °C)
Solubility in ethanol	0.017 g/100 mL (16 °C)
Solubility in acetone	Insoluble
Solubility in ether	Insoluble

Structure
Crystal structure	Monoclinic

Hazards
- GHS labelling
Pictograms	(GHS01: Explosive) (GHS06: Toxic)
Signal word	Danger
Hazard statements	H200, H301, H315, H319, H331, H335
Precautionary statements	P210, P240, P264, P280, P305+P351+P338, P310
- Safety data sheet (SDS)
- Except where otherwise noted, data are given for materials in their standard state (at 25 °C [77 °F], 100 kPa). verify (what is ?) Infobox references

Barium azide is an inorganic azide with the formula Ba(N_{3})_{2}. It is a barium salt of hydrazoic acid. Like all azides, it is explosive. It is less sensitive to mechanical shock than lead azide.

== Preparation ==
Barium azide may be prepared by reacting sodium azide with a soluble barium salt:

BaBr_{2} + 2 NaN_{3} → Ba(N_{3})_{2} + 2NaBr

== Uses ==
Barium azide can be used to make azides of magnesium, sodium, potassium, lithium, rubidium and zinc with their respective sulfates.

Ba(N_{3})_{2} + Li_{2}SO_{4} → 2 LiN_{3} + BaSO_{4}

It can also be used as a source for high purity nitrogen by heating:

Ba(N_{3})_{2} → Ba + 3 N_{2}

This reaction liberates metallic barium, which is used as a getter in vacuum applications.

== See also ==
- Calcium azide
- Sodium azide
- Hydrazoic acid
