= Zinc azide =

Names
- IUPAC name Zinc(II) azide
- Other names Zinc diazide

Identifiers
CAS Number	14215-28-2
3D model (JSmol)	Interactive image
ChemSpider	26583533
PubChem CID	131722987
CompTox Dashboard (EPA)	DTXSID301337045
- InChI: InChI=1S/2N3.Zn/c2*1-3-2;/q2*-1;+2 Key: QFDUTPNKBRXHTC-UHFFFAOYSA-N
- SMILES: [N-]=[N+]=[N-].[N-]=[N+]=[N-].[Zn+2]

Properties
Chemical formula	Zn(N_{3})_{2}
Molar mass	149.4 g/mol
Appearance	White solid
Density	2.559 g/cm^{3} (α polymorph)
- Except where otherwise noted, data are given for materials in their standard state (at 25 °C [77 °F], 100 kPa). Infobox references

Zinc azide Zn(N_{3})_{2} is an inorganic compound composed of zinc cations (Zn^{2+}) and azide anions (N^{−}_{3}). It is a white, explosive solid that can be prepared by the protonolysis of diethylzinc with hydrazoic acid:

Zn(C_{2}H_{5})_{2} + 2 HN_{3} → Zn(N_{3})_{2} + 2 C_{2}H_{6}

== Properties ==
Zinc azide is a coordination polymer which crystallizes in three polymorphs, all of which feature tetrahedral zinc centers and bridging azide ligands. α-Zn(N_{3})_{2} crystallizes in the monoclinic space group and is stable, while the other two polymorphs are metastable. P2_{1}/n. β-Zn(N_{3})_{2} is trigonal, space group P3_{2}21, and γ-Zn(N_{3})_{2} is monoclinic, space group C2.

It is easily hydrolyzed, and attempts to prepare it in aqueous solution resulted in the precipitation of basic azides Zn(OH)_{2−x}(N_{3})_{x} (x = 0.9–1.0). Both the α- and β-forms were found to be very friction- and shock-sensitive, violently exploding in blue flashes, but can be made to decompose slowly by gentle heating, giving off nitrogen gas. In a sealed glass tube with inert atmosphere, this yields zinc nitride, Zn_{3}N_{2}.
