= 2-Dimethylaminoethylazide =

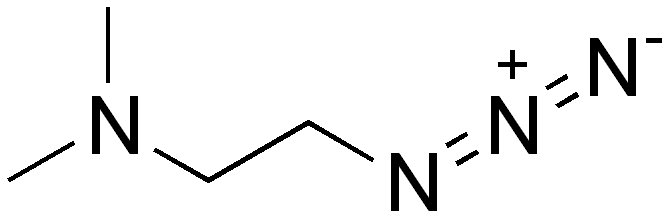

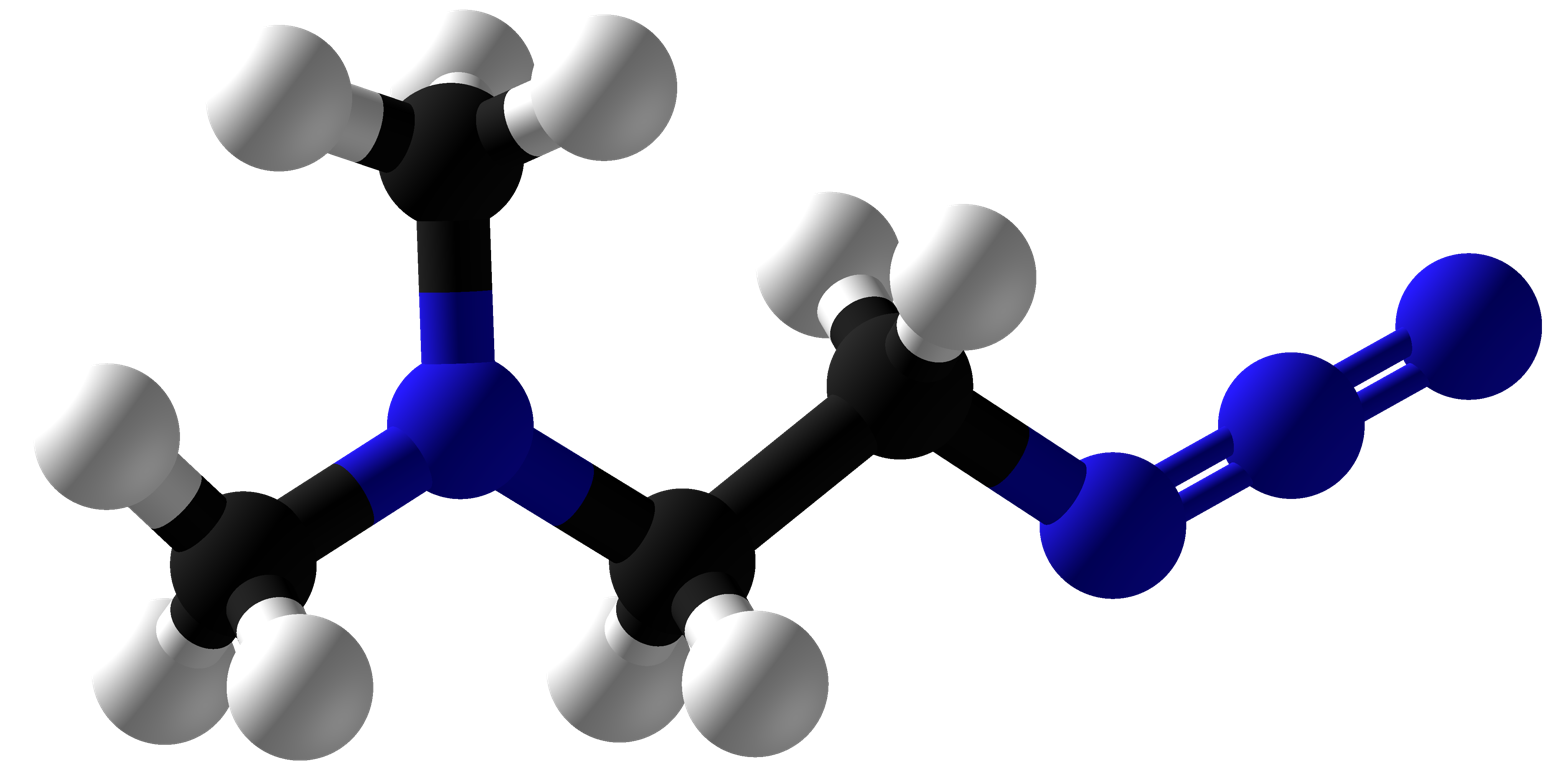

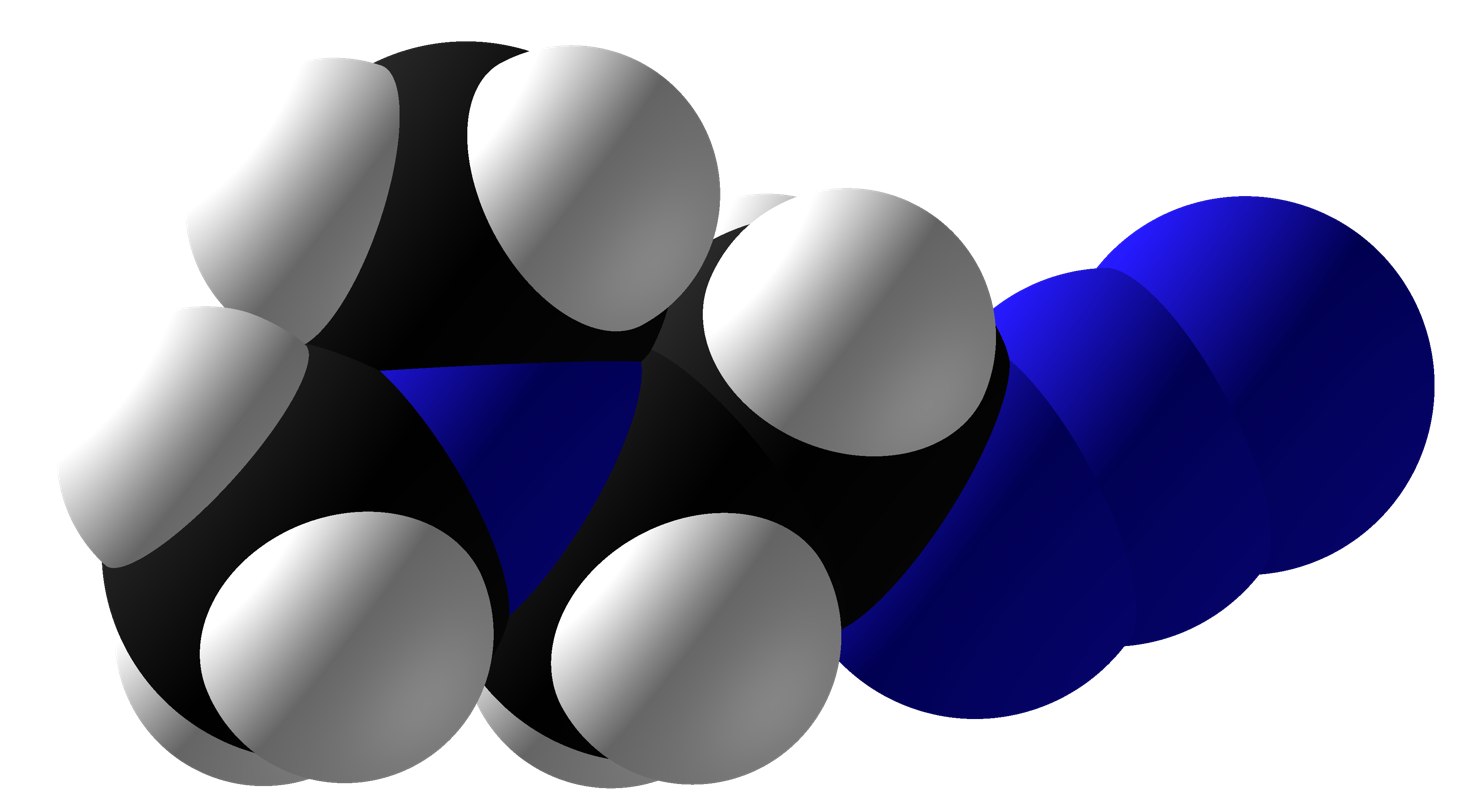

Names
- Preferred IUPAC name 2-Azido-N,N-dimethylethan-1-amine
- Other names Dimethyl(2-azidoethyl)amine

Identifiers
| CAS Number | 86147-04-8 |
| 3D model (JSmol) | Interactive image |
| ChemSpider | 11308317 |
| PubChem CID | 22280928 |
| UNII | 4RXN7MWX34 |
| CompTox Dashboard (EPA) | DTXSID40624284 |
- InChI: InChI=1S/C4H10N4/c1-8(2)4-3-6-7-5/h3-4H2,1-2H3 Key: XIXCIVDAWWCJJR-UHFFFAOYSA-N; InChI=1/C4H10N4/c1-8(2)4-3-6-7-5/h3-4H2,1-2H3 Key: XIXCIVDAWWCJJR-UHFFFAOYAI
- SMILES: CN(C)CCN=[N+]=[N-]

Properties
| Chemical formula | (CH_{3})_{2}NCH_{2}CH_{2}N_{3} |
| Molar mass | 114.152 g·mol^{−1} |
| Appearance | Colorless liquid |
| Density | 0.9930 g/cm^{3} |
| Melting point | −68.9 °C (−92.0 °F; 204.2 K) |
| Boiling point | 135 °C (275 °F; 408 K) |
| Solubility | Acetone, ethers, alcohols, hydrocarbons, THF |

Thermochemistry
| Std enthalpy of formation (Δ_{f}H^{⦵}_{298}) | +586 cal/g |

Hazards
| Flash point | 29.4 °C (84.9 °F; 302.5 K) |
- Except where otherwise noted, data are given for materials in their standard state (at 25 °C [77 °F], 100 kPa). verify (what is ?) Infobox references

2-Dimethylaminoethylazide (DMAZ) is a liquid rocket fuel being investigated for use as a spacecraft propellent to replace the toxic, carcinogenic monomethylhydrazine. It is a member of the competitive impulse non-carcinogenic hypergol (CINCH) family which were assessed as a replacement for hydrazine-derived propellants. DMAZ was found to be insensitive to impact, direct flame and shock wave. However, it showed sensitivity to heat in confined space and electrostatic discharge.

== Formation and reactions ==
DMAZ is an organic azide, which is prepared by reacting the chloride of the corresponding alkyl-amine (in this case dimethyl ethylamine) with sodium azide:

NaN_{3} + N(CH_{3})_{2}CH_{2}CH_{2}−Cl → NaCl + N(CH_{3})_{2}CH_{2}CH_{2}−N_{3}

Ideally, the complete combustion of DMAZ produces carbon dioxide, water, and nitrogen:

2 (CH_{3})_{2}NCH_{2}CH_{2}N_{3} + 13 O_{2} → 8 CO_{2} + 10 H_{2}O + 4 N_{2}

DMAZ reacts readily with nitric acid.

== Ignition delays ==
During their inquiry into finding alternative hypergolic fuel, a joint effort by the Aviation and Missile Research, Development, and Engineering Center (AMRDEC), the U.S. Army Research Laboratory (ARL), and the National Aeronautics and Space Administration (NASA) determined that DMAZ could perform competitively with Aerozine-50 and is less toxic than hydrazine-based fuels. However, DMAZ-inhibited red fuming nitric acid (IRFNA) systems have demonstrated longer ignition delays than monomethylhydrazine-IRFNA systems. In an effort to address this issue, researchers synthesized the related compounds 2-azidoethanamines – 2-azido-N-methylethanamine (MMAZ) and 2-azido-N-cyclopropylethanamine (CPAZ) in hopes of enhancing the reactivity of DMAZ's amine nitrogen to reduce ignition delays. MMAZ is not hypergolic, while CPAZ is hypergolic.

According to research conducted by Army Research Laboratory, the azido group in DMAZ's lowest energy structure will prevent the transfer of protons from nitric acid to the amine lone pair acid, a chemical reaction that may be associated with a rate-limiting step in DMAZ-IRFNA ignition.

However, according to a 2014 ARL report, a correlation between compound basicities and ignition delays was not observed, which indicates that the proton transfer from nitric acid to DMAZ's amine may not be a rate-controlling step in the ignition process of DMAZ-IRFNA systems.
