= Azium =

Azium may refer to:

- Dexamethasone, a steroid drug
- Sodium azide, a chemical used in airbags
