= Magnesium azide =

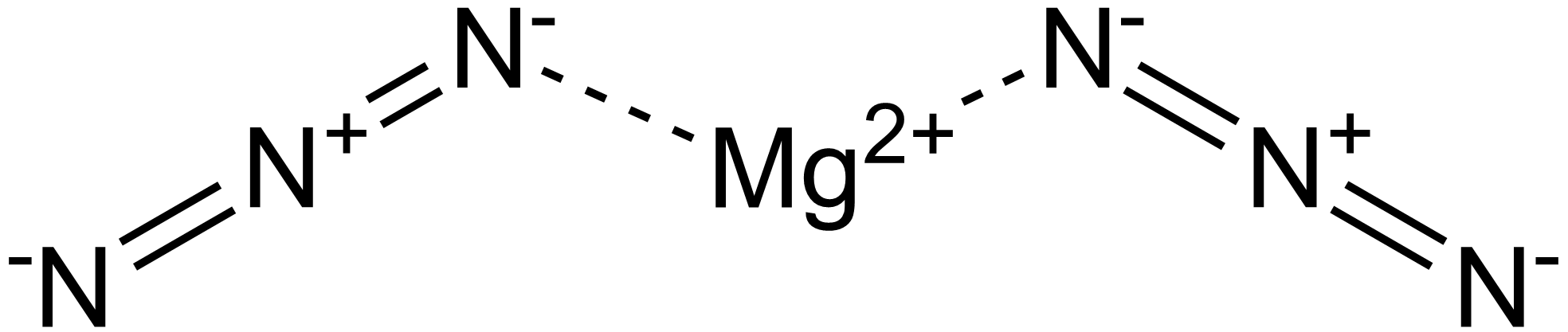

Names
- IUPAC name Magnesium azide
- Other names Magnesium diazide

Identifiers
CAS Number	39108-12-8
3D model (JSmol)	Interactive image
PubChem CID	21652192
CompTox Dashboard (EPA)	DTXSID40616604
- InChI: InChI=1S/Mg.2N3/c;2*1-3-2/q+2;2*-1 Key: TWRAJPCQPHBABR-UHFFFAOYSA-N
- SMILES: [N-]=[N+]=[N-].[N-]=[N+]=[N-].[Mg+2]

Properties
Chemical formula	Mg(N_{3})_{2}
Molar mass	108.35 g/mol

Hazards
- GHS labelling
Pictograms	(GHS01: Explosive)
Signal word	Danger
- Except where otherwise noted, data are given for materials in their standard state (at 25 °C [77 °F], 100 kPa). Infobox references

Magnesium azide is an inorganic chemical compound with the formula Mg(N_{3})_{2}. It is composed of the magnesium cation (Mg^{2+}) and the azide anions (N^{−}_{3}).

== Properties ==
Magnesium azide hydrolyzes easily. Like most azides, it is explosive.
