= Strontium azide =

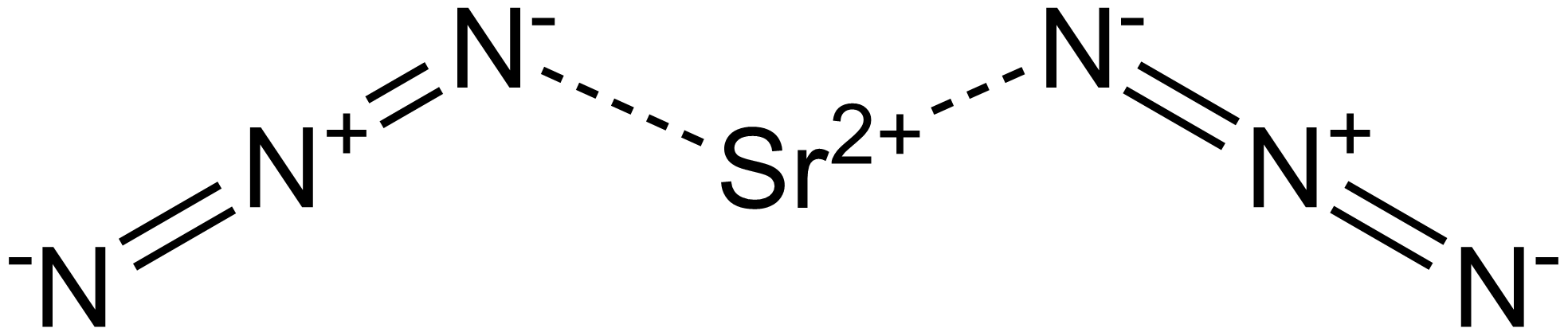

Names
- IUPAC name Strontium azide
- Other names Strontium diazide

Identifiers
CAS Number	19465-89-5
3D model (JSmol)	Interactive image
ChemSpider	25945876
PubChem CID	57375454
CompTox Dashboard (EPA)	DTXSID20724938
- InChI: InChI=1S/2N3.Sr/c2*1-3-2;/q2*-1;+2 Key: PDEROVFZLWBVSG-UHFFFAOYSA-N
- SMILES: [N-]=[N+]=[N-].[N-]=[N+]=[N-].[Sr+2]

Properties
Chemical formula	Sr(N_{3})_{2}
Molar mass	171.66 g/mol

Hazards
- GHS labelling
Pictograms	(GHS01: Explosive)
Signal word	Danger
- Except where otherwise noted, data are given for materials in their standard state (at 25 °C [77 °F], 100 kPa). Infobox references

Strontium azide is an inorganic chemical compound with the formula Sr(N_{3})_{2}. It is composed of the strontium cation (Sr^{2+}) and the azide anions (N^{−}_{3}).

== Properties ==
Strontium azide crystallizes in an orthorhombic Fddd space group. Unlike the azides of alkali metals which have a linear azide ion formation, strontium azide possesses bent azide ions, which can continue to bend further when under higher pressure.
