= Theodor Curtius =

German chemist (1857–1928)

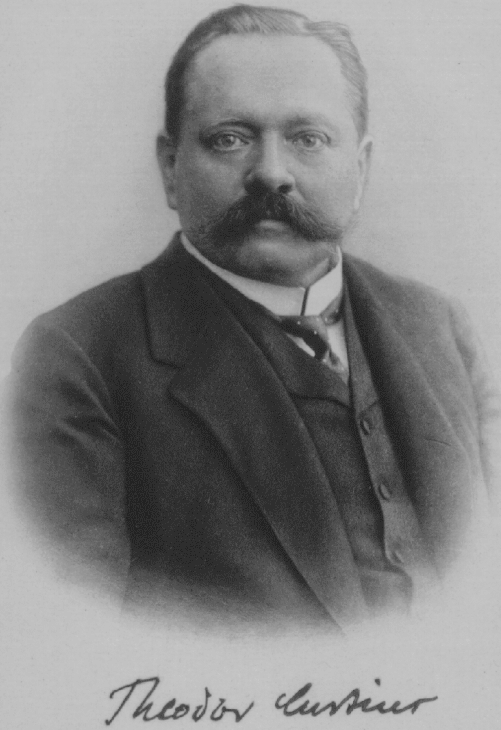
- Theodor Curtius, approx. 1880
- Born: Julius Wilhelm Theodor Curtius; 27 May 1857; Duisburg, Kingdom of Prussia
- Died: 8 February 1928 (aged 70); Heidelberg, Weimar Republic
- Known for: Curtius rearrangement Büchner–Curtius–Schlotterbeck reaction Ammonium azide Ethyl diazoacetate Hexamethylenediamine; Hydrazoic acid Lead(II) azide Peptide synthesis Sulfuryl diazide
- Scientific career
- Workplaces: Heidelberg University
- Doctoral advisor: Hermann Kolbe

Geheimrat Julius Wilhelm Theodor Curtius (27 May 1857 – 8 February 1928) was professor of Chemistry at Heidelberg University. He published the Curtius rearrangement in 1890/1894 and also discovered diazoacetic acid, hydrazine and hydrazoic acid. In 1882 he carried out the first ever peptide synthesis, creating the N-protected dipeptide, benzoylglycylglycine.

== History ==
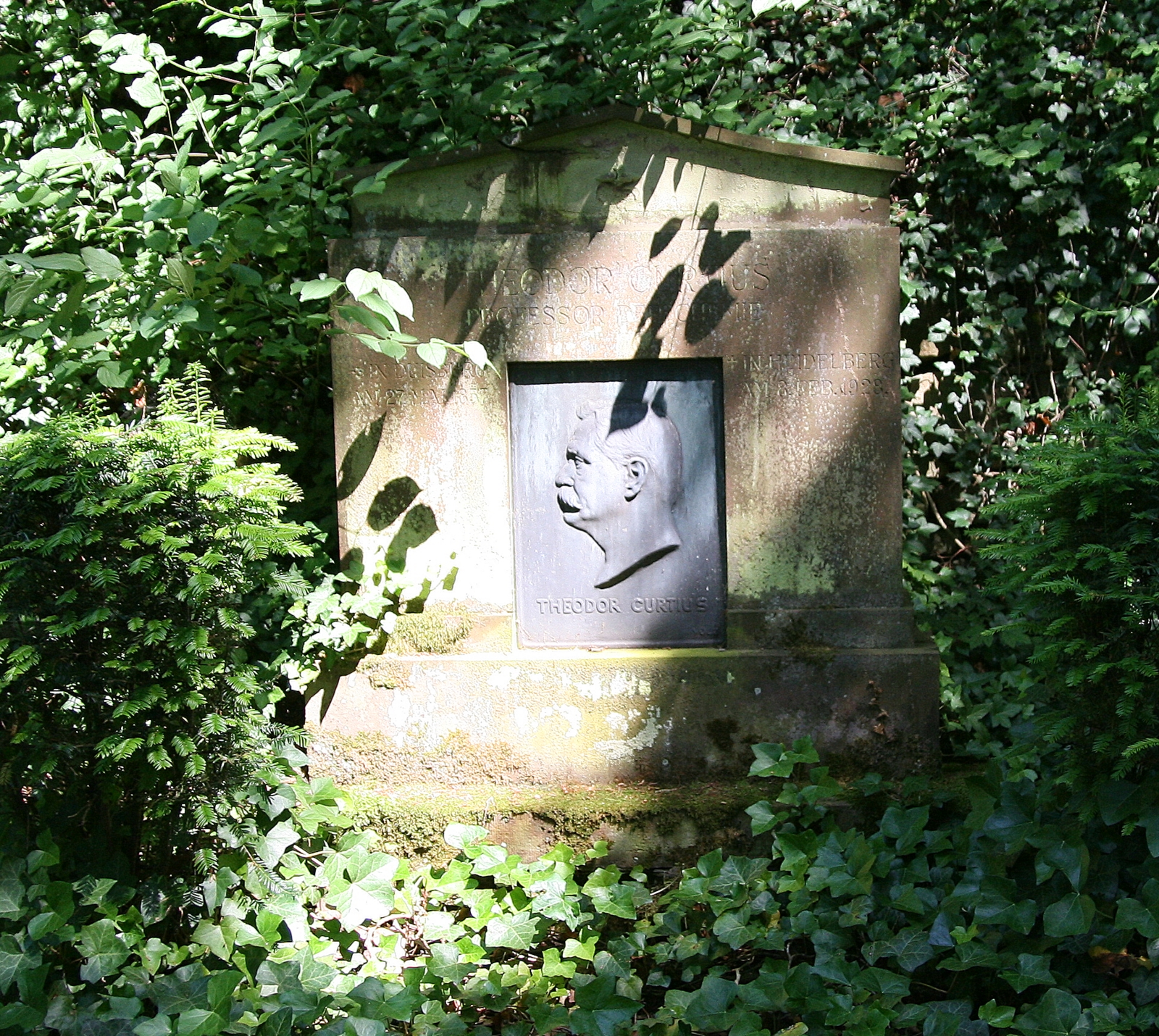
Grave in Heidelberg

Theodor Curtius was born in Duisburg in the Ruhr area in Germany. He studied chemistry with Robert Bunsen at Heidelberg University and with Hermann Kolbe at Leipzig University. He received his doctorate in 1882 at Leipzig University.

After working from 1884 to 1886 for Adolf von Baeyer at the Ludwig-Maximilians-Universität München, Curtius became the director of the analytical chemistry department at University of Erlangen until 1889. Then he accepted the chair in Chemistry at Kiel University, where he remained very productive. In line with this success, Curtius was appointed Geheimer Regierungsrat (Privy Councillor) in 1895. After a one-year appointment as the successor of the famous August Kekulé at the University of Bonn in 1897, Curtius succeeded Victor Meyer as Professor of Chemistry at his old university at Heidelberg University in 1898, where he remained until his retirement in 1926. He was awarded honorary membership of the Manchester Literary and Philosophical Society in 1892 and was succeeded by Karl Freudenberg, who wrote Curtius' biography in 1962.

In his free time, he also composed music, sang in concerts, and was an active mountaineer. In 1894, he founded the Kiel section of the Association of German and Austrian Alpinists, which he personally supported with gifts. In his Munich period, he became a close friend of the alpinist guide Christian Klucker, with whom he made mountaineering hikes for many years thereafter.

Theodor Curtius died in Heidelberg on 8 February 1928.

The Heidelberg University Archives has, in its possession, a photo album from 1907 marking the 25th anniversary of Theodor Curtius receiving his Doctorate. It shows pictures of science scholars, buildings, and labs such as the physio-chemical, pharmaceutical, and organics labs, and much more.

== Major publications by Curtius ==
Curtius wrote over 300 publications. Several had a significant impact on chemical science.

- Diazo- und Azoverbindungen der Fettreihe, Barth, Leipzig (1888)
- Studien mit Hydrazin, Barth, Leipzig, Bd 1,2 (1896), Bd 3,4 (1918)
- Einwirkung von Basen auf Diazoessigester, Berlin (1911)
- Die reduktion der aromatische Aldazine und Ketazine, Barth, Leipzig (1912)
- Hydrazide und Azide der Azidofettsäuren, Berlin (1912)
- Die Einwirkungen von Hydrazin auf Nitroverbindungen, Barth, Leipzig (1913)
- Buchner, E.; Curtius, Th. (1885). "Synthese von Ketonsäureäthern aus Aldehyden und Diazoessigäther". Berichte (in German). 18 (2): 2373–2377. doi:10.1002/cber.188501802118.
- Buchner, E.; Curtius, Th. (1885). "Ueber die Einwirkung von Diazoessigäther auf aromatische Kohlenwasserstoffe". Berichte (in German). 18 (2): 2377–2379. doi:10.1002/cber.188501802119.
- Curtius, Th. (1890). "Chemische Notizen". Berichte (in German). 23 (2): 3023–3041. doi:10.1002/cber.189002302233.
- Curtius, Th. (1894). "Hydrazide und Azide organischer Säuren I. Abhandlung". J. Prakt. Chem. (in German). 50 (1): 275–294. doi:10.1002/prac.18940500125.

== Curtius family ==
The Curtius family is historically from Bremen area. Several other members of the family were notable.

== See also ==
- Curtius

== Sources ==
1. Karl Freudenberg (1963). "Obituary: Theodor Curtius. 1857-1928". Chemische Berichte. 96 (4): I–XXV. doi:10.1002/cber.19630960434.
