= Lead(II) azide =

- Skeletal formula of lead(II) azide

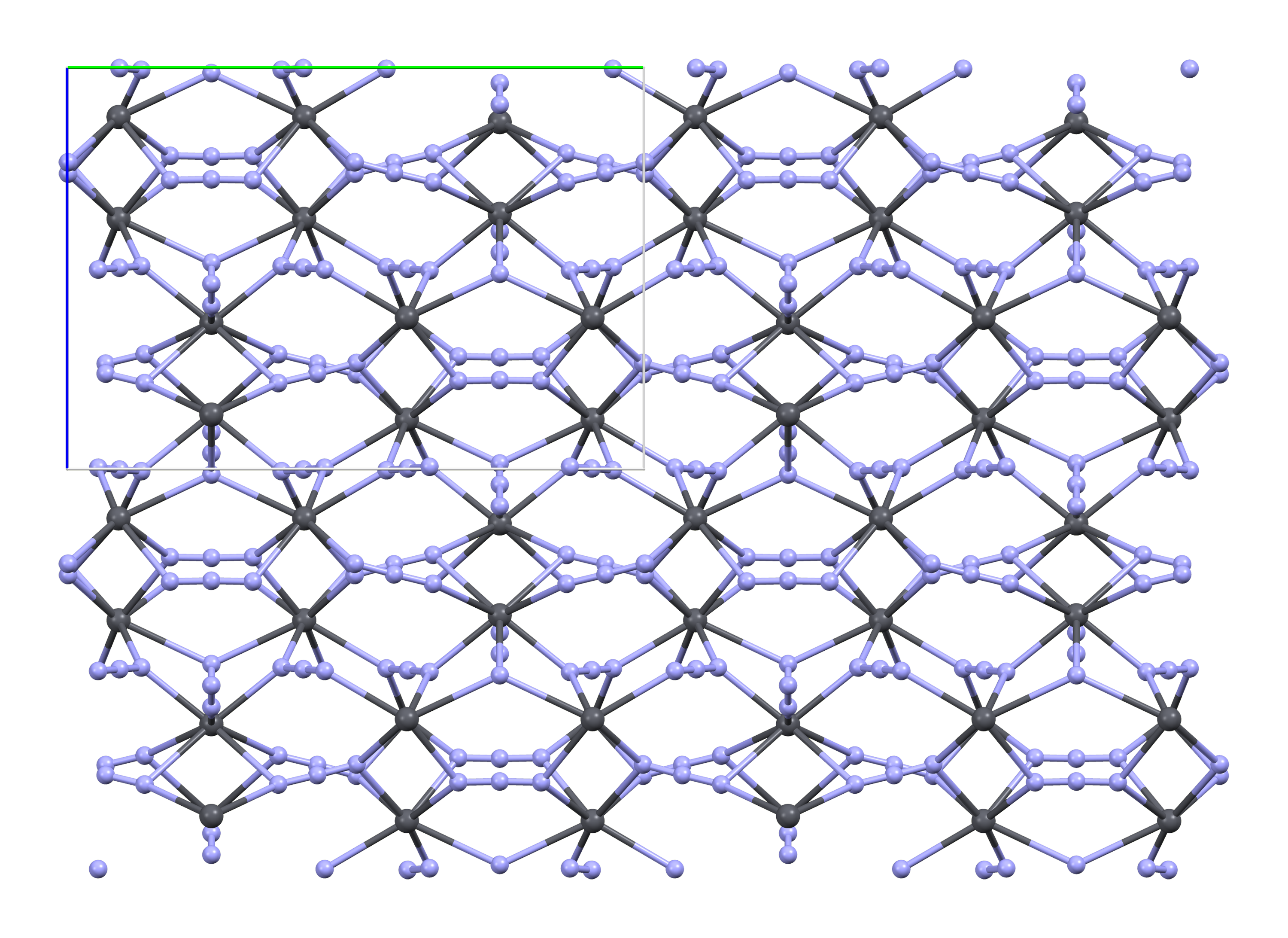

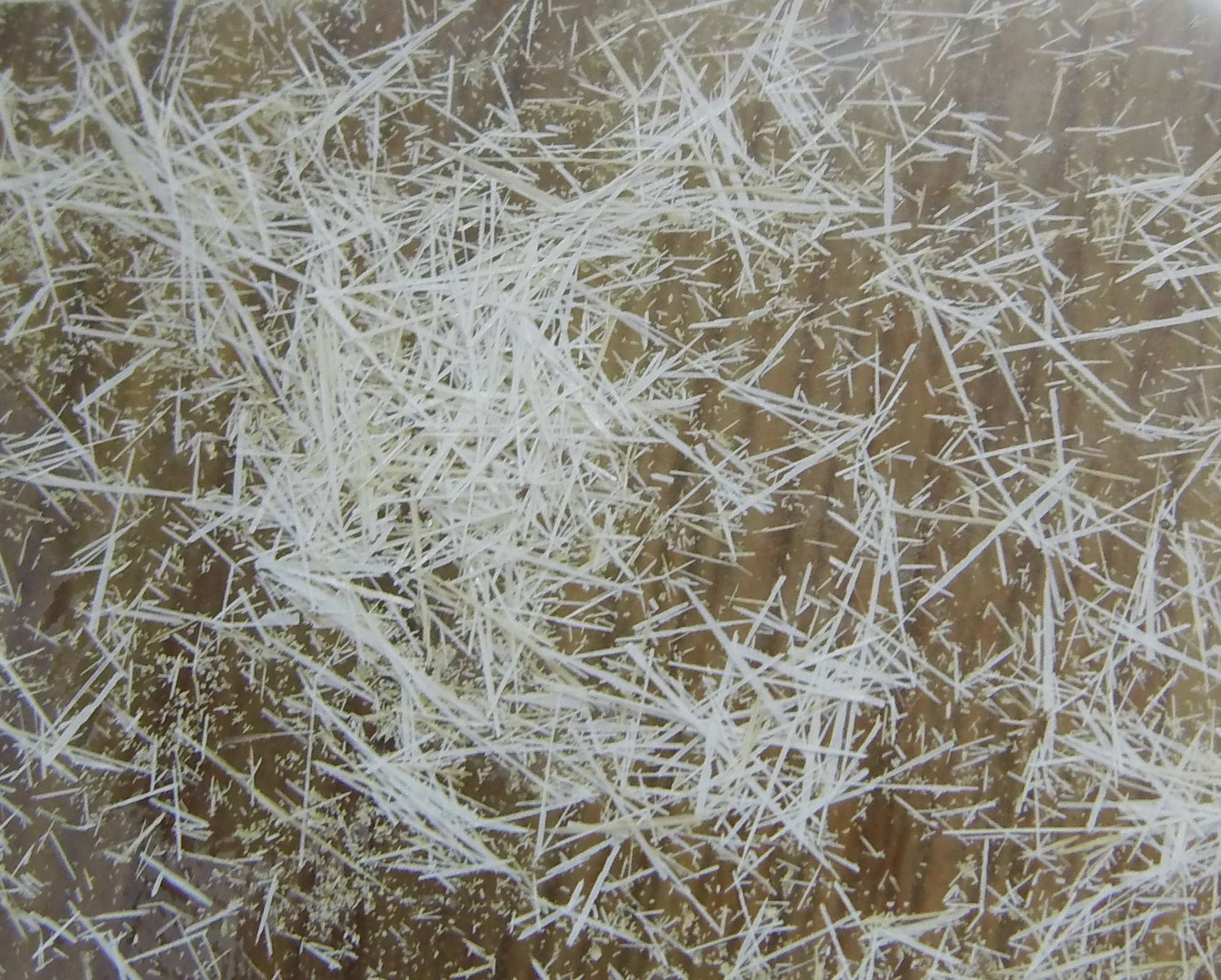
- Lead(II) azide (modified beta)

Names
- IUPAC name Diazidolead

Identifiers
CAS Number	13424-46-9
3D model (JSmol)	Interactive image
ChemSpider	55508
ECHA InfoCard	100.033.206
EC Number	236-542-1
PubChem CID	61600
UNII	677QUF0Z7P
UN number	0129
CompTox Dashboard (EPA)	DTXSID4065448
- InChI: InChI=1S/2N3.Pb/c2*1-3-2;/q2*-1;+2 Key: ISEQAARZRCDNJH-UHFFFAOYSA-N; InChI=1S/2N3.Pb/c2*1-3-2;/q2*-1;+2 Key: ISEQAARZRCDNJH-UHFFFAOYSA-N
- SMILES: [N-]=[N+]=N[Pb]N=[N+]=[N-]

Properties
Chemical formula	Pb(N_{3})_{2}
Molar mass	291.2 g·mol^{−1}
Appearance	White powder
Density	4.71 g/cm^{3}
Melting point	190 °C (374 °F; 463 K) decomposes, explodes at 350 °C
Solubility in water	2.3 g/100 mL (18 °C); 9.0 g/100 mL (70 °C)
Solubility	Very soluble in acetic acid Insoluble in ammonia solution, NH_{4}OH

Thermochemistry
Std enthalpy of formation (Δ_{f}H^{⦵}_{298})	462.3 kJ/mol

Explosive data
Shock sensitivity	High
Friction sensitivity	High
Detonation velocity	5180 m/s

Hazards
- Occupational safety and health (OHS/OSH)
Main hazards	Harmful, explosive
- GHS labelling
Pictograms	(GHS01: Explosive) (GHS06: Toxic) (GHS08: Health hazard) (GHS09: Environmental hazard)
Signal word	Danger
Hazard statements	H200, H302, H332, H360, H373, H410
NFPA 704 (fire diamond)	3 0 4
Autoignition temperature	350 °C (662 °F; 623 K)

Related compounds
Other cations	Potassium azide Sodium azide Copper(II) azide
Related compounds	Hydrazoic acid
- Except where otherwise noted, data are given for materials in their standard state (at 25 °C [77 °F], 100 kPa). verify (what is ?) Infobox references

Lead(II) azide Pb(N_{3})_{2} is an inorganic compound. More so than other azides, it is explosive. It is used in detonators to initiate secondary explosives. In a commercially usable form, it is a white to buff powder.

== Preparation, handling, and destruction ==
Lead(II) azide is prepared by the reaction of sodium azide and lead(II) nitrate in aqueous solution. Lead(II) acetate can also be used.

Thickeners such as dextrin or polyvinyl alcohol are often added to the solution to stabilize the precipitated product. In fact, it is normally shipped in a dextrinated solution that lowers its sensitivity.

Two primary categories of methods exist for the destruction of lead azide, chemical and explosive. Chemical disposal is often used for small, laboratory scale quantities and may involve a variety of methods such as ceric ammonium nitrate solutions, nitric acid solutions, or sodium chloride solutions. These methods are limited by cost and the production of harmful chemicals, including as vapors, depending on what chemical is used for the destruction.

Another method is explosion, a method once used by the United States Army Depot in Colorado in the mid 20th century, and the Iowa Army Ammunition Plant in 2026. The US Army Environmental Hygiene Agency’s own analysis of the explosive disposal following detonation found airborne lead concentrations did not rise above 0.8mg/m^{3}, and lead retention at the explosion site rose to a maximum of 75%. The EPA’s current National Ambient Air Quality Standard for lead is 0.15 µg/m^{3}, meaning the “0.8mg/m^{3}” figure cited by the military is roughly 5,000 times the current EPA limit.

== Production history ==
Lead azide in its pure form was first prepared by Theodor Curtius in 1891. Due to sensitivity and stability concerns, the dextrinated form of lead azide (MIL-L-3055) was developed in the 1920s and 1930s with large scale production by DuPont Co beginning in 1932. Detonator development during World War II resulted in the need for a form of lead azide with a more brisant output. RD-1333 lead azide (MIL-DTL-46225), a version of lead azide with sodium carboxymethyl cellulose as a precipitating agent, was developed to meet that need. The Vietnam War saw an accelerated need for lead azide and it was during this time that Special Purpose Lead Azide (MIL-L-14758) was developed; the US government also began stockpiling lead azide in large quantities. After the Vietnam War, the use of lead azide dramatically decreased. Due to the size of the US stockpile, the manufacture of lead azide in the US ceased completely by the early 1990s. In the 2000s, concerns about the age and stability of stockpiled lead azide led the US government to investigate methods to dispose of its stockpiled lead azide and obtain new manufacturers.

== Explosive characteristics ==
Lead azide is highly sensitive and usually handled and stored under water in insulated rubber containers. It will explode after a fall of around 150 mm (6 in) or in the presence of a static discharge of 7 millijoules. Its detonation velocity is around 5,180 m/s (17,000 ft/s).

Ammonium acetate and sodium dichromate are used to destroy small quantities of lead azide.

Lead azide has immediate deflagration to detonation transition (DDT), meaning that even small amounts undergo full detonation (after being hit by flame or static electricity).

Lead azide reacts with copper, zinc, cadmium, or alloys containing these metals to form other azides. For example, copper azide is even more explosive and too sensitive to be used commercially.

Lead azide was a component of the six .22 (5.6 mm) caliber Devastator rounds fired from a Röhm RG-14 revolver by John Hinckley Jr. in his assassination attempt on U.S. President Ronald Reagan on March 30, 1981. The rounds consisted of lead azide centers with lacquer-sealed aluminium tips designed to explode upon impact. A strong probability exists that the bullet which struck White House press secretary James Brady in the head exploded. The remaining bullets that hit people, including the shot that hit President Reagan, did not explode.

== See also ==
- Lead styphnate
