= Lithium azide =

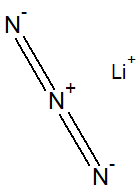

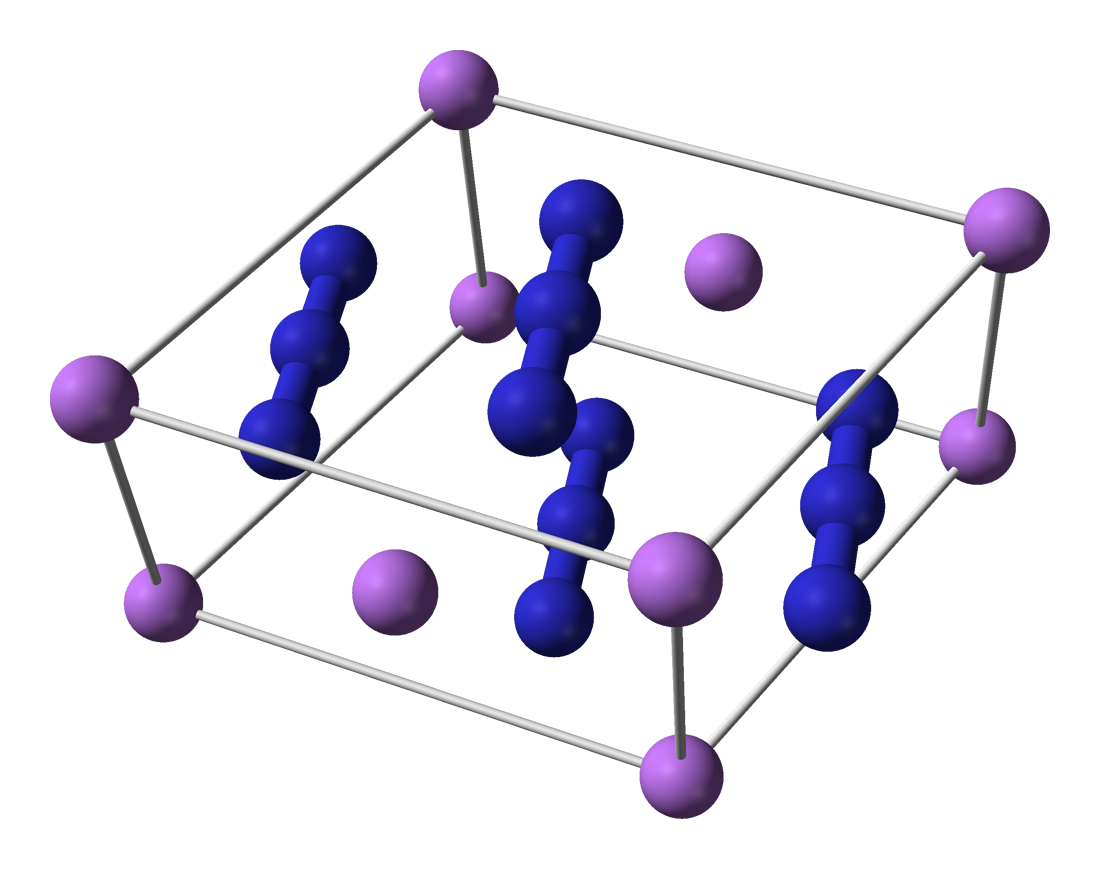
- Li^{+} N^{−}_{3} Lithium azide unit cell

Names
- IUPAC name lithium azide

Identifiers
CAS Number	19597-69-4
3D model (JSmol)	Interactive image
ChemSpider	79536
ECHA InfoCard	100.039.237
PubChem CID	88163
CompTox Dashboard (EPA)	DTXSID8066509
- InChI: InChI=1S/Li.N3/c;1-3-2/q+1;-1
- SMILES: [Li+].[N-]=[N+]=[N-]

Properties
Chemical formula	LiN_{3}
Molar mass	48.96 g·mol^{−1}
Melting point	115 °C (239 °F; 388 K)
Solubility in water	36.12 g/100 g (10 °C); 62.07 g/100 g (15.5 °C); 66.41 g/100 g (16 °C)
Solubility	20.26 g/100 g (16 °C, ethanol)

Hazards
- GHS labelling
Pictograms	(GHS01: Explosive) (GHS06: Toxic)
Safety data sheet (SDS)	External SDS
- Except where otherwise noted, data are given for materials in their standard state (at 25 °C [77 °F], 100 kPa). Infobox references

Lithium azide is the lithium salt of hydrazoic acid. It is an unstable and toxic compound that decomposes into lithium and nitrogen when heated.

== Preparation ==
It can be prepared by metathesis reaction between sodium azide and lithium nitrate or lithium sulfate solutions:

NaN_{3} + LiNO_{3} → LiN_{3} + NaNO_{3}
2 NaN_{3} + Li_{2}SO_{4} → 2 LiN_{3} + Na_{2}SO_{4}

It can also be prepared by reacting lithium sulfate with barium azide.

Ba(N_{3})_{2} + Li_{2}SO_{4} → 2 LiN_{3} + BaSO_{4}
