= Silver azide =

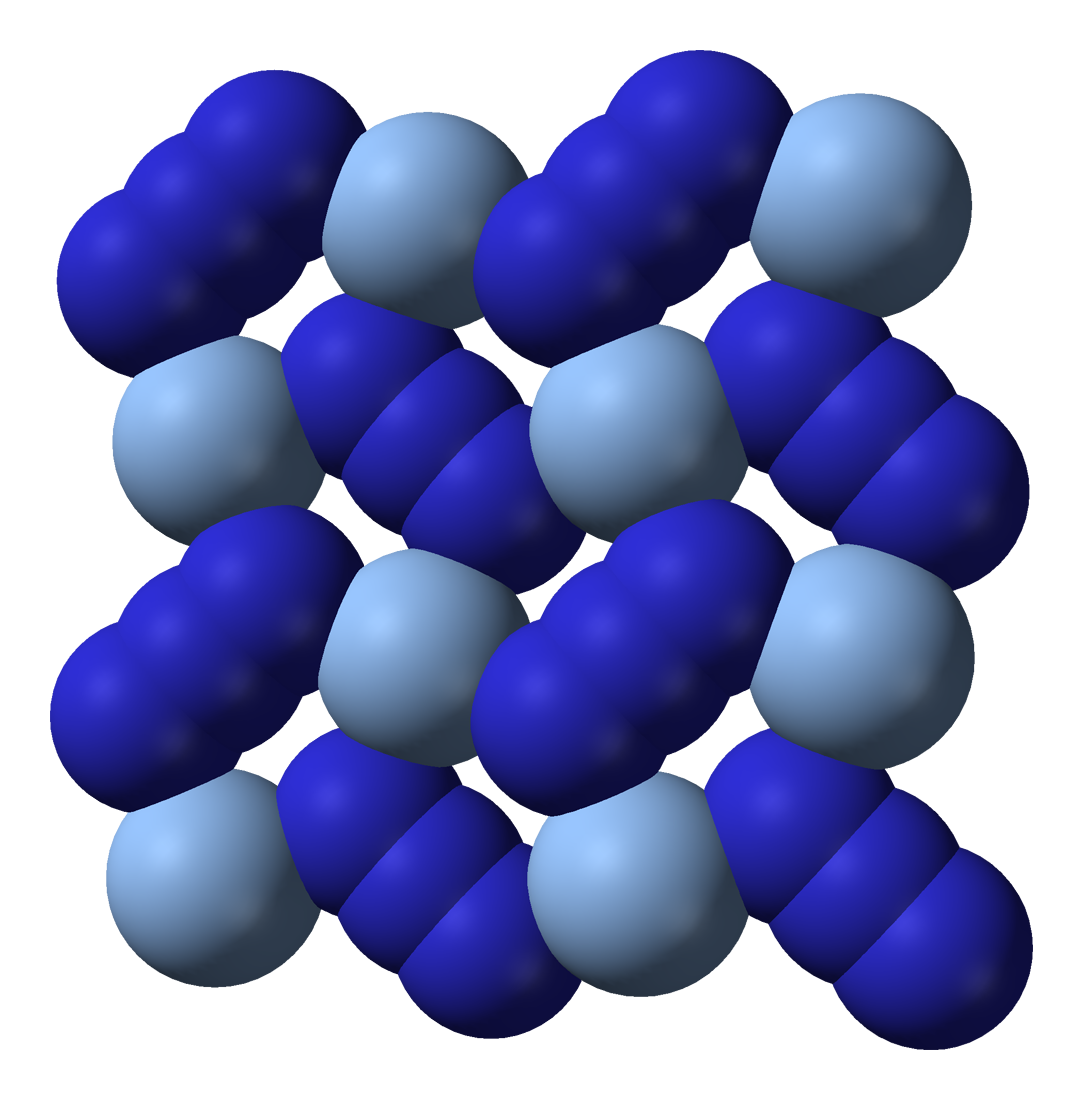

Names
- IUPAC name Silver(I) azide
- Other names Argentous azide

Identifiers
CAS Number	13863-88-2
3D model (JSmol)	Interactive image
ChemSpider	55601
ECHA InfoCard	100.034.173
PubChem CID	61698
UNII	H85PJD8U4L
CompTox Dashboard (EPA)	DTXSID70894852
- InChI: InChI=1S/Ag.N3/c;1-3-2/q+1;-1 Key: QBFXQJXHEPIJKW-UHFFFAOYSA-N; InChI=1/Ag.N3/c;1-3-2/q+1;-1 Key: QBFXQJXHEPIJKW-UHFFFAOYAJ; InChI=1S/Ag.N3/c;1-3-2/q+1;-1 Key: QBFXQJXHEPIJKW-UHFFFAOYSA-N
- SMILES: [Ag+].[N-]=[N+]=[N-]

Properties
Chemical formula	AgN_{3}
Molar mass	149.888 g/mol
Appearance	colorless crystals
Density	4.42 g/cm^{3}
Melting point	250 °C (482 °F; 523 K) explosive
Boiling point	decomposes
Solubility in other solvents	2.0×10^{−8} g/L

Structure
Crystal structure	Orthorhombic oI16
Space group	Ibam, No 72

Hazards
- Occupational safety and health (OHS/OSH)
Main hazards	Very toxic, explosive
NFPA 704 (fire diamond)	3 0 4
- Except where otherwise noted, data are given for materials in their standard state (at 25 °C [77 °F], 100 kPa). verify (what is ?) Infobox references

Silver azide is the chemical compound with the formula AgN_{3}. It is a silver(I) salt of hydrazoic acid. It forms colorless crystals. Like most azides, it is a primary explosive.

== Structure and chemistry ==
Silver azide can be prepared by treating an aqueous solution of silver nitrate with sodium azide. The silver azide precipitates as a white solid, leaving sodium nitrate in solution.

AgNO_{3}(aq) + NaN_{3}(aq) → AgN_{3}(s) + NaNO_{3}(aq)

X-ray crystallography shows that AgN_{3} is a coordination polymer with square planar Ag^{+} coordinated by four azide ligands. Correspondingly, each end of each azide ligand is connected to a pair of Ag^{+} centers. The structure consists of two-dimensional AgN_{3} layers stacked one on top of the other, with weaker Ag–N bonds between layers. The coordination of Ag^{+} can alternatively be described as highly distorted 4 + 2 octahedral, the two more distant nitrogen atoms being part of the layers above and below.

Part of a layer	Layer stacking	4 + 2 coordination of Ag^{+}	2 + 1 coordination of N in N^{−}_{3}

In its most characteristic reaction, the solid decomposes explosively, releasing nitrogen gas:

2 AgN_{3}(s) → 3 N_{2}(g) + 2 Ag(s)

The first step in this decomposition is the production of free electrons and azide radicals; thus the reaction rate is increased by the addition of semiconducting oxides. Pure silver azide explodes at 340 °C, but the presence of impurities lowers this down to 270 °C. This reaction has a lower activation energy and initial delay than the corresponding decomposition of lead azide.

== Safety ==
AgN_{3}, like most heavy metal azides, is a dangerous primary explosive. Decomposition can be triggered by exposure to ultraviolet light or by impact. Ceric ammonium nitrate [NH_{4}]_{2}[Ce(NO_{3})_{6}] is used as an oxidising agent to destroy AgN_{3} in spills.

== See also ==
- Silver nitride
