= Potassium azide =

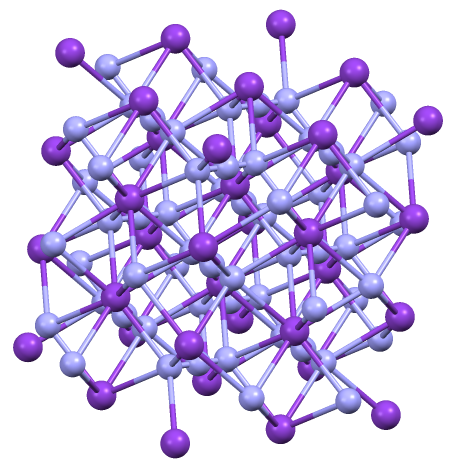

Names
- IUPAC name Potassium azide

Identifiers
CAS Number	20762-60-1
3D model (JSmol)	Interactive image
ChemSpider	8466209
ECHA InfoCard	100.039.997
EC Number	244-013-1
PubChem CID	10290740
UNII	J3LSB2C8SO
CompTox Dashboard (EPA)	DTXSID9040267
- InChI: InChI=1S/K.N3/c;1-3-2/q+1;-1 Key: TZLVRPLSVNESQC-UHFFFAOYSA-N
- SMILES: [N-]=[N+]=[N-].[K+]

Properties
Chemical formula	KN_{3}
Molar mass	81.119 g·mol^{−1}
Appearance	Colorless crystals
Density	2.038 g/cm^{3}
Melting point	350 °C (662 °F; 623 K) (in vacuum)
Boiling point	decomposes
Solubility in water	41.4 g/100 mL (0 °C); 50.8 g/100 mL (20 °C); 105.7 g/100 mL (100 °C)
Solubility	0.1375 g/100 g in ethanol (16 °C) insoluble in ether

Thermochemistry
Std enthalpy of formation (Δ_{f}H^{⦵}_{298})	−1.7 kJ/mol

Hazards
- Occupational safety and health (OHS/OSH)
Main hazards	Very Toxic, explosive if strongly heated
NFPA 704 (fire diamond)	4 3 3
- Lethal dose or concentration (LD, LC)
LD_{50} (median dose)	27 mg/kg (oral, rat)

Related compounds
Other cations	Sodium azide, copper(II) azide, lead(II) azide, silver azide
- Except where otherwise noted, data are given for materials in their standard state (at 25 °C [77 °F], 100 kPa). verify (what is ?) Infobox references

Potassium azide is the inorganic compound having the formula KN_{3}. It is a white, water-soluble salt. It is used as a reagent in the laboratory.

It has been found to act as a nitrification inhibitor in soil.

== Structure ==
KN_{3}, RbN_{3}, CsN_{3}, and TlN_{3} adopt the same structures. They crystallize in a tetragonal habit. The azide is bound to eight cations in an eclipsed orientation. The cations are bound to eight terminal N centers.

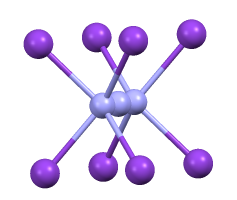
Coordination sphere of azide in K,Rb,Cs,TlN_{3}

== Synthesis and reactions ==
KN_{3} is prepared by treating potassium carbonate with hydrazoic acid, which is generated in situ. In contrast, the analogous sodium azide is prepared (industrially) by the "Wislicenus process," which proceeds via the reaction sodium amide with nitrous oxide.

Upon heating or upon irradiation with ultraviolet light, it decomposes into potassium metal and nitrogen gas. The decomposition temperatures of the alkali metal azides are: NaN_{3} (275 °C), KN_{3} (355 °C), RbN_{3} (395 °C), CsN_{3} (390 °C).

Under high pressures and high temperatures, potassium azide was found to transform into the K_{2}N_{6} and K_{9}N_{56} compounds, both containing hexazine rings: N^{2−}_{6} and N_{6}^{4-}, respectively.

== Health hazards ==
Like sodium azide, potassium azide is very toxic. The threshold limit value of the related sodium azide is 0.07 ppm. The toxicity of azides arise from their ability to inhibit cytochrome c oxidase.
