= Azide =

Anion and chemical group (–N3)

The azide anion

In chemistry, azide (/ˈeɪzaɪd/, AY-zyd) is a linear, polyatomic anion with the formula N^{−}_{3} and structure ^{−}N=N^{+}=N^{−}. It is the conjugate base of hydrazoic acid HN_{3}. Organic azides are organic compounds with the formula RN_{3}, containing the azide functional group. The dominant application of azides is as a propellant in air bags.

== Preparation ==
Sodium azide is made industrially by the reaction of nitrous oxide (N_{2}O) with sodium amide (NaNH_{2}) in liquid ammonia as solvent:

N_{2}O + 2 NaNH_{2} → NaN_{3} + NaOH + NH_{3}

Many inorganic azides can be prepared directly or indirectly from sodium azide. For example, lead azide, used in detonators, may be prepared from the metathesis reaction between lead nitrate and sodium azide. An alternative route is direct reaction of the metal with silver azide dissolved in liquid ammonia. Some azides are produced by treating the carbonate salts with hydrazoic acid.

== Bonding ==
Azide has a linear structure and is isoelectronic with carbon dioxide (CO_{2}), cyanate (OCN^{−}), nitrous oxide (N_{2}O), nitronium ion (NO^{+}_{2}), molecular beryllium fluoride (BeF_{2}) and cyanogen fluoride FCN. Per valence bond theory, azide can be described by several resonance structures; an important one being N^{−}=N^{+}=N^{−}. The analogous neutral trinitrogen molecule can also have a linear structure, but also a cyclic isomer is known.

== Reactions ==
Azide salts can decompose with release of nitrogen gas. The decomposition temperatures of the alkali metal azides are NaN_{3} (275 °C), KN_{3} (355 °C), RbN_{3} (395 °C), and CsN_{3} (390 °C). This method is used to produce ultrapure alkali metals:

2 MN_{3} 2 M + 3 N_{2}

Protonation of azide salts gives toxic and explosive hydrazoic acid in the presence of strong acids:

H^{+} + N^{−}_{3} → HN_{3}

Azide as a ligand forms numerous transition metal azide complexes. Some such compounds are shock sensitive.

Many inorganic covalent azides (e.g., fluorine azide, chlorine azide, bromine azide, iodine azide and silicon tetraazide) have been described.

The azide anion behaves as a nucleophile; it undergoes nucleophilic substitution for both aliphatic and aromatic systems. It reacts with epoxides, causing a ring-opening; it undergoes Michael-like conjugate addition to 1,4-unsaturated carbonyl compounds.

Azides can be used as precursors of the metal nitrido complexes by being induced to release N_{2}, generating a metal complex in unusual oxidation states (see high-valent iron).

=== Redox behaviour and trend to disproportionation ===
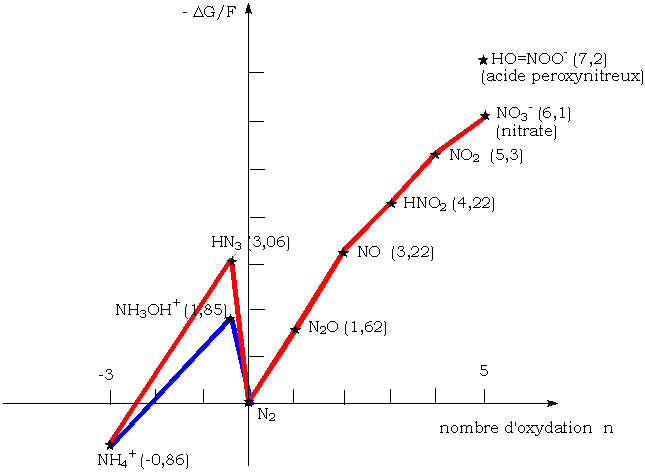
Frost diagram for nitrogen species at pH = 0

Azides have an ambivalent redox behavior: they are both oxidizing and reducing, as they are easily subject to disproportionation, as illustrated by the Frost diagram of nitrogen. This diagram shows the significant energetic instability of the hydrazoic acid HN_{3} (or the azide ion) surrounded by two much more stable species, the ammonium ion NH^{+}_{4} on the left and the molecular nitrogen N_{2} on the right. As seen on the Frost diagram the disproportionation reaction lowers ∆G, the Gibbs free energy of the system (−∆G/F = zE, where F is the Faraday constant, z the number of electrons exchanged in the redox reaction, and E the standard electrode potential). By minimizing the energy in the system, the disproportionation reaction increases its thermodynamical stability.

=== Destruction by oxidation by nitrite ===
Azides decompose with nitrite compounds such as sodium nitrite. Each elementary redox reaction is also a comproportionation reaction because two different nitrogen species (N^{−}_{3} and NO^{−}_{2}) converge to a same one (respectively N_{2}, N_{2}O and NO) and is favored when the solution is acidified. This is a method of destroying residual azides, prior to disposal. In the process, nitrogen gas (N_{2}) and nitrogen oxides (N_{2}O and NO) are formed:

3 N^{−}_{3} + NO^{−}_{2} + 2 H_{2}O → 5 N_{2} + 4 OH^{−}

2 N^{−}_{3} + 4 NO^{−}_{2} + 3 H_{2}O → 5 N_{2}O + 6 OH^{−}

N^{−}_{3} + 7 NO^{−}_{2} + 4 H_{2}O → 10 NO + 8 OH^{−}

(The parenthetical notation below marks the oxidation state of the nitrogen in each species.)

Azide (−1/3) (the reductant, electron donor) is oxidized in N_{2} (0), nitrous oxide (N_{2}O) (+1), or nitric oxide (NO) (+2) while nitrite (+3) (the oxidant, electron acceptor) is simultaneously reduced to the same corresponding species in each elementary redox reaction considered here above. The respective stability of the reaction products of these three comproportionation redox reactions is in the following order: N_{2} > N_{2}O > NO, as can be verified in the Frost diagram for nitrogen.

== Applications ==
In 2005, about 251 tonnes of azide-containing compounds were annually produced in the world, the main product being sodium azide.

=== Primary explosives and propellants ===
Sodium azide NaN_{3} is the propellant in automobile airbags. It decomposes on heating to give nitrogen gas, which is used to quickly expand the air bag:

2 NaN_{3} → 2 Na + 3 N_{2}

Heavy metal azides, such as lead azide, Pb(N_{3})_{2}, are shock-sensitive detonators which violently decompose to the corresponding metal and nitrogen, for example:

Pb(N_{3})_{2} → Pb + 3 N_{2}

Silver azide AgN_{3} and barium azide Ba(N_{3})_{2} are used similarly.

Some organic azides are potential rocket propellants, an example being 2-dimethylaminoethylazide (DMAZ) (CH_{3})_{2}NCH_{2}CH_{2}N_{3}.

=== Microbial inhibitor ===
Sodium azide is commonly used in the laboratory as a bacteriostatic agent to avoid microbial proliferation in abiotic control experiments. However, it can trigger unexpected and undesirable side reactions, as the azide anion is a nucleophile and a redox-active species. Being prone to disproportionation, it can behave both as an oxidizing and as a reducing agent. Therefore, it is susceptible to interfere in an unpredictable way with many substances. For example, the azide anion can oxidize pyrite (FeS_{2}) with the formation of thiosulfate (S_{2}O^{2−}_{3}), or reduce quinone into hydroquinone. It can also reduce nitrite (NO^{−}_{2}) into nitrous oxide (N_{2}O), and Fe^{2+} into Fe^{0} (zerovalent iron, ZVI). Azide can also enhance the N_{2}O emission in soil. A proposed explanation is the stimulation of the denitrification processes because of the azide’s role in the synthesis of denitrifying enzymes. Moreover, azide also affects the absorbance and fluorescence optical properties of the dissolved organic matter (DOM) from soils. Many other interferences are reported in the literature for biochemical and biological analyses.

=== Purification of molten sodium ===
Sodium azide NaN_{3} is used to purify metallic sodium used as a coolant for fast-neutron reactors.

As hydrazoic acid, the protonated form of the azide anion, has a very low reduction potential (E°_{red} = −3.09 V), and is even a stronger reductant than lithium (E°_{red} = −3.04 V), dry solid sodium azide can be added to molten metallic sodium (E°_{red} = −2.71 V) under strict anoxic conditions (e.g. in a special anaerobic glovebox with very low residual O_{2} (< 1 ppm vol.)) to reduce Na^{+} impurities still present into the sodium bath. The reaction residue is only gaseous N_{2}.

As E°_{ox} = −E°_{red}, the following series of oxidation reactions result when the redox couples are presented as reductants:

- 2 HN_{3} ⇌ 3 N_{2}(g) + 2 H^{+} + 2 e^{−} (E°_{ox} = +3.09 V)
- Li ⇌ Li^{+} + e^{−} (E°_{ox} = +3.04 V)
- Na ⇌ Na^{+} + e^{−} (E°_{ox} = +2.71 V)

=== Click chemistry ===
The azide functional group is commonly utilized in click chemistry through copper(I)-catalyzed azide-alkyne cycloaddition (CuAAC) reactions, where copper(I) catalyzes the cycloaddition of an organoazide to a terminal alkyne, forming a triazole.

=== Photoaffinity labeling and optotargeting ===
The azide functional group is decomposed upon illumination and is converted into molecular nitrogen (N_{2}) and a reactive radical (such as nitrene); therefore, it is also used to render organic molecules photoactivable. If a bioactive molecule is modified this way, the radical generated from it by light can be used for photoaffinity labeling and optotargeting (based on the phenomenon that the eye, especially the retina, is exposed to more light than other internal organs of the body).

=== Other uses ===
A very damaging and illegal usage of sodium azide is its diversion by poachers as a substitute of sodium cyanide to poison some animal species by blocking the electron transport chain in the cellular respiration process.

== Safety ==
Azides are explosophores and respiratory poisons. Sodium azide (NaN_{3}) is nearly as toxic as sodium cyanide (NaCN) (with an oral LD_{50} of 27 mg/kg in rats) and can be absorbed through the skin. When sodium azide enters in contact with an acid, it produces volatile hydrazoic acid (HN_{3}), as toxic and volatile as hydrogen cyanide (HCN). When accidentally present in the air of a laboratory at low concentration, it can cause irritations such as nasal stuffiness, or suffocation and death at elevated concentrations. The toxicology mechanism is in part similar to cyanide, as it causes cytochrome C oxidase inhibition, although azide also causes in vivo nitric oxide generation, leading to hypotension, myocardial and respiratory failure, and metabolic acidosis.

Heavy metal azides, such as lead azide (Pb(N_{3})_{2}) are primary high explosives that are detonable when heated or shaken. Heavy-metal azides are formed when solutions of sodium azide or HN_{3} vapors come into contact with heavy metals (such as lead or mercury) or their salts. Heavy-metal azides can accumulate under certain circumstances, for example, in metal pipelines and on the metal components of diverse equipment (rotary evaporators, freezedrying equipment, cooling traps, water baths, waste pipes), and thus lead to violent explosions.

== See also ==
- Main group azido compounds
- Pentazenium
- Pentazolate (cyclo-N^{−}_{5})
