= Sodium azide =

Chemical compound

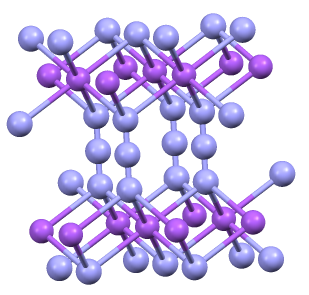

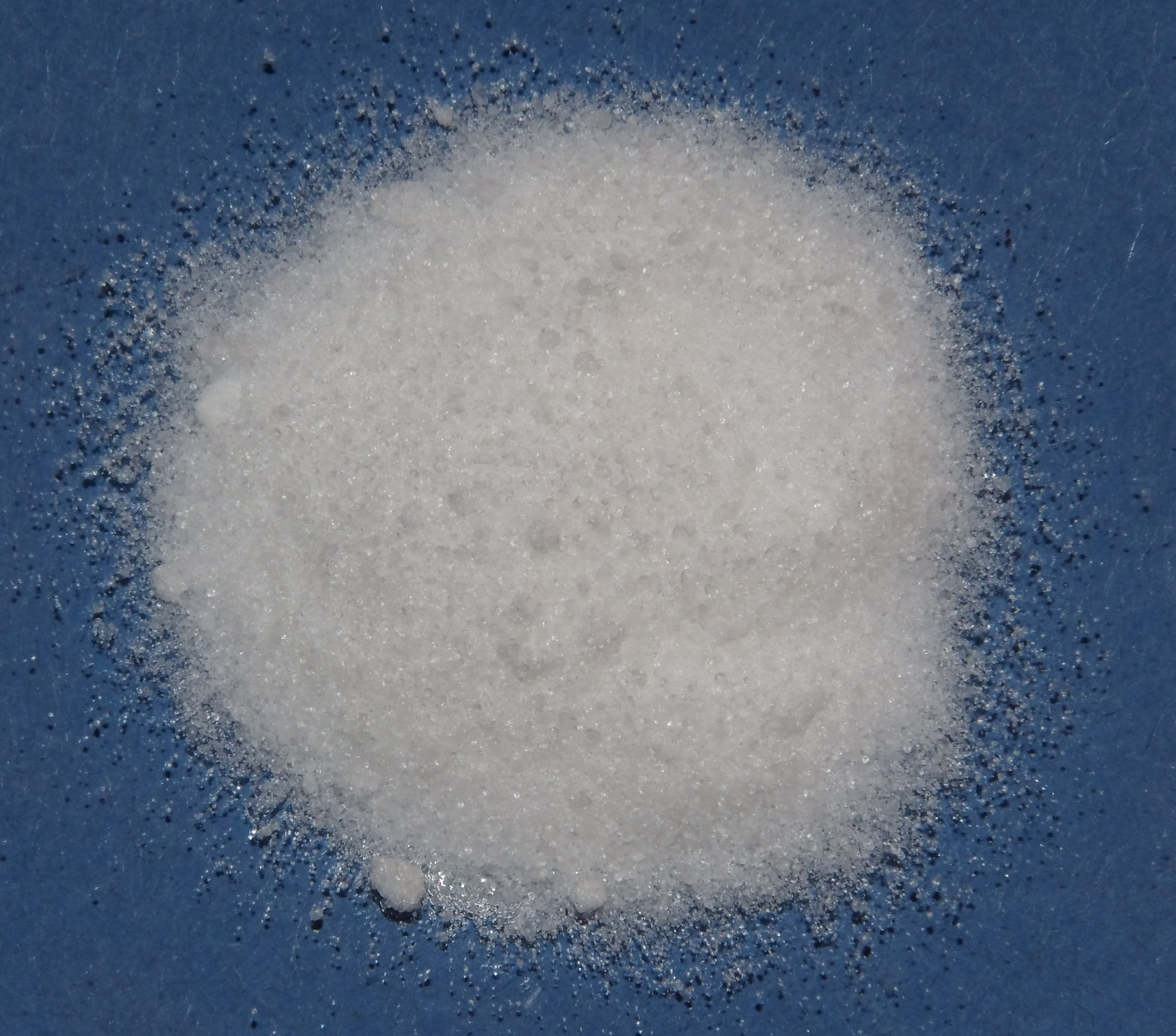

Names
- IUPAC name Sodium azide
- Other names Sodium trinitride Smite; Azium

Identifiers
CAS Number	26628-22-8
3D model (JSmol)	Interactive image
ChEBI	CHEBI:278547
ChEMBL	ChEMBL89295
ChemSpider	30958
ECHA InfoCard	100.043.487
EC Number	247-852-1
PubChem CID	33557
RTECS number	VY8050000
UNII	968JJ8C9DV
UN number	1687
CompTox Dashboard (EPA)	DTXSID8020121
- InChI: InChI=1S/N3.Na/c1-3-2;/q-1;+1 Key: PXIPVTKHYLBLMZ-UHFFFAOYSA-N; InChI=1/N3.Na/c1-3-2;/q-1;+1 Key: PXIPVTKHYLBLMZ-UHFFFAOYAH
- SMILES: [N-]=[N+]=[N-].[Na+]

Properties
Chemical formula	NaN_{3}
Molar mass	65.0099 g/mol
Appearance	Colorless to white solid
Odor	Odorless
Density	1.846 g/cm^{3} (20 °C)
Melting point	275 °C (527 °F; 548 K) violent decomposition
Solubility in water	38.9 g/100 mL (0 °C); 40.8 g/100 mL (20 °C); 55.3 g/100 mL (100 °C)
Solubility	Very soluble in ammonia Slightly soluble in benzene Insoluble in diethyl ether, acetone, hexane, chloroform
Solubility in methanol	2.48 g/100 mL (25 °C)
Solubility in ethanol	0.22 g/100 mL (0 °C)
Acidity (pK_{a})	4.8

Structure
Crystal structure	Hexagonal, hR12
Space group	R-3m, No. 166

Thermochemistry
Heat capacity (C)	76.6 J/mol·K
Std molar entropy (S^{⦵}_{298})	70.5 J/mol·K
Std enthalpy of formation (Δ_{f}H^{⦵}_{298})	21.3 kJ/mol
Gibbs free energy (Δ_{f}G^{⦵})	99.4 kJ/mol

Hazards
- GHS labelling
Pictograms	(GHS01: Explosive) (GHS06: Toxic) (GHS08: Health hazard) (GHS09: Environmental hazard)
Signal word	Danger
Hazard statements	H300, H310, H410
Precautionary statements	P260, P280, P301+P310, P501
NFPA 704 (fire diamond)	4 1 3
Flash point	300 °C (572 °F; 573 K)
- Lethal dose or concentration (LD, LC)
LD_{50} (median dose)	27 mg/kg (oral, rats/mice)
- NIOSH (US health exposure limits)
PEL (Permissible)	None
REL (Recommended)	C 0.1 ppm (as HN_{3}) [skin] C 0.3 mg/m^{3} (as NaN_{3}) [skin]
IDLH (Immediate danger)	N.D.
Safety data sheet (SDS)	ICSC 0950

Related compounds
Other anions	Sodium cyanide
Other cations	Potassium azide Ammonium azide
- Except where otherwise noted, data are given for materials in their standard state (at 25 °C [77 °F], 100 kPa). verify (what is ?) Infobox references

Sodium azide is an inorganic compound with the formula NaN_{3}. This colorless salt is the gas-forming component in some car airbag systems. It is used for the preparation of other azide compounds. It is highly soluble in water and is acutely poisonous.

== Structure ==
Sodium azide is an ionic solid. Two crystalline forms are known, rhombohedral and hexagonal. Both adopt layered structures. The azide anion is very similar in each form, being centrosymmetric with N–N distances of 1.18 Å. The Na^{+} ion has an octahedral geometry. Each azide is linked to six Na^{+} center ions, with three Na–N bonds to each terminal nitrogen center.

== Preparation ==
The common synthesis method is the "Wislicenus process", which proceeds in two steps in liquid ammonia. In the first step, ammonia is converted to sodium amide by metallic sodium:

2 Na + 2 NH_{3} → 2 NaNH_{2} + H_{2}

The sodium amide is subsequently combined with nitrous oxide:

2 NaNH_{2} + N_{2}O → NaN_{3} + NaOH + NH_{3}

These reactions are the basis of the industrial route, which produces about 250 tons per year in 2004, with production increasing due to the increased use of airbags.

=== Laboratory methods ===
Curtius and Thiele developed another production process, where a nitrite ester is converted to sodium azide using hydrazine. This method is suited for laboratory preparation of sodium azide:

2 NaNO_{2} + 2 C_{2}H_{5}OH + H_{2}SO_{4} → 2 C_{2}H_{5}ONO + Na_{2}SO_{4} + 2 H_{2}O
C_{2}H_{5}ONO + N_{2}H_{4}·H_{2}O + NaOH → NaN_{3} + C_{2}H_{5}OH + 3 H_{2}O

Alternatively the salt can be obtained by the reaction of sodium nitrate with sodium amide.

3 NaNH_{2} + NaNO_{3} → NaN_{3} + 3 NaOH + NH_{3}

== Chemical reactions ==
=== Acid formation of hydrazoic acid ===
Treatment of sodium azide with strong acids gives hydrazoic acid (hydrogen azide; HN_{3}):

H^{+} + N^{−}_{3} → HN_{3}

Hydrazoic acid, which is also extremely toxic, is especially dangerous because it is a volatile liquid at room temperature. Otherwise, aqueous solutions contain only minute amounts of hydrazoic acid, as described by the following equilibrium reaction:

N^{−}_{3} + H_{2}O ⇌ HN_{3} + OH^{−}, K = 10^{−4.6}

=== Destruction ===
Sodium azide can be destroyed by treatment with nitrous acid (HNO_{2}) generated in situ from a solution of NaN_{3} with a metal nitrite by acidification with a mineral acid.

2 NaN_{3} + 2 HNO_{2} → 3 N_{2} + 2 NO + 2 NaOH

A safer modification to the above method that avoids the potential production of hydrazoic acid or nitrogen oxide fumes is that of W. F. Rinkenbach. A solution of 2.5 oz (71 g) sodium nitrite in 1 US pt (470 mL) of water is added to a stirring dispersion of 1 oz (28 g) sodium azide in 1.5 US gal (5.7 L) 10% ammonium acetate, followed by addition of 7 US fl oz (210 mL) of glacial acetic acid. The solution is allowed to stand in a warm place for an hour and disposed of.

== Applications ==
=== Automobile airbags and aircraft evacuation slides ===
Airbag formulations through late 1990s to early 2000s contained mixtures of oxidizers, sodium azide and other agents including ignitors and accelerants. An electronic controller detonates this mixture during an automobile crash:

2 NaN_{3} → 2 Na + 3 N_{2}

The same reaction occurs upon heating the salt to approximately 300 °C. The sodium that is formed is a potential hazard alone and, in automobile airbags, it is converted by reaction with other ingredients, such as potassium nitrate and silica. In the latter case, innocuous sodium silicates are generated. While sodium azide is still used in evacuation slides on modern aircraft, newer-generation automotive air bags contain less sensitive explosives such as nitroguanidine or guanidine nitrate.

=== Organic and inorganic synthesis ===
Due to its explosion hazard, sodium azide is of only limited value in industrial-scale organic synthesis. In the laboratory, it is used to introduce the azide functional group by displacement of halides. The azide functional group can thereafter be converted to an amine by reduction with either SnCl_{2} in ethanol or lithium aluminium hydride or a tertiary phosphine, such as triphenylphosphine in the Staudinger reaction, with Raney nickel or with hydrogen sulfide in pyridine. Oseltamivir, an antiviral medication, is currently produced in commercial scale by a method which utilizes sodium azide.

Sodium azide is a versatile precursor to other inorganic azide compounds, e.g., lead azide and silver azide, which are used in detonators as primary explosives. These azides are significantly more sensitive to premature detonation than sodium azide and thus have limited applications. Lead and silver azide can be made via double displacement reaction with sodium azide and their respective nitrate (most commonly) or acetate salts. Sodium azide also can react with the chloride salts of certain alkaline earth metals in aqueous solution, such as barium chloride or strontium chloride to respectively produce barium azide and strontium azide, which are also relatively sensitive primarily explosive materials. These azides can be recovered from solution through careful desiccation.

=== Biochemistry and biomedical uses ===
Sodium azide is a useful probe reagent, and an antibacterial preservative for biochemical solutions. In the past merthiolate and chlorobutanol were also used as an alternative to azide for preservation of biochemical solutions.

Sodium azide is an instantaneous inhibitor of lactoperoxidase, which can be useful to stop lactroperoxidase catalyzed ^{125}I protein radiolabeling experiments.

In hospitals and laboratories, it is a biocide; it is especially important in bulk reagents and stock solutions which may otherwise support bacterial growth where the sodium azide acts as a bacteriostatic by inhibiting cytochrome oxidase in gram-negative bacteria; however, some gram-positive bacteria (streptococci, pneumococci, lactobacilli) are intrinsically resistant.

=== Agricultural uses ===
It is used in agriculture for pest control of soil-borne pathogens such as Meloidogyne incognita or Helicotylenchus dihystera.

It is also used as a mutagen for crop selection of plants such as rice, barley or oats.

== Safety considerations ==
Sodium azide can be fatally toxic, and even minute amounts can cause symptoms. The toxicity of this compound is comparable to that of soluble alkali cyanides, although no toxicity has been reported from spent airbags.

It produces extrapyramidal symptoms with necrosis of the cerebral cortex, cerebellum, and basal ganglia. Toxicity may also include hypotension, blindness and hepatic necrosis. Sodium azide increases cyclic GMP levels in the brain and liver by activation of guanylate cyclase.

Sodium azide solutions react with metallic ions to precipitate metal azides, which can be shock sensitive and explosive. This should be considered for choosing a non-metallic transport container for sodium azide solutions in the laboratory. This can also create potentially dangerous situations if azide solutions should be directly disposed down the drain into a sanitary sewer system. Metal in the plumbing system could react, forming highly sensitive metal azide crystals which could accumulate over years. Adequate precautions are necessary for the safe and environmentally responsible disposal of azide solution residues.

=== Intentional consumption ===
Sodium azide has gained attention in the Netherlands and abroad as a chemical used for homicidal and suicidal purposes.

Sodium azide has been attributed to at least 172 deaths in the period from 2015 to 2022 as part of an illicit substance used as a suicide aid commonly called drug X (Dutch: middel X) In 2021, a review of all case reports of sodium azide intoxication indicated that 37% of cases were suicide attempts. An increase in the usage of sodium azide as a suicide drug has been attributed to its availability through pyrotechnics-focused online stores.

=== Treatment ===
The US CDC reports no specific antidote for azide poisoning. A 2021 narrative review identifies several cases of survival from ingestion when the patient is treated with antidotes for cyanide poisoning. From a mechanistic standpoint, hydroxocobalamin is more likely to be helpful than other antidotes such as sodium nitrite and sodium thiosulfate. As a result, the recommended treatment is hemodynamic support and hydroxocobalamin. First responders should use personal protection equipment to protect themselves from azide exposure.
