= Hydrazoic acid =

Unstable and toxic chemical compound

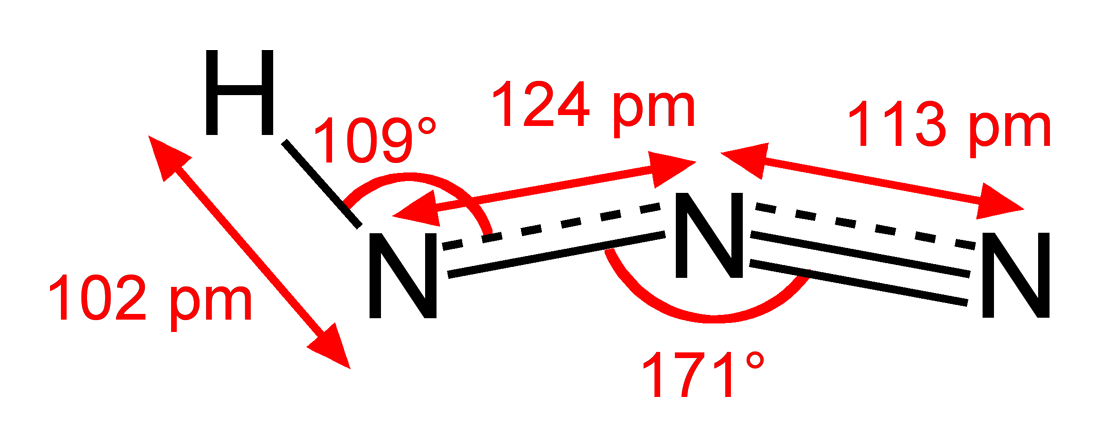
- Structure, bonding and dimensions of the hydrogen azide molecule

- Hydrazoic acid

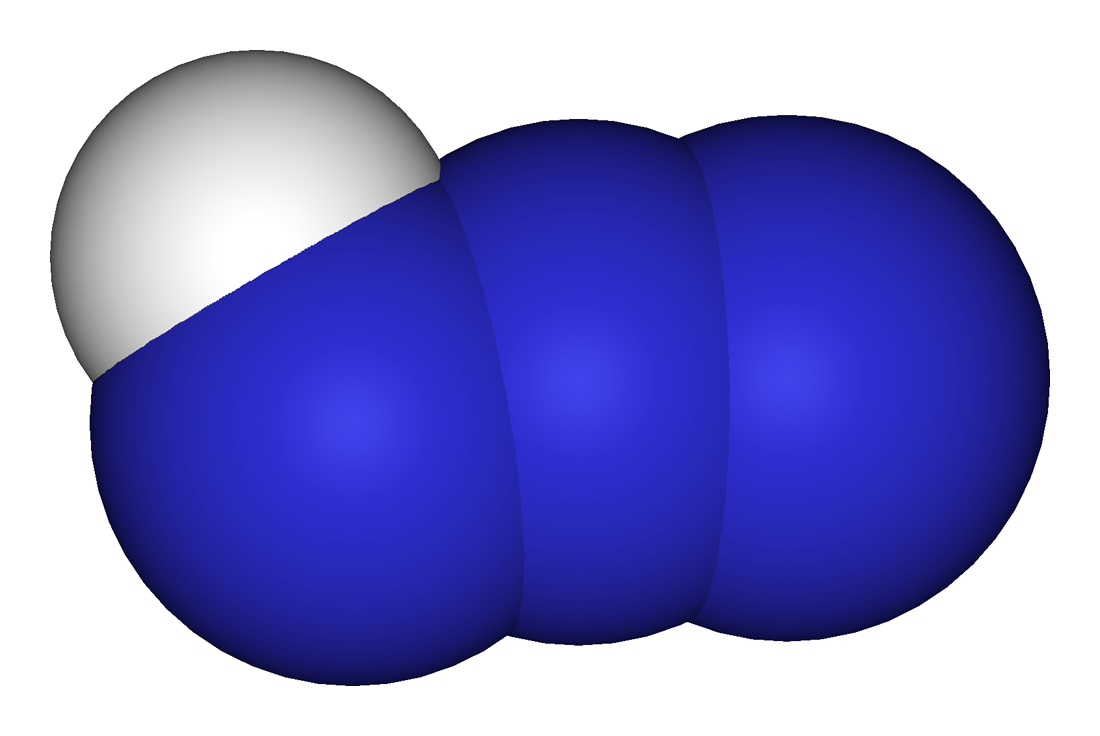
- Hydrazoic acid

Names
- IUPAC name Hydrogen azide
- Other names Hydrogen azide Azoimide

Identifiers
CAS Number	7782-79-8
3D model (JSmol)	Interactive image; Interactive image
ChEBI	CHEBI:29449
ChEMBL	ChEMBL186537
ChemSpider	22937
ECHA InfoCard	100.029.059
EC Number	231-965-8
Gmelin Reference	773
PubChem CID	24530
UNII	6P5C4D5D7I
CompTox Dashboard (EPA)	DTXSID20884425
- InChI: InChI=1S/HN3/c1-3-2/h1H Key: JUINSXZKUKVTMD-UHFFFAOYSA-N; InChI=1/HN3/c1-3-2/h1H Key: JUINSXZKUKVTMD-UHFFFAOYAO
- SMILES: [N-]=[N+]=N; N#[N+][N-H]

Properties
Chemical formula	HN_{3}
Molar mass	43.029 g·mol^{−1}
Appearance	colorless, highly volatile liquid
Density	1.09 g/cm^{3}
Melting point	−80 °C (−112 °F; 193 K)
Boiling point	37 °C (99 °F; 310 K)
Solubility in water	highly soluble
Solubility	soluble in alkali, alcohol, ether
Acidity (pK_{a})	4.6
Conjugate base	Azide

Structure
Molecular shape	approximately linear

Hazards
- Occupational safety and health (OHS/OSH)
Main hazards	Highly toxic, explosive, reactive
- GHS labelling
Pictograms	(GHS01: Explosive) (GHS07: Exclamation mark) (GHS08: Health hazard)
Signal word	Danger
Hazard statements	H200, H319, H335, H370
Precautionary statements	P201, P202, P260, P264, P270, P271, P280, P281, P304+P340, P305+P351+P338, P307+P311, P312, P321, P337+P313, P372, P373, P380, P401, P403+P233, P405, P501
NFPA 704 (fire diamond)	4 0 3

Related compounds
Other cations	Sodium azide Lithium azide Potassium azide
Related nitrogen hydrides	Ammonia; Hydrazine
- Except where otherwise noted, data are given for materials in their standard state (at 25 °C [77 °F], 100 kPa). verify (what is ?) Infobox references

Hydrazoic acid, also known as hydrogen azide or azoimide, is a compound with the chemical formula HN_{3}. It is a colorless, volatile, and explosive liquid at room temperature and pressure. It is a compound of nitrogen and hydrogen, and is therefore a pnictogen hydride. It was first isolated in 1890 by Theodor Curtius. The acid has few applications, but its conjugate base, the azide ion, is useful in specialized processes.

Hydrazoic acid, like its fellow mineral acids, is soluble in water. Undiluted hydrazoic acid is dangerously explosive with a standard enthalpy of formation (liquid, 298 K) of +264 kJ/mol. When dilute, the gas and aqueous solutions (below 10%) can be safely prepared but should be used immediately; because of its low boiling point, hydrazoic acid is enriched upon evaporation and condensation such that dilute solutions incapable of explosion can form droplets in the headspace of the container or reactor that are capable of explosion.

== Production ==
The acid is usually formed by acidification of an azide salt like sodium azide. Normally solutions of sodium azide in water contain trace quantities of hydrazoic acid in equilibrium with the azide salt, but introduction of a stronger acid can convert the primary species in solution to hydrazoic acid. The pure acid may be subsequently obtained by fractional distillation as an extremely explosive colorless liquid with an unpleasant smell.

NaN_{3} + HCl → HN_{3} + NaCl

Its aqueous solution can also be prepared by treatment of barium azide solution with dilute sulfuric acid, filtering the insoluble barium sulfate.

It was originally prepared in 4 steps:

The reaction of benzoyl glycolic acid with hydrazine, to form benzoyl hydrazine and hydrazinoacetic acid:

C_{6}H_{5}OCO·CH_{2}COOH + 2 N_{2}H_{4} → C_{6}H_{5}CONH·NH_{2} + NH_{2}·NH·CH_{2}·COOH + H_{2}O

This is reacted with nitrous acid to form a nitroso compound:

C_{6}H_{5}CONH·NH_{2} + HONO → C_{6}H_{5}CON(NO)·NH_{2} + H_{2}O

This nitroso compound spontaneously eliminates a water molecule forming benzoyl azide:

C_{6}H_{5}CON(NO)·NH_{2} → C_{6}H_{5}CON_{3} +H_{2}O

The benzoyl azide is hydrolysed with a boiling, alcoholic alkali hydroxide solution (originally ethanolic sodium hydroxide):

C_{6}H_{5}CON_{3} + 2 NaOH → C_{6}H_{5}COONa + NaN_{3} + H_{2}O

The hydrazinoacetic acid formed in step 1 can, under the same conditions, yield sodium azide.

The sodium azide can then simply be protonated with a strong acid to form hydrazoic acid.

Other oxidizing agents, such as hydrogen peroxide, nitrosyl chloride, trichloramine or nitric acid, can also be used to produce hydrazoic acid from hydrazine.

== Destruction prior to disposal ==
Hydrazoic acid reacts with nitrous acid:

HN_{3} + HNO_{2} → N_{2}O + N_{2} + H_{2}O

This reaction is unusual in that it involves compounds with nitrogen in four different oxidation states.

== Reactions ==
In its properties hydrazoic acid shows some analogy to the halogen acids, since it forms poorly soluble (in water) lead, silver and mercury(I) salts. The metallic salts all crystallize in the anhydrous form and decompose on heating, leaving a residue of the pure metal. It is a weak acid (pK_{a} = 4.75.) Its heavy metal salts are explosive and readily interact with the alkyl iodides. Azides of heavier alkali metals (excluding lithium) or alkaline earth metals are not explosive, but decompose in a more controlled way upon heating, releasing spectroscopically-pure N_{2} gas. Solutions of hydrazoic acid dissolve many metals (e.g. zinc, iron) with liberation of hydrogen and formation of salts, which are called azides (formerly also called azoimides or hydrazoates).

Hydrazoic acid may react with carbonyl derivatives, including aldehydes, ketones, and carboxylic acids, to give an amine or amide, with expulsion of nitrogen. This is called Schmidt reaction or Schmidt rearrangement.

Dissolution in the strongest acids produces explosive salts containing the aminodiazonium ion [H_{2}N=N=N]^{+} ⇌ [H_{2}N−N≡N]^{+}, for example:

HN=N=N + H[SbCl_{6}] → [H_{2}N=N=N]^{+}[SbCl_{6}]^{−}

The ion [H_{2}N=N=N]^{+} is isoelectronic to diazomethane H_{2}C=N^{+}=N^{−}.

The decomposition of hydrazoic acid, triggered by shock, friction, spark, etc. produces nitrogen and hydrogen:

2 HN_{3} → H_{2} + 3 N_{2}

Hydrazoic acid undergoes unimolecular decomposition at sufficient energy:

HN_{3} → NH + N_{2}

The lowest energy pathway produces NH in the triplet state, making it a spin-forbidden reaction. This is one of the few reactions whose rate has been determined for specific amounts of vibrational energy in the ground electronic state, by laser photodissociation studies. In addition, these unimolecular rates have been analyzed theoretically, and the experimental and calculated rates are in reasonable agreement.

== Toxicity ==
Hydrazoic acid is volatile and highly toxic, with similar toxicity to hydrogen cyanide. It has a pungent smell and its vapor can cause violent headaches. The compound acts as a non-cumulative poison. Toxicity manifests itself through the action of the azide ion, which causes cytochrome C oxidase inhibition (like cyanide) and in vivo nitric oxide generation, leading to hypotension, myocardial and respiratory failure, and metabolic acidosis.

== Applications ==
2-Furonitrile, a pharmaceutical intermediate and potential artificial sweetening agent has been prepared in good yield by treating furfural with a mixture of hydrazoic acid (HN_{3}) and perchloric acid (HClO_{4}) in the presence of magnesium perchlorate in the benzene solution at 35 °C.

The all gas-phase iodine laser (AGIL) mixes gaseous hydrazoic acid with chlorine to produce excited nitrogen chloride, which is then used to cause iodine to lase; this avoids the liquid chemistry requirements of COIL lasers.
