= NIF =

NIF or Nif may refer to:

== Localities ==
- Nif, former name of the town of Kemalpaşa in western Turkey
- Mount Nif, near Kemalpaşa, Turkey
- Nifty Airport, IATA airport code "NIF"

== Organizations and other abbreviations ==
- National Ignition Facility, a US experimental fusion facility at Lawrence Livermore National Laboratory
- National Immigration Forum, a pro-immigrant advocacy non-profit organization based in Washington, DC
- National Islamic Front, a political party of Sudan
- Nationalist and Integrationist Front of Ituri, Democratic Republic of the Congo
- Neuroscience Information Framework, a repository of global neuroscience web resources
- New Israel Fund, a U.S.-based organization that funds social justice initiatives in Israel
- National Issues Forums, a US network of organizations and individuals who sponsor public forums
- Número de Identificación Fiscal or Número de Identificação Fiscal, tax identification numbers used in Spain and Portugal, respectively
- 3D scene format of the Gamebryo/NetImmerse game engine
- NÍF Nólsoy, a former Faroese football team now known as FF Giza
- Norwegian Olympic and Paralympic Committee and Confederation of Sports, the highest governing body for sports in Norway
- Nordstrand IF, Norwegian multisports club

== Biology ==
- Nif gene
- Nif regulon
- Neuroscience Information Framework, an inventory of web-based neurosciences data, resources, and tools
- Negative inspiratory force

== Computer sciences ==
- Natural Language Programming Interchange Format

== Rail transportation ==
- New Intercity Fleet, otherwise known as D sets, an intercity train fleet in New South Wales, Australia
