= Manganese nitrides =

Salts of manganese and the nitride ion

Manganese nitrides are salts of manganese and the nitride ion. Four of these compounds are stable at atmospheric pressure. The most important is Mn_{3}N_{2}, which catalyzes nitrogen fixation and is a high-temperature antiferromagnet. The others are Mn_{6}N_{5–6}, Mn_{4}N, and Mn_{2}N. The compounds generally form as surface layer during combustion of manganese metal in nitrogen or ammonia gas, and homogenous samples can be difficult to obtain.

== Formation ==
The compounds generally form from combustion of manganese metal in nitrogen or ammonia gas, but as a passivating surface layer; consequently homogenous samples are difficult to obtain. A sufficiently activated manganese sponge results from distillation of manganese amalgam. As described in 1894, a sponge is essential to Mn_{2}N synthesis: manganese powder, if used instead, instead absorbs excess nitrogen, although the resulting nitrogen-rich salt anneals with manganese metal to the correct stoichiometry.

Alternatively, manganese(II) chloride undergoes a non–self-propagating solid state metathesis with magnesium nitride at 550 °C to form Mn_{3}N_{2}; higher temperatures or differently-sized cations give Mn_{2}N instead. Excess molten sodamide at 240 °C reduces manganese oxides to nitrides, with the final product dependent on stoichiometry, through the following reaction.

3 Mn_{2}O_{3} + 9 NaNH_{2} → 2 Mn_{3}N_{2} + 9 NaOH + N_{2} + 3 NH_{3}

The waste sodium hydroxide selectively dissolves in an aqueous ethanol wash. Manganocene ammonolyzes at 700 °C to give Mn_{3}N_{2}. Manganese azides decompose when heated to give Mn_{3}N_{2} or Mn_{6}N_{5–6} and nitrogen gas.

== Structures and properties ==
Several manganese nitrides are stable at atmospheric pressure. The most important is Mn_{3}N_{2}, which catalyzes nitrogen fixation and is a high-temperature antiferromagnet. Other salts include Mn_{6}N_{5–6}, Mn_{4}N, and Mn_{2}N. Splat quenching may also form a metastable Mn_{8}N that decomposes without diffusion. In general, no binary compounds of manganese and nitrogen are known in which manganese exhibits a formal oxidation state higher than Mn^{2+}, but manganese does form a wide variety of homoleptic nitrido complexes and ternary salts, with oxidation states ranging from Mn^{+} to Mn^{+6.5}; indeed, the stablest homoleptic complex is Li_{7}MnN_{4}.

Except for Mn_{6}N_{5–6}, manganese nitrides are generally stable against hydrolysis, but act as Brønsted bases in concentrated acid.

Nitrogen-doped manganese experiences a slight freezing point depression, with a eutectic point estimated near 1213 °C and 4 at% nitrogen. Further addition of nitrogen increases the melting point to roughly 1270 °C.

Mn_{4}N is an antiperovskite superlattice with Pearson symbol cP5 and space group Fm3̅m, the same structure as an iron nitride homologue. The cell period is 0.3864 nm, and each nitrogen atom is very nearly at the center of the cell. Any defects present are believed to be of Frenkel type. It is the only truly ferromagnetic phase in the manganese-nitride system, with a Curie temperature around 470 °C. However, dissolved hydrogen in the compound is believed to slightly increase the Curie point. The compound metamorphosizes at 890 °C to the hexagonal close-packed Mn_{2}N phase.

Despite the name, Mn_{2}N in fact exhibits substantial variation in its stable composition with temperature, and the formula Mn_{2}N is only accurate near room temperature. It becomes nitrogen-deficient when heated, with composition Mn_{5–6}N above 890 °C. These shifts in composition also correspond to a gradual change in the unit cell, such that the compound has various hexagonal unit cells at high temperatures. At its most nitrogen-rich (and coldest), though, the compound has an 0.5668×0.4909×4.537 nm^{3} orthorhombic unit cell with space group D^{14}_{2h}. Pbna. It is isostructural with Mo_{2}C.

Mn_{3}N_{2} is face-centered tetragonal, with Pearson symbol tI6 and space group I4/mmm, analogous to thorium hydride. The unit cell has periods a = 0.42046 nm and c = 1.2131 nm, corresponding to three nearly-cubic unit cells stacked atop each other, but with substantial disorder corresponding to nitrogen vacancies. It is a metallic conductor and a Pauli antiferromagnet, with Néel temperature roughly 645 °C. Around 710 °C, it reversibly decomposes to Mn_{2}N, releasing the excess nitrogen as gas and consuming 25 kJ/mol enthalpy. Likewise, it decomposes in a 400 °C hydrogen atmosphere to a body-centered cubic alloy.

Mn_{6}N_{5–6} resembles CrN. It is face-centered tetragonal like Mn_{3}N_{2}, but lacks the vacancies that cause such a large fineness ratio in the latter. Instead Mn_{6}N_{5–6} is nearly cubic. When nitrogen-poor, it has lattice parameters a = 0.42 nm and c = 0.41 nm, but the unit cell dimensions vary substantially with nitrogen content and temperature, and the material becomes truly cubic at 400 °C. Consequently it exhibits substantial crystal twinning. Around 580 °C, it decomposes to Mn_{3}N_{2} and nitrogen gas, but requires a very high nitrogen vapor pressure (even at lower temperatures) to stabilize the phase. The decomposition is somewhat reversible, recovering Mn_{6}N_{5.18} upon cooling. Between 150 °C and 325 °C, it undergoes a magnetic phase transition, aligning moments along one symmetry axis; the Néel temperature is then 387 °C.

In principle, a hexagonal MnN monolayer should exhibit very strong spin polarization, thus behaving as a very strong ferromagnet.

== See also ==
- Antiperovskite manganese nitride
