= Transition metal dinitrogen complex =

Coordination compounds with N_{2}

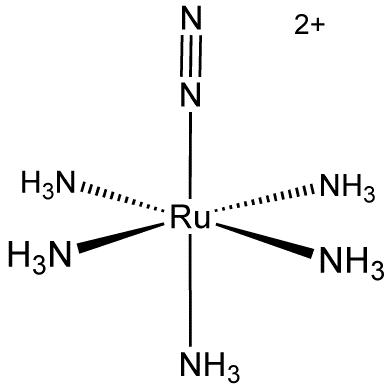
Structure of [Ru(NH_{3})_{5}(N_{2})]^{2+}.

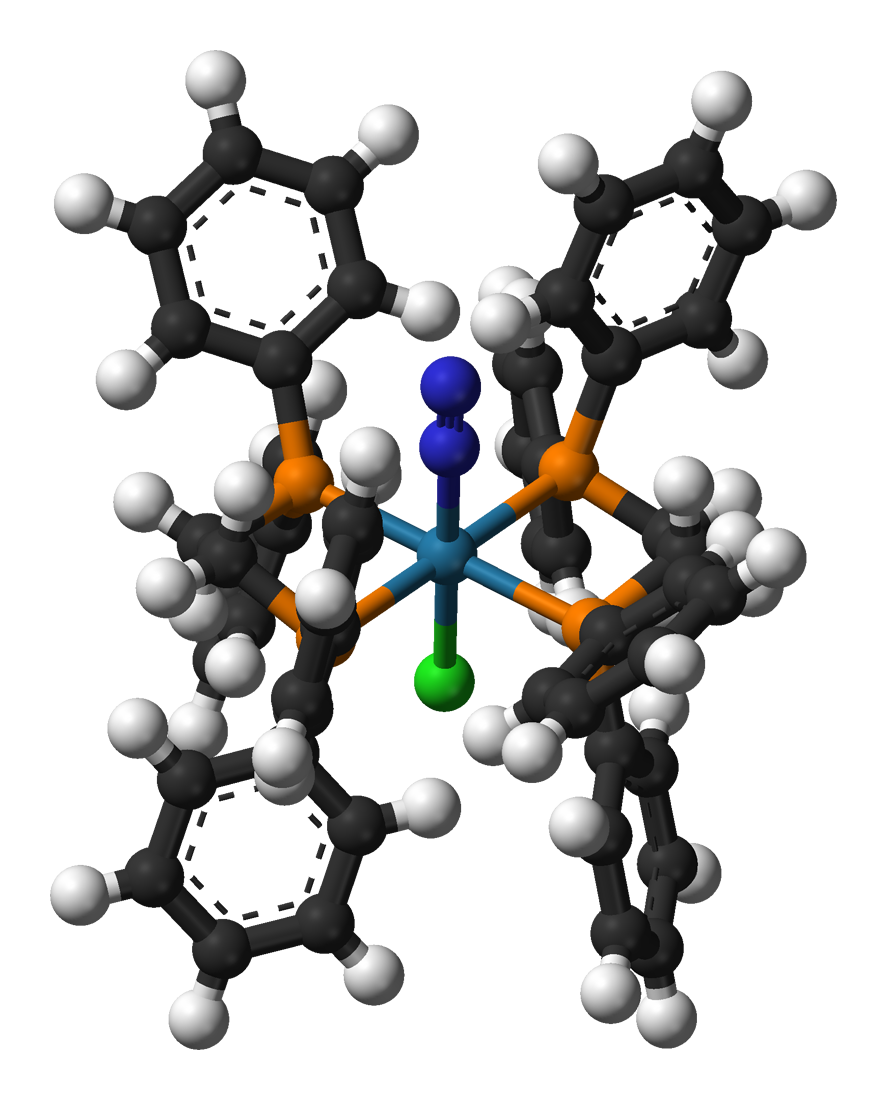
Ball-and-stick model of ReCl(dppe)_{2}N_{2}

Fe(0)-N_{2} complex.

Transition metal dinitrogen complexes are coordination compounds that contain transition metals as ion centers the dinitrogen molecules (N_{2}) as ligands.

== Historical background ==
Transition metal complexes of N_{2} have been studied since 1965 when the first complex was reported by Allen and Senoff. This diamagnetic complex, [Ru(NH_{3})_{5}(N_{2})]^{2+}, was synthesized from hydrazine hydrate and ruthenium trichloride and consists of a [Ru(NH_{3})_{5}]^{2+} centre attached to one end of N_{2}. The existence of N_{2} as a ligand in this compound was identified by IR spectrum with a strong band around 2170–2100 cm^{−1}. In 1966, the molecular structure of [Ru(NH_{3})_{5}(N_{2})]Cl_{2} was determined by Bottomly and Nyburg by X-ray crystallography.

The dinitrogen complex trans-[IrCl(N_{2})(PPh_{3})_{2}] is made by treating Vaska's complex with aromatic acyl azides. It has a planar geometry.

The first preparation of a metal-dinitrogen complex using dinitrogen was reported in 1967 by Yamamoto and coworkers. They obtained [Co(H)(N_{2})(PPh_{3})_{3}] by reduction of Co(acac)_{3} with AlEt_{2}OEt under an atmosphere of N_{2}. Containing both hydrido and N_{2} ligands, the complex was of potential relevance to nitrogen fixation.

From the late 1960s, a variety of transition metal-dinitrogen complexes were made including those with iron, molybdenum and vanadium as metal centers. Interest in such complexes arises because N_{2} comprises the majority of the atmosphere and because many useful compounds contain nitrogen. Biological nitrogen fixation probably occurs via the binding of N_{2} to those metal centers in the enzyme nitrogenase, followed by a series of steps that involve electron transfer and protonation.

== Bonding modes ==
In terms of its bonding to transition metals, N_{2} is related to CO and acetylene as all three species have triple bonds. A variety of bonding modes have been characterized. Based on whether the N_{2} molecules are shared by two more metal centers, the complexes can be classified into mononuclear and bridging. Based on the geometric relationship between the N_{2} molecule and the metal center, the complexes can be classified into end-on or side-on modes. In the end-on bonding modes of transition metal-dinitrogen complexes, the N-N vector can be considered in line with the metal ion center, whereas in the side-on modes, the metal-ligand bond is known to be perpendicular to the N-N vector.

=== Mononuclear, end-on ===
As a ligand, N_{2} usually binds to metals as an "end-on" ligand, as illustrated by [Ru(NH_{3})_{5}N_{2}]^{2+}. Such complexes are usually analogous to related CO derivatives. This relationship is illustrated by the pair of complexes IrCl(CO)(PPh_{3})_{2} and IrCl(N_{2})(PPh_{3})_{2}. In these mononuclear cases, N_{2} is both as a σ-donor and a π-acceptor. The M-N-N bond angles are close to 180°. N_{2} is a weaker pi-acceptor than CO, reflecting the nature of the π* orbitals on CO vs N_{2}. For this reason, few examples exist of complexes containing both CO and N_{2} ligand.

Transition metal-dinitrogen complexes can contain more than one N_{2} as "end-on" ligands, such as mer-[Mo(N_{2})_{3}(PPr^{n}_{2}Ph)_{3}], which has octahedral geometry. In another example, the dinitrogen ligand in Mo(N_{2})_{2}(Ph_{2}PCH_{2}CH_{2}PPh_{2})_{2} can be reduced to produce ammonia. Because many nitrogenases contain Mo, there has been particular interest in Mo-N_{2} complexes.

=== Bridging, end-on ===
N_{2} also serves as a bridging ligand with "end-on" bonding to two metal centers, as illustrated by {[Ru(NH_{3})_{5}]_{2}(μ-N_{2})}^{4+}. These complexes are also called multinuclear dinitrogen complexes. In contrast to their mononuclear counterpart, they can be prepared for both early and late transition metals.

In 2006, a study of iron-dinitrogen complexes by Holland and coworkers showed that the N–N bond is significantly weakened upon complexation with iron atoms with a low coordination number. The complex involved bidentate chelating ligands attached to the iron atoms in the Fe–N–N–Fe core, in which N_{2} acts as a bridging ligand between two iron atoms. Increasing the coordination number of iron by modifying the chelating ligands and adding another ligand per iron atom showed an increase in the strength of the N–N bond in the resulting complex. It is thus suspected that Fe in a low-coordination environment is a key factor to the fixation of nitrogen by the nitrogenase enzyme, since its Fe–Mo cofactor also features Fe with low coordination numbers.

The average bond length of those bridging-end-on dinitrogen complexes is about 1.2 Å. In some cases, the bond length can be as long as 1.4 Å, which is similar to those of N-N single bonds. Hasanayn and co-workers have shown that the Lewis structures of end-on bridging complexes can be assigned based on π-molecular-orbital occupancy, in analogy with simple tetratomic organic molecules. For example the cores of N_{2}-bridged complexes with 8, 10, or 12 π-electrons can generally be formulated, respectively, as M≡N-N≡M, M=N=N=M, and M-N≡N-M, in analogy with the 8-, 10-, and 12-π-electron organic molecules HC≡C-C≡CH, O=C=C=O, and F-C≡C-F.

=== Mononuclear, side-on ===
In comparison with their end-on counterpart, the mononuclear side-on dinitrogen complexes are usually higher in energy and the examples of them are rare. Dinitrogen act as a π-donor in these types of complexes. Fomitchev and Coppens has reported the first crystallographic evidence for side-on coordination of N_{2} to a single metal center in a photoinduced metastable state. When treated with UV light, the transition metal-dinitrogen complex, [Os(NH_{3})_{5}(N_{2})]^{2+} in solid states can be converted into a metastable state of [Os(NH_{3})_{5}(η^{2}-N_{2})]^{2+}, where the vibration of dinitrogen has shifted from 2025 to 1831 cm^{−1}.

Some other examples are considered to exist in the transition states of intramolecular linkage isomerizations. Armor and Taube has reported these isomerizations using ^{15}N-labelled dinitrogen as ligands.

=== Bridging, side-on ===
In a second mode of bridging, bimetallic complexes are known wherein the N-N vector is perpendicular to the M-M vector, which can be considered as side-on fashion. One example is [(η^{5}-C_{5}Me_{4}H)_{2}Zr]_{2}(μ_{2},η^{2},η^{2}-N_{2}). The dimetallic complex can react with H_{2} to achieve the artificial nitrogen fixation by reducing N_{2}. A related ditantalum tetrahydride complex could also reduce N_{2}.

== Reactivity ==
Hypothesized cycle for M-catalysed nitrogen fixation according to Chatt et al.

=== Cleavage to nitrides ===
When metal nitrido complexes are produced from N2, the intermediacy of a dinitrogen complex is assumed. Some Mo(III) complexes also cleave N_{2}:

2 Mo(NR_{2})_{3} + N_{2} → (R_{2}N)_{3}Mo-N_{2}-Mo(NR_{2})_{3}
(R_{2}N)_{3}Mo-N_{2}-Mo(NR_{2})_{3} → 2 N≡Mo(NR_{2})_{3}

=== Attack by electrophiles ===
Some electron-rich metal dinitrogen complexes are susceptible to attack by electrophiles on nitrogen. When the electrophile is a proton, the reaction is of interest in the context of abiological nitrogen fixation. Some metal-dintrogen complexes even catalyze the hydrogenation of N_{2} to ammonia in a cycle that involves N-protonation of a reduced M-N_{2} complex.

=== Photochemistry ===
Photolytic nitrogen splitting has been demonstrated.

== See also ==
- Abiological nitrogen fixation
- Main-group element-mediated activation of dinitrogen
- Transition metal nitrido complex
