= Abiological nitrogen fixation using homogeneous catalysts =

Chemical process that converts nitrogen to ammonia

Hypothesized cycle for M-catalysed nitrogen fixation according to Chatt et al.

Abiological nitrogen fixation describes chemical processes that convert (fix) the otherwise inert atmospheric dinitrogen (N_{2}) into usable nitrogen compounds such as ammonia (NH_{3}) without involving biotic nitrogenases (diazotrophy). While abiological nitrogen fixation can occur naturally via weather events such as lightning and cosmic radiation, the dominant form of abiological nitrogen fixation since the 20th century is the Haber process, which uses iron-based heterogeneous catalysts to artificially react nitrogen directly with hydrogen gas (H_{2}) to mass-produce ammonia, which can be used by the chemical industry to make fertilizers and explosives. This article focuses on homogeneous (soluble) catalysts for the same or similar conversions.

The conversion of N_{2} to NH_{3} abiologically has attracted much attention. Transition metal dinitrogen complexes are well known, some of which assist in scission or hydrogenation of dinitrogen. Some main-group element compounds also react with N_{2}.

== Evolution of catalysis ==
=== Vol'pin and Shur ===
An early influential discovery of abiological nitrogen fixation was made by Vol'pin and co-workers in Russia in the 1960s. Aspects are described in an early review:

"[we] were able to demonstrate the truly catalytic effect of titanium by treating dinitrogen with a mixture of titanium tetrachloride, metallic aluminium, and aluminium tribromide at 50 °C, either in the absence or in the presence of a solvent, e.g. benzene. As much as 200 mol of ammonia per mol of TiCl_{4} was obtained after hydrolysis...."

These results led to many studies on dinitrogen complexes of titanium and zirconium.

=== Mo- and Fe-based systems ===
structure of Nishibayashi's Mo_{2}(N_{2})_{3} complexes.

Because Mo and Fe are found at the active site of the most common and most active form of nitrogenase, these metals have been the focus of particular attention for homogeneous catalysis. Most catalytic systems operate according to the following stoichiometry:

N_{2} + 6 H^{+} + 6 e^{−} → 2 NH_{3}

The reductive protonation of metal dinitrogen complexes was popularized by Chatt and coworkers using Mo(N_{2})_{2}(dppe)_{2} as substrate. Treatment of this complex with acid gave substantial amounts of ammonium. Even though catalysis was not demonstrated, Chatt's work revealed the existence of several intermediates, including hydrazido complexes (Mo=N-NH_{2}).

Efforts also focussed on pincer ligand-supported Mo(0)-N_{2} complexes. These pincer complexes are similar to Chatt's complexes in that they too feature Mo(0). One Mo-PCP (PCP = phosphine-NHC-phosphine) complex catalyzes the hydrogenation of dinitrogen with >1000 turnovers. The reducing agent is samarium(II) iodide and the proton source is methanol.

Schrock developed a system unrelated to Chatt's Mo(0) precursors but based on the Mo(III) complex Mo[(HIPTN)_{3}N] where HIPTN is a bulky triamido ligand. This complex catalyzed conversion of dinitrogen to ammonium, albeit with only a few turnovers.

An early well-defined catalyst for nitrogen reduction.

Iron complexes of N_{2} are numerous. Derivatives of Fe(0) with C_{3}-symmetric ligands catalyze nitrogen fixation.

An Fe(0)-N_{2} catalyst.

== See also ==
- Nitrogenase: enzymes used by organisms to fix nitrogen
- Transition metal dinitrogen complex
- Metal nitrido complex
- Main-group element-mediated activation of dinitrogen
