= Potassium osmiamate =

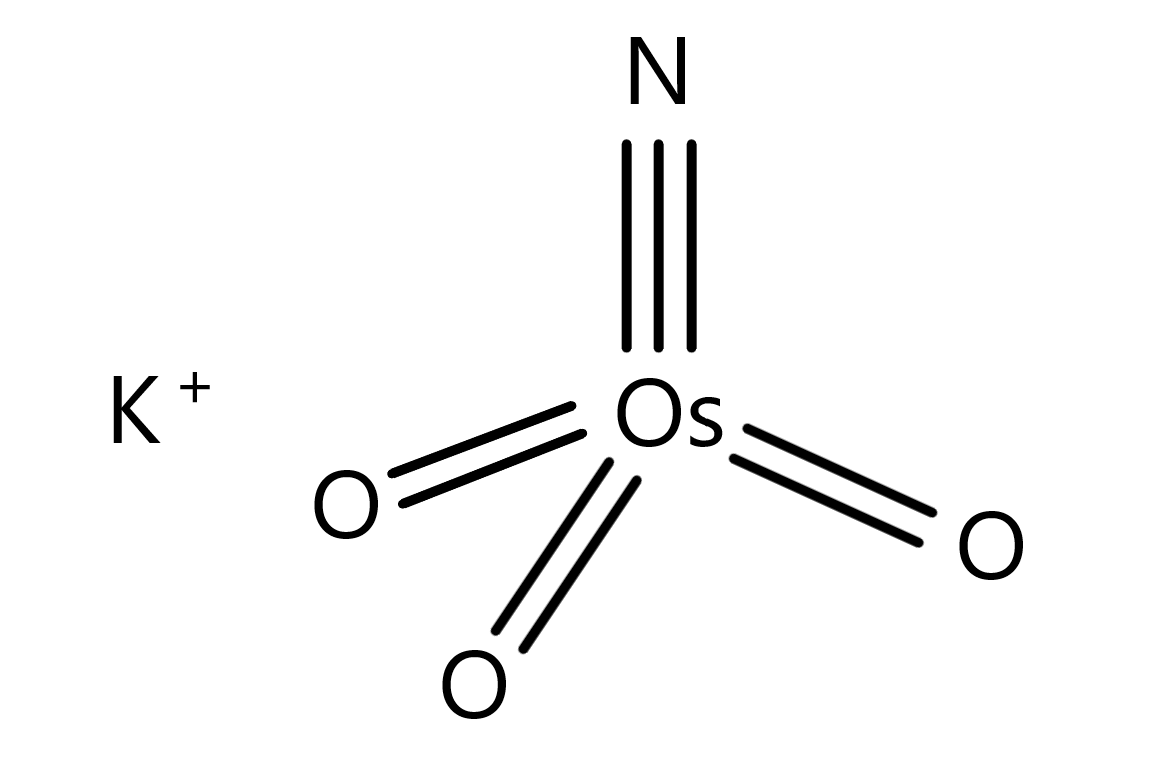

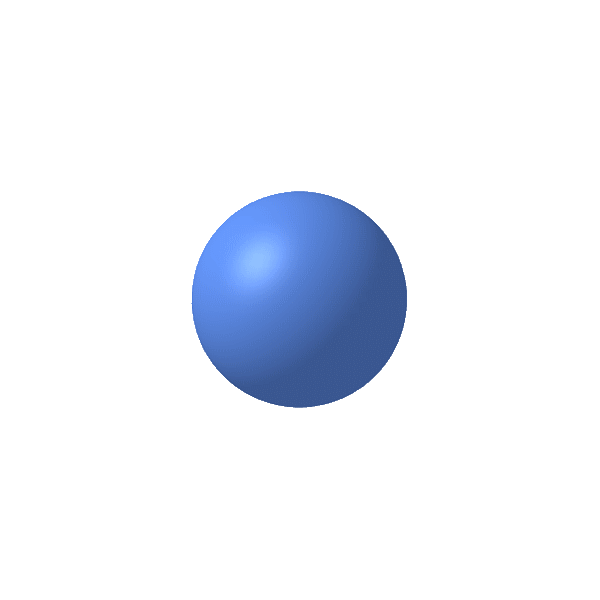

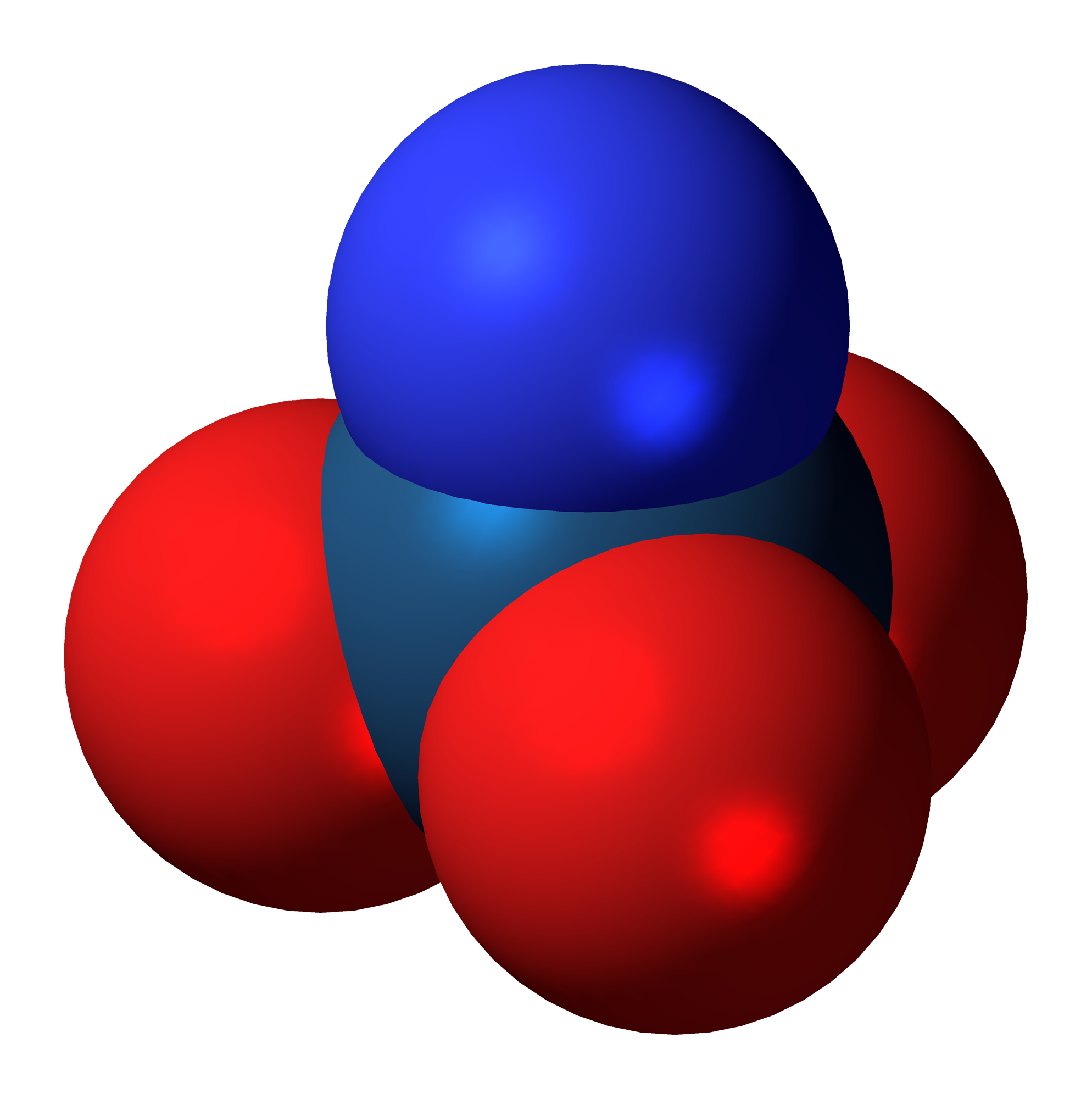

Names
- Other names Potassium nitridoosmate potassium nitridotrioxoosmate

Identifiers
CAS Number	21774-03-8
3D model (JSmol)	Interactive image
ChEBI	CHEBI:35657
ChemSpider	21865224
ECHA InfoCard	100.040.508
EC Number	244-575-8
Gmelin Reference	13067
PubChem CID	23715265
CompTox Dashboard (EPA)	DTXSID50944384
- InChI: InChI=1S/K.N.3O.Os/q+1;;;;-1; Key: GHMHNAKIJDYPIP-UHFFFAOYSA-N
- SMILES: N#[Os](=O)(=O)[O-].[K+]

Properties
Chemical formula	K[OsO_{3}N]
Molar mass	291.3 g/mol
Appearance	Yellow crystals
Density	4.2 g/cm^{3}
Melting point	187°C
Solubility in water	slightly soluble

Hazards
- GHS labelling
Pictograms	(GHS07: Exclamation mark)
Hazard statements	H315, H319, H335
Precautionary statements	P261, P305+P351+P338
- Except where otherwise noted, data are given for materials in their standard state (at 25 °C [77 °F], 100 kPa). Infobox references

Potassium osmiamate (also known as potassium nitridoosmate and potassium nitridotrioxoosmate) is an inorganic chemical compound with the formula K[OsO_{3}N], containing osmium in the +8 oxidation state.

== Properties ==
The osmiamate anion [OsO_{3}N]⁻ is structurally isoelectronic with osmium tetroxide, in which one oxygen atom is replaced with a nitrogen atom. It is classified as a transition metal nitrido complex, featuring a terminal nitrido ligand.

The potassium salt possesses a distorted tetrahedral structure, with infrared bands at 1023, 858, and 890 cm⁻¹. It forms yellow tetragonal bipyramidal crystals, which are slightly soluble in cold water, but more soluble in hot water. It is also soluble in alcohol, but not in ether. It is stable in strong alkali under heating, but when treated with hydrohalic acids such as HCl and HBr, it is reduced to pentahalonitridoosmates, such as K_{2}[OsNCl_{5}].

Potassium osmiamate is sensitive to light, and upon prolonged exposure samples darken. When heated to above 180 °C, it decomposes explosively, and when heated above 200 °C in a vacuum, it decomposes with the release of nitrogen gas.

== Synthesis ==
Potassium osmiamate is the most convenient of the osmiamate salts to prepare. It is made by adding aqueous ammonia to a solution containing osmium tetroxide and potassium hydroxide or potassium carbonate.

OsO_{4} + NH_{3} + KOH → K[OsO_{3}N] + 2H_{2}O

== Other osmiamates ==
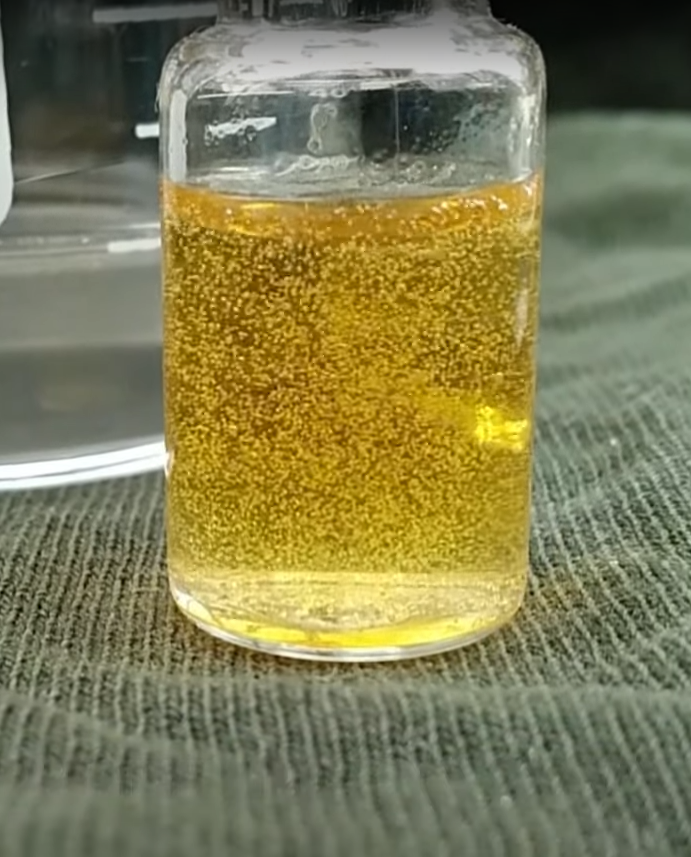
Solution of sodium osmiamate.

Numerous osmiamates are known, but they are usually prepared indirectly via metathesis reactions. Osmiamic acid, H[OsO_{3}N], is prepared by reacting barium osmiamate with sulfuric acid, or by reacting silver osmiamate with hydrochloric acid.

Sodium osmiamate is highly soluble in water and alcohol, and it can be prepared directly like the potassium salt. But the presence of ammonia causes the solution to become unstable and prone to decomposition. It is preferably prepared by the reaction of silver osmiamate with sodium chloride.
