= Potassium pentachloronitridoosmate =

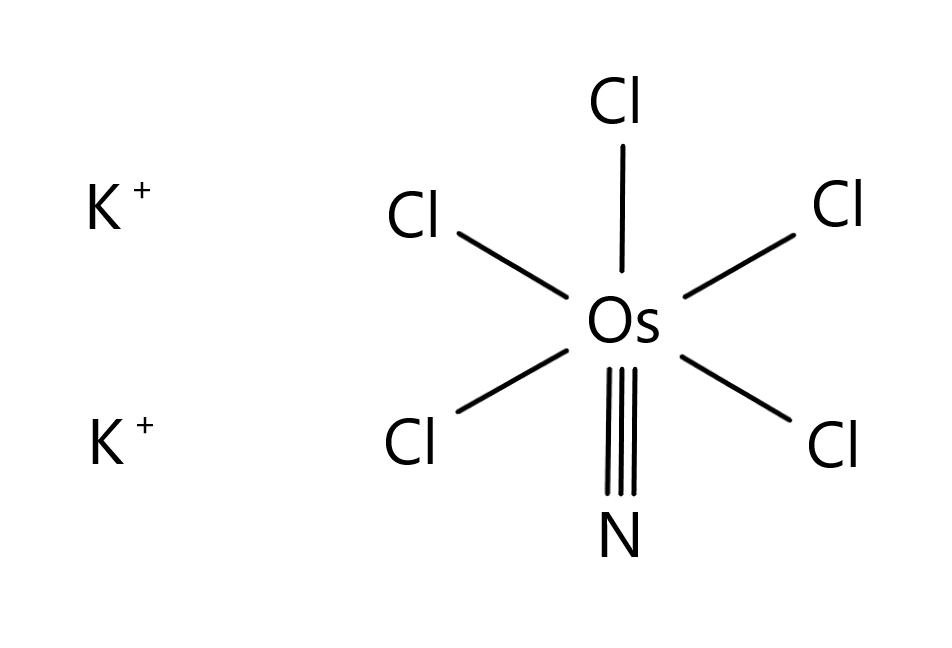

Identifiers
3D model (JSmol)	Interactive image
ChEBI	CHEBI:35659
ChemSpider	5256824
Gmelin Reference	36326
PubChem CID	6857488
- InChI: InChI=1S/5ClH.2K.N.Os/h5*1H;;;;/q;;;;;2*+1;;+3/p-5 Key: MXSUXDWBAVUTSN-UHFFFAOYSA-I
- SMILES: N#[Os-2](Cl)(Cl)(Cl)(Cl)Cl.[K+].[K+]

Properties
Chemical formula	K_{2}[OsCl_{5}N]
Molar mass	459.7 g/mol
Appearance	Reddish brown solid
Solubility in water	Soluble
- Except where otherwise noted, data are given for materials in their standard state (at 25 °C [77 °F], 100 kPa). Infobox references

Potassium pentachloronitridoosmate is an inorganic chemical compound with the formula K_{2}[OsCl_{5}N]. It is a true nitride, as the nitrogen atom is bonded directly to the osmium atom, which is itself in the +6 oxidation state.

== Properties ==
Potassium pentachloronitridoosmate is a red powder that is easily soluble in water, the solutions of which slowly decompose. It is soluble in HCl, but insoluble in organic solvents, and it decomposes in alkali. It forms prismatic crystals.

== Synthesis ==
The compound is made by reacting potassium osmiamate with cold hydrochloric acid in the presence of potassium chloride.

KOsO_{3}N + KCl + 6HCl → K_{2}OsCl_{5}N + Cl_{2} + 3H_{2}O

== Reactions ==
Ozone can oxidize this compound back to potassium osmiamate. HCl and stannous chloride reduce it to K_{2}Os(NH_{2})Cl_{5}, which is regarded as an amide of potassium hexachloroosmate.
