= Vanadium nitrogenase =

Enzyme necessary for the process of nitrogen fixation

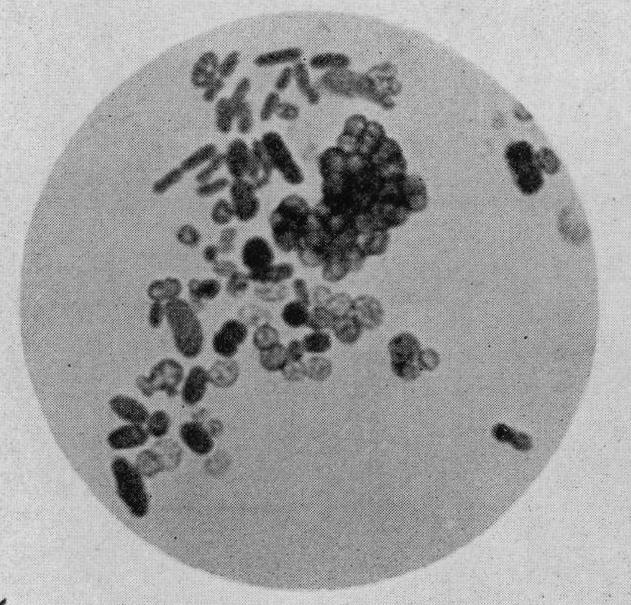
Azotobacter sp. cells, stained with Heidenhain's iron hematoxylin, ×1000. Vanadium Nitrogenases are found in members of the bacteria genus Azotobacter as well as the species R. palustris and A. variabilis

Vanadium nitrogenase is a key enzyme for nitrogen fixation found in nitrogen-fixing bacteria, and is used as an alternative to molybdenum nitrogenase when molybdenum is unavailable. Vanadium nitrogenases are an important biological use of vanadium, which is uncommonly used by life. An important component of the nitrogen cycle, vanadium nitrogenase converts nitrogen gas to ammonia, thereby making otherwise inaccessible nitrogen available to plants. Unlike molybdenum nitrogenase, vanadium nitrogenase can also reduce carbon monoxide to ethylene, ethane and propane but both enzymes can reduce protons to hydrogen gas and acetylene to ethylene.

== Biological functions ==
Vanadium nitrogenases are found in members of the bacterial genus Azotobacter as well as the species Rhodopseudomonas palustris and Anabaena variabilis. Most of the functions of vanadium nitrogenase match those of the more common molybdenum nitrogenases and serve as an alternative pathway for nitrogen fixation in molybdenum deficient conditions. Like molybdenum nitrogenase, dihydrogen functions as a competitive inhibitor and carbon monoxide functions as a non-competitive inhibitor of nitrogen fixation. Vanadium nitrogenase has an α_{2}β_{2}Ύ_{2} subunit structure while molybdenum nitrogenase has an α_{2}β_{2} structure. Though the structural genes encoding vanadium nitrogenase show only about 15% conservation with molybdenum nitrogenases, the two nitrogenases share the same type of iron-sulphur redox centers. At room temperature, vanadium nitrogenase is less efficient at fixing nitrogen than molybdenum nitrogenases because it converts more H^{+} to H_{2} as a side reaction. However, at low temperatures vanadium nitrogenases have been found to be more active than the molybdenum type, and at temperatures as low as 5 °C its nitrogen-fixing activity is 10 times higher than that of molybdenum nitrogenase. Like molybdenum nitrogenase, vanadium nitrogenase is easily oxidized and is thus only active under anaerobic conditions. Various bacteria employ complex protection mechanisms to avoid oxygen.

The overall stoichiometry of nitrogen fixation catalyzed by vanadium nitrogenase can be summarized as follows:

N_{2} + 12e^{−} + 14H^{+} + 24MgATP → 2NH_{4}^{+} + 3H_{2} + 24MgADP + 24HPO_{4}^{2−}

The crystal structure of A. vinelandii vanadium nitrogenase was resolved in 2017 (PDB: 5N6Y). Compared to Mo nitrogenase, V nitrogenase replaces one sulfide in the active site with a bridging ligand.

== Carbon monoxide reduction ==
Research at the University of California Irvine showed the ability of vanadium nitrogenase to convert carbon monoxide into trace amounts of propane, ethylene, and ethane in the absence of nitrogen through the reduction of carbon monoxide by dithionite and ATP hydrolysis . The process of forming these hydrocarbons is carried out through proton and electron transfer in which short carbon chains are formed and may ultimately allow the production of hydrocarbon fuel from CO at an industrial scale.
