= Nif gene =

Genes encoding enzymes involved in the fixation of atmospheric nitrogen

The nif genes are genes encoding enzymes involved in the fixation of atmospheric nitrogen into a form of nitrogen available to living organisms. The primary enzyme encoded by the nif genes is the nitrogenase complex which is in charge of converting atmospheric nitrogen (N_{2}) to other nitrogen forms such as ammonia which the organism can use for various purposes. Besides the nitrogenase enzyme, the nif genes also encode a number of regulatory proteins involved in nitrogen fixation. The nif genes are found in both free-living nitrogen-fixing bacteria and in symbiotic bacteria associated with various plants. The expression of the nif genes is induced as a response to low concentrations of fixed nitrogen and oxygen concentrations (the low oxygen concentrations are actively maintained in the root environment of host plants). The first Rhizobium genes for nitrogen fixation (nif) and for nodulation (nod) were cloned in the early 1980s by Gary Ruvkun and Sharon R. Long in Frederick M. Ausubel's laboratory.

== Regulation ==
In most bacteria, regulation of nif genes transcription is done by the nitrogen sensitive NifA protein. When there isn't enough fixed nitrogen available for the organism's use, NtrC triggers NifA expression, and NifA activates the rest of the nif genes. If there is a sufficient amount of reduced nitrogen or oxygen is present, another protein is activated: NifL. NifL inhibits NifA activity resulting in the inhibition of nitrogenase formation. NifL is regulated by the products of glnD and glnK. The nif genes can be found on bacterial chromosomes, but in symbiotic bacteria they are often found on plasmids or symbiosis islands with other genes related to nitrogen fixation (such as the nod genes).

== Examples in nature ==
The expression and regulation of nif genes, while sharing common features in all or most of the nitrogen-fixing organisms in nature, have distinct characters and qualities that differ from one diazotroph to another. Examples of nif gene structure and regulation in different diazotrophs include:

Klebsiella pneumoniae—a free-living, facultatively anaerobic nitrogen-fixing bacterium. It contains a total of 20 nif genes located on the chromosome in a 24-Kb region. nifH, nifD, and nifK encode the nitrogenase subunits, while nifE, nifN, nifU, nifS, nifV, nifW, nifX, nifB, and nifQ encode proteins involved the assembly and incorporation of iron and molybdenum atoms into the nitrogenase subunits. nifF and nifJ encode proteins related to electron transfer taking place in the reduction process and nifA and nifL are regulatory proteins in charge of regulating the expression of the other nif genes.

Rhodospirillum rubrum—a free-living anaerobic photosynthetic bacterium which, in addition to the transcriptional controls described above, regulates expression of the nif genes also in a metabolic way through a reversible ADP-ribosylation of a specific arginine residue in the nitrogenase complex. The ribosylation takes place when reduced nitrogen is present and it causes a barrier in the electron transfer flow and thereby inactivates nitrogenase activity. The enzymes catalyzing the ribosylation are called DraG and DraT.

Rhodobacter capsulatus—a free-living anaerobic phototroph containing a transcriptional nif gene regulatory system. R. capsulatus regulates nif gene expression through nifA in the same manner described before, but it uses a different nifA activator which initiates the NtrC. NtrC activates a different expression of nifA and the other nif genes.

Rhizobium spp.—Gram-negative, symbiotic nitrogen fixing bacteria that usually form a symbiotic relationship with legume species. In some rhizobia, the nif genes are located on plasmids called 'sym plasmids' (sym = symbiosis) which contain genes related to nitrogen fixation and metabolism, while the chromosomes contain most of the housekeeping genes of the bacteria. Regulation of the nif genes is at the transcriptional level and is dependent on colonization of the plant host.

== See also ==
- Nif regulon (Klebsiella pneumoniae)
