= Nif regulon =

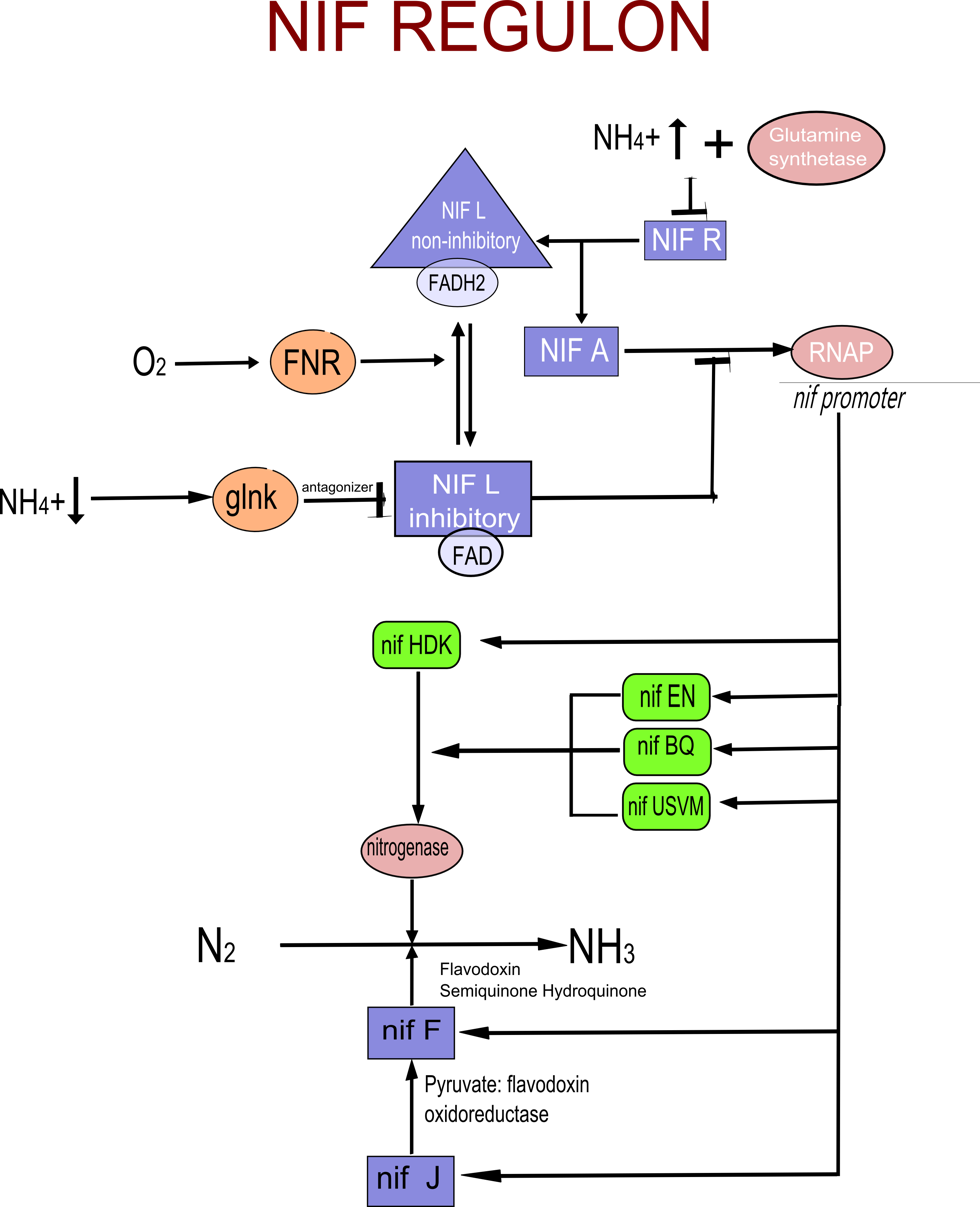

The Nif regulon is a set of seven operons used to regulate nitrogen fixation in the coliform bacterium Klebsiella pneumoniae under anaerobic and microaerophilic conditions. It includes 17 nif genes, and is situated between the his and the Shi-A operon of the bacterium.

== The Nif Regulon ==
The nif regulon comprises 7 operons: nifRLA, nifJ, nifHDK, nifEN, nifUSVM, nifWF, nifBQ.

nifRLA operon: The tight expression regulation of the nitrogen fixation (nif) genes is mediated by the products of the nifRLA operon. NifA activates transcription of nif genes by the alternative form of RNA polymerase, s54-holoenzyme. NifL is a negative regulatory gene which inhibits the activation of other nif genes by nifA protein. NifR is a repressor binding site, between the promoter of the nifRLA operon and the nifL gene. No protein coded by nifR gene has been found.

nifHDK operon: comprises three structural genes: nifK nifD and nifH. nifK encodes for B-subunit of Component 1 of nitrogenase. nifD encodes for alpha subunit of component 1 of nitrogenase. nifH encodes for component 2 of nitrogenase.

nifEN and nifBQ operons: This comprises nifE, nifN, nifB and nifQ genes which are responsible for formation of a functional Mo-Fe protein. (Mo-Fe-co catalytic site for nitrogenase.) nifQ is not absolutely essential.

nifJ operon:The nifJ gene encodes for the pyruvate-flavodoxin-oxidoreductase protein. This enzyme is involved in electron transfer to nitrogenase.

nifUSVM operon: The nifS, nifV and nifM genes encode for a protein that is required to process component II. Function of the nifU gene is undetermined.

nifWF operon: The function of nifW is undetermined. The nifF gene mediates electron transfer from nifJ protein to Fe protein of nitrogenase.

== Regulation ==
The Nif regulon is regulated in response to a variety of environmental signals to ensure nitrogen-fixation only occurs when necessary:

=== Oxygen ===
The action site of O2 is the nifL protein which is basically a flavoprotein with FAD as the redox sensing cofactor. Fnr (fumarate nitrate reduction regulator) is the signal transduction molecule which transduces the oxygen status to the nifL protein. In the absence of oxygen, the nifL protein is in its reduced form (FADH2 as the cofactor ) and is unable to inhibit the action of nifA protein. In oxygen's presence, oxidized nifL (FAD as the cofactor) inhibits nifA protein and there by turns off all the other operons.

=== NH4+ ===
The presence of ammonium ions in large amounts in the environment inhibits the transcription of nitrogenase and all the other nif genes. NH4+ acts as a co-repressor to the glutamine synthetase by modifying it covalently (adenylylation). This modified enzyme binds to the nifR region of the nifRLA operon and prevents the transcription of the genes, nifL and nifA. So, there is no initiation of transcription of the other genes by the σ-RNA polymerase.

=== Glnk protein ===
In the nitrogen limiting growth conditions, the inhibition of nifA protein by the nifL protein is prevented by the antagonizing action of Glnk protein on the nifL proteins.

A homologue of the NifL-NifA regulatory gene system has not been found among the eukaryotes. However Entamoeba histolytica was found to possess a simplified and non-redundant NIF (nitrogen fixation)-like system for the Fe-S cluster formation, composed of only a catalytic component, NifS, and a scaffold component, NifU. EhNifS and EhNifU were found to be necessary and sufficient for Fe-S clusters of non-nitrogenase Fe-S proteins to form under anaerobic conditions. This is the first demonstration of the presence and biological significance of the NIF-like system in eukaryotes.
