= Nitrogenase =

Class of enzymes

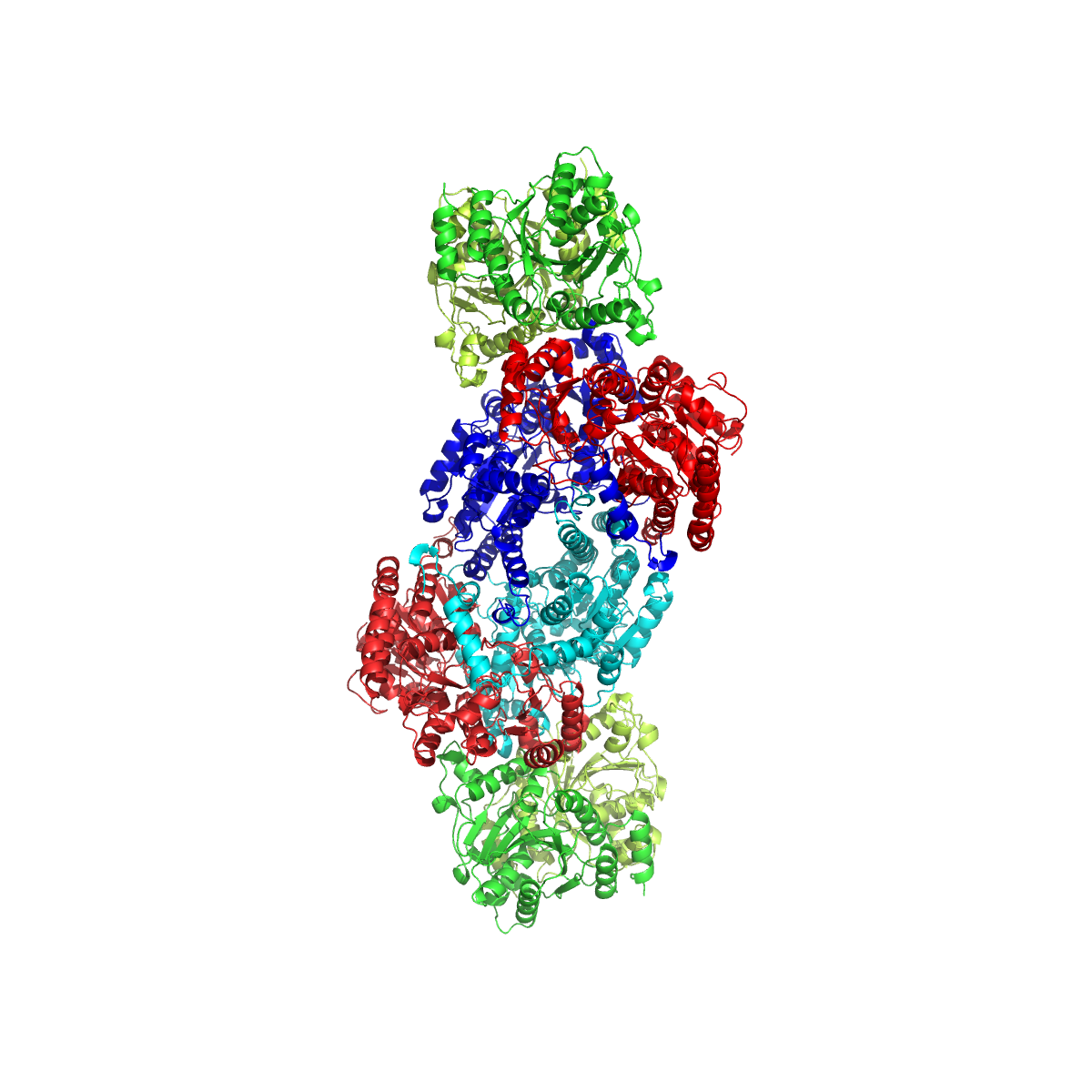

Identifiers
- EC no.: 1.18.6.1
- CAS no.: 9013-04-1

Databases
- BRENDA: enzyme data
- ExPASy: NiceZyme view
- KEGG: enzyme entry
- MetaCyc: metabolic pathway
- Rhea: reactions
- PDB structures: RCSB PDB PDBe PDBsum
Search
- PMC: articles
- PubMed: articles
- NCBI: proteins

Nitrogenase-type Oxidoreductase (component 1 subunit alpha/beta)

Identifiers
- Symbol: Oxidored_nitro
- Pfam: PF00148
- InterPro: IPR000510
- SCOP2: 1mio / SCOPe / SUPFAM
Available protein structures:
- PDB: IPR000510 PF00148 (ECOD; PDBsum)
- AlphaFold: IPR000510; PF00148

Nitrogenase iron protein NifH (component 2)

Identifiers
- Symbol: NifH
- InterPro: IPR005977
- CATH: 1fp6
- SCOP2: d1fp6a_ / SCOPe / SUPFAM
- CDD: cd02040
Available protein structures:
- PDB: IPR005977
- AlphaFold: IPR005977

Alternative nitrogenase (component 1) delta subunit

Identifiers
- Symbol: AnfG_VnfG
- Pfam: PF03139
- InterPro: IPR004349
Available protein structures:
- PDB: IPR004349 PF03139 (ECOD; PDBsum)
- AlphaFold: IPR004349; PF03139

Nitrogenases are enzymes (EC 1.18.6.1EC 1.19.6.1) that are produced by certain bacteria, such as cyanobacteria (blue-green bacteria) and rhizobacteria. These enzymes are responsible for the reduction of nitrogen (N_{2}) to ammonia (NH_{3}). Nitrogenases are the only family of enzymes known to catalyze this reaction, which is a step in the process of nitrogen fixation. Nitrogen fixation is required for all forms of life, with nitrogen being essential for the biosynthesis of molecules (nucleotides, amino acids) that create plants, animals and other organisms. They are encoded by the Nif genes or homologs. They are related to protochlorophyllide reductase.

== Classification and structure ==
Although the equilibrium formation of ammonia from molecular hydrogen and nitrogen has an overall negative enthalpy of reaction ($\Delta H^{0} = -45.2 \ \mathrm{kJ} \, \mathrm{mol^{-1}} \; \mathrm{NH_3}$), the activation energy is very high ($E_\mathrm{A} = 230-420 \ \mathrm{kJ} \, \mathrm{mol^{-1}}$). Nitrogenase acts as a catalyst, reducing this energy barrier such that the reaction can take place at ambient temperatures.

A usual assembly consists of two components:

1. The homodimeric Fe-only protein, the reductase which has a high reducing power and is responsible for a supply of electrons.
2. The heterotetrameric MoFe protein, a nitrogenase which uses the electrons provided to reduce N_{2} to NH_{3}. In some assemblies it is replaced by a homologous alternative.

Structure of the FeMo cofactor showing the sites of binding to nitrogenase (the amino acids cys and his).

=== Reductase ===
The Fe protein, the dinitrogenase reductase or NifH, is a dimer of identical subunits which contains one [Fe_{4}S_{4}] cluster and has a mass of approximately 60-64kDa. The function of the Fe protein is to transfer electrons from a reducing agent, such as ferredoxin or flavodoxin to the nitrogenase protein. Ferredoxin or flavodoxin can be reduced by one of six mechanisms: 1. by a pyruvate:ferredoxin oxidoreductase, 2. by a bi-directional hydrogenase, 3. in a photosynthetic reaction center, 4. by coupling electron flow to dissipation of the proton motive force, 5. by electron bifurcation, or 6. by a ferredoxin:NADPH oxidoreductase. The transfer of electrons requires an input of chemical energy which comes from the binding and hydrolysis of ATP. The hydrolysis of ATP also causes a conformational change within the nitrogenase complex, bringing the Fe protein and MoFe protein closer together for easier electron transfer.

=== Nitrogenase ===
The MoFe protein is a heterotetramer consisting of two α subunits and two β subunits, with a mass of approximately 240-250kDa. The MoFe protein also contains two iron–sulfur clusters, known as P-clusters, located at the interface between the α and β subunits and two FeMo cofactors, within the α subunits. The oxidation state of Mo in these nitrogenases was formerly thought Mo(V), but more recent evidence is for Mo(III). (Molybdenum in other enzymes is generally bound to molybdopterin as fully oxidized Mo(VI)).

- The core (Fe_{8}S_{7}) of the P-cluster takes the form of two [Fe_{4}S_{3}] cubes linked by a central sulfur atom. Each P-cluster is linked to the MoFe protein by six cysteine residues.
- Each FeMo cofactor (Fe_{7}MoS_{9}C) consists of two non-identical clusters: [Fe_{4}S_{3}] and [MoFe_{3}S_{3}], which are linked by three sulfide ions. Each FeMo cofactor is covalently linked to the α subunit of the protein by one cysteine residue and one histidine residue.

Electrons from the Fe protein enter the MoFe protein at the P-clusters, which then transfer the electrons to the FeMo cofactors. Each FeMo cofactor then acts as a site for nitrogen fixation, with N_{2} binding in the central cavity of the cofactor.

==== Variations ====
The MoFe protein can be replaced by alternative nitrogenases in environments low in the Mo cofactor. Two types of such nitrogenases are known: the vanadium–iron (VFe; Vnf) type and the iron–iron (FeFe; Anf) type. Both form an assembly of two α subunits, two β subunits, and two δ (sometimes γ: VnfG/AnfG) subunits. The delta subunits are homologous to each other, and the alpha and beta subunits themselves are homologous to the ones found in MoFe nitrogenase. The gene clusters are also homologous, and these subunits are interchangeable to some degree. All nitrogenases use a similar Fe-S core cluster, and the variations come in the cofactor metal. The δ/γ subunit helps bind the cofactor in the FeFe nitrogenase. Based on the timing of its evolution, the subunit in VFe and FeFe nitrogenases is believed to have helped with the prototypical alternative nitrogenase adapt to new metals.

Most, if not all, natural organisms carrying genes for an alternative nitrogenase also carry genes for the regular MoFe nitrogenase. The MoFe nitrogenase is the most efficient in that it wastes less ATP on reducing H^{+} into H_{2} than the alternative nitrogenases (see #General mechanism below). When Mo is present, the expression of the alternative nitrogenases is repressed, so that only the more efficient enzyme is used.

The FeFe nitrogenase in Azotobacter vinelandii (a model organism for nitrogenase engineering) is organized in an anfHDGKOR operon. This operon still requires some of the Nif genes to function. A minimal 10-gene operon that incorporates these additional essential genes has been constructed in the lab.

== Mechanism ==
Nitrogenase with catalytic sites highlighted. There are two sets of catalytic sites within each nitrogenase enzyme.

Nitrogenase with one set of metal clusters magnified. Electrons travel from the Fe-S cluster (yellow) to the P cluster (red), and end at the FeMo-co (orange).

=== General mechanism ===
Catalytic sites within nitrogenase. Atoms are colored by element. Top: Fe-S Cluster Middle: P Cluster Bottom: FeMo-co/M-cluster

Nitrogenase is an enzyme responsible for catalyzing nitrogen fixation, which is the reduction of nitrogen (N_{2}) to ammonia (NH_{3}) and a process vital to sustaining life on Earth. There are three types of nitrogenase found in various nitrogen-fixing bacteria: molybdenum (Mo) nitrogenase, vanadium (V) nitrogenase, and iron-only (Fe) nitrogenase. Molybdenum nitrogenase, which can be found in diazotrophs such as legume-associated rhizobia, is the nitrogenase that has been studied the most extensively and thus is the most well characterized. Vanadium nitrogenase and iron-only nitrogenase can both be found in select species of Azotobacter as an alternative nitrogenase. Equations 1 and 2 show the balanced reactions of nitrogen fixation in molybdenum nitrogenase and vanadium nitrogenase respectively.

N_{2} + 8 H^{+} + 8 e^{−} + 16 MgATP → 2 NH_{3} + H_{2} + 16 MgADP + 16 P_{i}	1

N_{2} + 18 H^{+} + 18 e^{−} + 36 MgATP → 2 NH_{3} + 6 H_{2} + 36 MgADP + 36 P_{i}	2

N_{2} + 20 H^{+} + 20 e^{−} + 40 MgATP → 2 NH_{3} + 7 H_{2} + 40 MgADP + 40 P_{i}	3

Recent refinements to the kinetic framework of Mo-nitrogenase (1) suggest that the minimum energetic cost of N_{2} reduction is higher than previously assumed, corresponding to approximately 25 MgATP per N_{2}. This revision is based on the observation that electron transfer from the Fe protein to the FeMo cofactor is not always productive, as MgATP dependent conformational gating introduces a significant number of unproductive electron transfer cycles. This diminishes the overall efficiency of coupling between ATP hydrolysis and substrate reduction, consequently increasing the total ATP requirement for catalysis.

All nitrogenases are two-component systems made up of Component I (also known as dinitrogenase) and Component II (also known as dinitrogenase reductase). Component I is a MoFe protein in molybdenum nitrogenase, a VFe protein in vanadium nitrogenase, and an Fe protein in iron-only nitrogenase. Component II is a Fe protein that contains the Fe-S cluster., which transfers electrons to Component I. Component I contains 2 metal clusters: the P-cluster, and the FeMo-cofactor (FeMo-co, M-cluster). Mo is replaced by V or Fe in vanadium nitrogenase and iron-only nitrogenase respectively. During catalysis, 2 equivalents of MgATP are hydrolysed which helps to decrease the potential of the to the Fe-S cluster and drive reduction of the P-cluster, and finally to the FeMo-co, where reduction of N_{2} to NH_{3} takes place.

=== Lowe-Thorneley kinetic model ===
The reduction of nitrogen to two molecules of ammonia is carried out at the FeMo-co of Component I after the sequential addition of proton and electron equivalents from Component II. Steady state, freeze quench, and stopped-flow kinetics measurements carried out in the 1970s and 1980s by Lowe, Thorneley, and others provided a kinetic basis for this process. The Lowe-Thorneley (LT) kinetic model was developed from these experiments and documents the eight correlated proton and electron transfers required throughout the reaction. Each intermediate stage is depicted as E_{n} where n = 0–8, corresponding to the number of equivalents transferred. The transfer of four equivalents are required before the productive addition of N_{2}, although reaction of E_{3} with N_{2} is also possible. Notably, nitrogen reduction has been shown to require 8 equivalents of protons and electrons as opposed to the 6 equivalents predicted by the balanced chemical reaction.

=== Intermediates E_{0} through E_{4} ===
Spectroscopic characterization of these intermediates has allowed for greater understanding of nitrogen reduction by nitrogenase, however, the mechanism remains an active area of research and debate. Briefly listed below are spectroscopic experiments for the intermediates before the addition of nitrogen:

E_{0} – This is the resting state of the enzyme before catalysis begins. Electron paramagnetic resonance (EPR) characterization shows that this species has a spin of ^{3}/_{2}.

E_{1} – The one electron reduced intermediate has been trapped during turnover under N_{2}. Mӧssbauer spectroscopy of the trapped intermediate indicates that the FeMo-co is integer spin greater than 1.

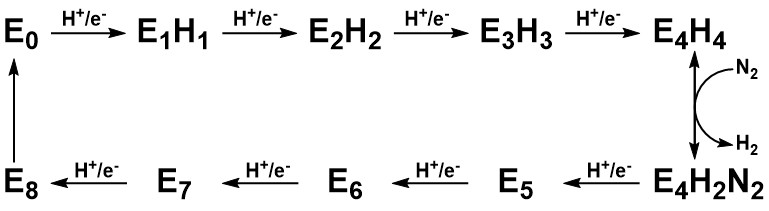
Lowe-Thorneley kinetic model for reduction of nitrogen to ammonia by nitrogenase.

E_{2} – This intermediate is proposed to contain the metal cluster in its resting oxidation state with the two added electrons stored in a bridging hydride and the additional proton bonded to a sulfur atom. Isolation of this intermediate in mutated enzymes shows that the FeMo-co is high spin and has a spin of ^{3}/_{2}.

E_{3} – This intermediate is proposed to be the singly reduced FeMo-co with one bridging hydride and one hydride.

E_{4} – Termed the Janus intermediate after the Roman god of transitions, this intermediate is positioned after exactly half of the electron proton transfers and can either decay back to E_{0} or proceed with nitrogen binding and finish the catalytic cycle. This intermediate is proposed to contain the FeMo-co in its resting oxidation state with two bridging hydrides and two sulfur bonded protons. This intermediate was first observed using freeze quench techniques with a mutated protein in which residue 70, a valine amino acid, is replaced with isoleucine. This modification prevents substrate access to the FeMo-co. EPR characterization of this isolated intermediate shows a new species with a spin of ½. Electron nuclear double resonance (ENDOR) experiments have provided insight into the structure of this intermediate, revealing the presence of two bridging hydrides. ^{95}Mo and ^{57}Fe ENDOR show that the hydrides bridge between two iron centers. Cryoannealing of the trapped intermediate at -20 °C results in the successive loss of two hydrogen equivalents upon relaxation, proving that the isolated intermediate is consistent with the E_{4} state. The decay of E_{4} to E_{2} + H_{2} and finally to E_{0} and 2H_{2} has confirmed the EPR signal associated with the E_{2} intermediate.

The above intermediates suggest that the metal cluster is cycled between its original oxidation state and a singly reduced state with additional electrons being stored in hydrides. It has alternatively been proposed that each step involves the formation of a hydride and that the metal cluster actually cycles between the original oxidation state and a singly oxidized state.

=== Distal and alternating pathways for N_{2} fixation ===
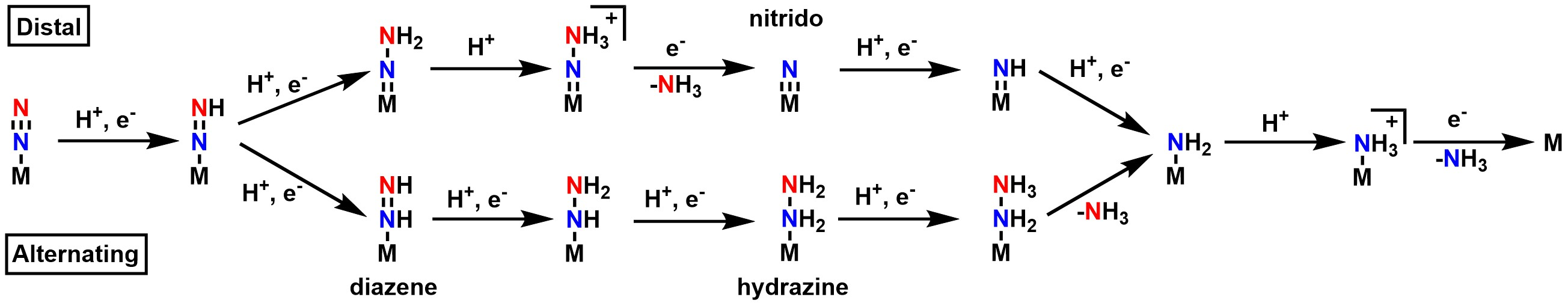
Distal vs. alternating mechanistic pathways for nitrogen fixation in nitrogenase.

While the mechanism for nitrogen fixation prior to the Janus E_{4} complex is generally agreed upon, there are currently two hypotheses for the exact pathway in the second half of the mechanism: the "distal" and the "alternating" pathway. In the distal pathway, the terminal nitrogen is hydrogenated first, releases ammonia, then the nitrogen directly bound to the metal is hydrogenated. In the alternating pathway, one hydrogen is added to the terminal nitrogen, then one hydrogen is added to the nitrogen directly bound to the metal. This alternating pattern continues until ammonia is released. Because each pathway favors a unique set of intermediates, attempts to determine which path is correct have generally focused on the isolation of said intermediates, such as the nitrido in the distal pathway, and the diazene and hydrazine in the alternating pathway. Attempts to isolate the intermediates in nitrogenase itself have so far been unsuccessful, but the use of model complexes has allowed for the isolation of intermediates that support both sides depending on the metal center used. Studies with Mo generally point towards a distal pathway, while studies with Fe generally point towards an alternating pathway.

Specific support for the distal pathway has mainly stemmed from the work of Schrock and Chatt, who successfully isolated the nitrido complex using Mo as the metal center in a model complex. Specific support for the alternating pathway stems from a few studies. Iron only model clusters have been shown to catalytically reduce N_{2}. Small tungsten clusters have also been shown to follow an alternating pathway for nitrogen fixation. The vanadium nitrogenase releases hydrazine, an intermediate specific to the alternating mechanism. However, the lack of characterized intermediates in the native enzyme itself means that neither pathway has been definitively proven. Furthermore, computational studies have been found to support both sides, depending on whether the reaction site is assumed to be at Mo (distal) or at Fe (alternating) in the MoFe cofactor.

=== Mechanism of MgATP binding ===
Binding of MgATP is one of the central events to occur in the mechanism employed by nitrogenase. Hydrolysis of the terminal phosphate group of MgATP provides the energy needed to transfer electrons from the Fe protein to the MoFe protein. The binding interactions between the MgATP phosphate groups and the amino acid residues of the Fe protein are well understood by comparing to similar enzymes, while the interactions with the rest of the molecule are more elusive due to the lack of a Fe protein crystal structure with MgATP bound (as of 1996). Three protein residues have been shown to have significant interactions with the phosphates. In the absence of MgATP, a salt bridge exists between residue 15, lysine, and residue 125, aspartic acid. Upon binding, this salt bridge is interrupted. Site-specific mutagenesis has demonstrated that when the lysine is substituted for a glutamine, the protein's affinity for MgATP is greatly reduced and when the lysine is substituted for an arginine, MgATP cannot bind due to the salt bridge being too strong. The necessity of specifically aspartic acid at site 125 has been shown through noting altered reactivity upon mutation of this residue to glutamic acid. Residue 16, serine, has been shown to bind MgATP. Site-specific mutagenesis was used to demonstrate this fact. This has led to a model in which the serine remains coordinated to the Mg^{2+} ion after phosphate hydrolysis in order to facilitate its association with a different phosphate of the now ADP molecule. MgATP binding also induces significant conformational changes within the Fe protein. Site-directed mutagenesis was employed to create mutants in which MgATP binds but does not induce a conformational change. Comparing X-ray scattering data in the mutants versus in the wild-type protein led to the conclusion that the entire protein contracts upon MgATP binding, with a decrease in radius of approximately 2.0 Å.

=== Other mechanistic details ===
Many mechanistic aspects of catalysis remain unknown. No crystallographic analysis has been reported on substrate bound to nitrogenase.

Nitrogenase is able to reduce acetylene, but is inhibited by carbon monoxide, which binds to the enzyme and thereby prevents binding of dinitrogen. Dinitrogen prevent acetylene binding, but acetylene does not inhibit binding of dinitrogen and requires only one electron for reduction to ethylene. Due to the oxidative properties of oxygen, most nitrogenases are irreversibly inhibited by dioxygen, which degradatively oxidizes the Fe-S cofactors. This requires mechanisms for nitrogen fixers to protect nitrogenase from oxygen in vivo. Despite this problem, many use oxygen as a terminal electron acceptor for respiration. Although the ability of some nitrogen fixers such as Azotobacteraceae to employ an oxygen-labile nitrogenase under aerobic conditions has been attributed to a high metabolic rate, allowing oxygen reduction at the cell membrane, the effectiveness of such a mechanism has been questioned at oxygen concentrations above 70 μM (ambient concentration is 230 μM O_{2}), as well as during additional nutrient limitations. MoFe-nitrogenase in Azotobacter vinelandii is protected from oxidative damage by a small ferredoxin-like protein called Shethna protein II (FeSII). Under oxidative stress, the [Fe_{2}-S_{2}] cluster in FeSII becomes oxidized, triggering the formation of a filamentous complex involving FeSII and the Fe and MoFe subunits of nitrogenase. This complex locks the nitrogenase in an inactive, yet conformationally protected, state. This reversible “switch-off” mechanism, driven by a redox-sensitive conformational change in FeSII, is a key strategy the organism uses to shield nitrogenase from oxygen damage. A molecule found in the nitrogen-fixing nodules of leguminous plants, leghemoglobin, which can bind to dioxygen via a heme prosthetic group, plays a crucial role in buffering O_{2} at the active site of the nitrogenase, while concomitantly allowing for efficient respiration.

== Nonspecific reactions ==
In addition to dinitrogen reduction, nitrogenases also reduce protons to dihydrogen, meaning nitrogenase is also a dehydrogenase. A list of other reactions carried out by nitrogenases is shown below:

HC≡CH → H_{2}C=CH_{2}
N^{–}=N^{+}=O → N_{2} + H_{2}O
N=N=N^{–} → N_{2} + NH_{3}
C≡N^{−} → CH_{4}, NH_{3}, H_{3}C–CH_{3}, H_{2}C=CH_{2} (CH_{3}NH_{2})
N≡C–R → RCH_{3} + NH_{3}
C≡N–R → CH_{4}, H_{3}C–CH_{3}, H_{2}C=CH_{2}, C_{3}H_{8}, C_{3}H_{6}, RNH_{2}
O=C=S → CO + H_{2}S
O=C=O → CO + H_{2}O
S=C=N^{–} → H_{2}S + HCN
O=C=N^{–} → H_{2}O + HCN, CO + NH_{3}

Furthermore, dihydrogen functions as a competitive inhibitor, carbon monoxide functions as a non-competitive inhibitor, and carbon disulfide functions as a rapid-equilibrium inhibitor of nitrogenase.

Vanadium nitrogenases have also been shown to catalyze the conversion of CO into alkanes through a reaction comparable to Fischer-Tropsch synthesis.

== Organisms that synthesize nitrogenase ==
There are two types of bacteria that synthesize nitrogenase and are required for nitrogen fixation. These are:

- Free-living bacteria (non-symbiotic), examples include:
  - Cyanobacteria (blue-green algae)
  - Green sulfur bacteria
  - Azotobacter
- Mutualistic bacteria (symbiotic), examples include:
  - Rhizobium, associated with legumes
  - Azospirillum, associated with grasses
  - Frankia, associated with actinorhizal plants

== Evolution ==
=== Internal evolution ===
Nitrogenases are divided into three groups, clades, or classes, named using roman numerals I through III. The alternative nitrogenases are nested in class III. The same grouping is recovered from sequence comparison, as well as comparison of AlphaFold2-predicted structures. Nif-I is primarily found in aerobic or at least facultatively anaerobic diazotrophs with large Nif gene families, while the two other types are almost exclusively found in anaerobic diazotrophs with smaller gene networks. (The alternative nitrogenases break this pattern as they are found to co-occur with Group I and II.) Group I cannot have diverged more than 2.5 gigayears ago based on the timing of the Great Oxidation Event.

Ancestral sequence reconstruction has been used to reconstruct two group I nitrogenases, Anc2 representing the ancestor to all sampled nitrogenases in Gammaproteobacteria and Anc1 representing a smaller group built around Azotobacter vinelandii, Agaribacterium haliotis, and environmental samples. They work more slowly than the modern A. vinelandii version but keeps a similar efficiency in ATP use (the ratio between formed H_{2} and reduced N_{2} is largely unchanged at around 2.1, with the exception of Anc1B which is more efficient.)

=== Similarity to other proteins ===
The Nif genes include a maturase NifEN responsible for assembling the precursor to the P-cluster called an O-cluster and transferring it onto NifDK. It is also where the M-cluster is assembled with the help of nitrogenase component II NifH, before it is transferred to NifDK. Its structure is rather similar to the nitrogenase component I NifDK, except that it usually carries a P-cluster and a L-cluster (the precursor to the M-cluster). When NifEN from A. vinelandii is expressed in E. coli with the component II NifH, the resulting combination of proteins prove to work as a nitrogenase in vivo, boosting the growth of transformed E. coli in a nitrogen-deficient medium. The YfhL ferredoxin naturally present in E. coli is able to work with NifH. Among organisms carrying a Group III Nif, NifN is only found in archaea. The reason is unclear.

One interpretation of the nitrogen-fixing ability of NifEN and its similarity to NifDK is that there used to be a single nitrogenase with P- and L- clusters, before gene duplication and increased amounts of available Mo after the Great Oxidation Event allowed for the current situation to evolve (one copy became NifEN with the gain of M-cluster, the other became NifDK with the loss of P-cluster). Isotopic data suggests that Mo-based nitrogen fixation is no younger than 3.2 gigayears old. There is also a similarity between the α and β subunits in nitrogenase, its maturase, and related proteins; the two halves might have been a single gene of unknown function to begin with and became duplicated before nitrogenase diverged from BChNB. A large 2022 study mostly supports the view about NifEN and NifDK being formed by a duplication.

The three subunits of nitrogenase exhibit significant sequence similarity to three subunits of the light-independent version of protochlorophyllide reductase (DPOR, (ChlNB)_{2} + ChlL_{2}) that performs the conversion of protochlorophyllide to chlorophyll. This protein is present in gymnosperms, algae, and photosynthetic bacteria but has been lost by angiosperms during evolution. The structural similarity puts it in the same superfamily as nitrogenase. The enzyme for bacteriochlorophyll is similar and is called chlorophyllide oxidoreductase (COR, (BchNB)_{2} + BchL_{2} or (BchYZ)_{2} + BchX_{2}).

Separately, two of the nitrogenase subunits (NifD and NifH) have homologues in methanogens that do not fix nitrogen e.g. Methanocaldococcus jannaschii. Little is understood about the function of these "class IV" nif genes as of 2004, though they occur in many methanogens. In M. jannaschii they are known to interact with each other and are constitutively expressed. The "group IV" Nif are closer to Nif-I/II/III (the real nitrogenases) than DPOR and COR are. They do not have the DK vs EN duplication. The group has previously been considered paraphyletic, but a more recent analysis finds it monophyletic. There are two known kinds of functions: the CfbC type makes coenzyme F430 and the Mar type can make methionine, ethylene, and methane.

== Measurement of nitrogenase activity ==
As with many assays for enzyme activity, it is possible to estimate nitrogenase activity by measuring the rate of conversion of the substrate (N_{2}) to the product (NH_{3}). Since NH_{3} is involved in other reactions in the cell, it is often desirable to label the substrate with ^{15}N to provide accounting or "mass balance" of the added substrate. A more common assay, the acetylene reduction assay or ARA, estimates the activity of nitrogenase by taking advantage of the ability of the enzyme to reduce acetylene gas to ethylene gas. These gases are easily quantified using gas chromatography. Though first used in a laboratory setting to measure nitrogenase activity in extracts of Clostridium pasteurianum cells, ARA has been applied to a wide range of test systems, including field studies where other techniques are difficult to deploy. For example, ARA was used successfully to demonstrate that bacteria associated with rice roots undergo seasonal and diurnal rhythms in nitrogenase activity, which were apparently controlled by the plant.

Unfortunately, the conversion of data from nitrogenase assays to actual moles of N_{2} reduced (particularly in the case of ARA), is not always straightforward and may either underestimate or overestimate the true rate for a variety of reasons. For example, H_{2} competes with N_{2} but not acetylene for nitrogenase (leading to overestimates of nitrogenase by ARA). Bottle or chamber-based assays may produce negative impacts on microbial systems as a result of containment or disruption of the microenvironment through handling, leading to underestimation of nitrogenase. Despite these weaknesses, such assays are very useful in assessing relative rates or temporal patterns in nitrogenase activity.

== See also ==
- Nitrogen fixation
- Abiological nitrogen fixation
