= Bis(dinitrogen)bis(1,2-bis(diphenylphosphino)ethane)molybdenum(0) =

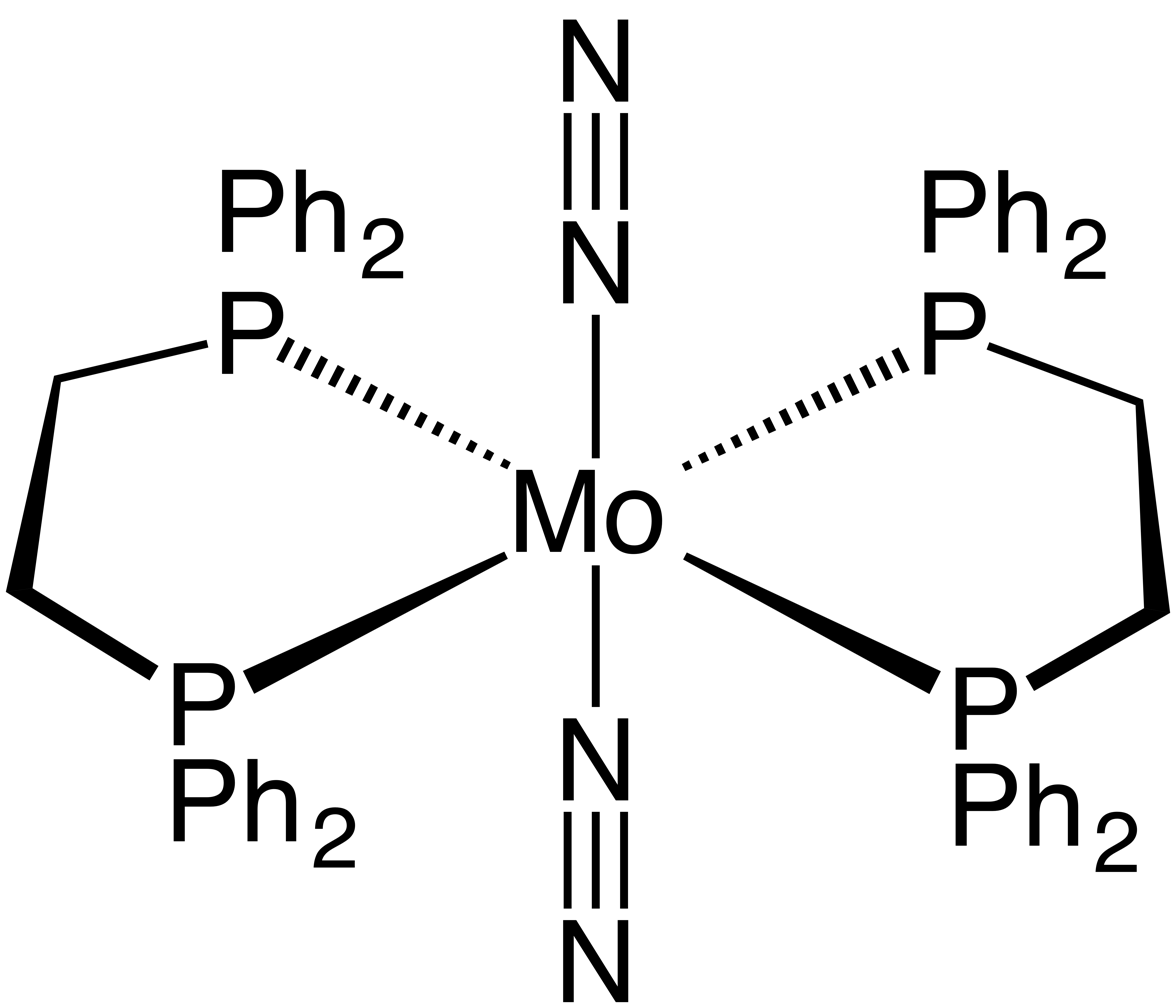

Identifiers
CAS Number	25145-64-6
3D model (JSmol)	Interactive image
ChEBI	CHEBI:30718
ChemSpider	9226469
Gmelin Reference	59731
PubChem CID	11051306
- InChI: InChI=1S/2C26H24P2.Mo.2N2/c2*1-5-13-23(14-6-1)27(24-15-7-2-8-16-24)21-22-28(25-17-9-3-10-18-25)26-19-11-4-12-20-26;;2*1-2/h2*1-20H,21-22H2;;; Key: ZEYRIXZZLVGNMH-UHFFFAOYSA-N
- SMILES: P(c1ccccc1)(c2ccccc2)CCP(c3ccccc3)c4ccccc4.P(c5ccccc5)(c6ccccc6)CCP(c7ccccc7)c8ccccc8.N#N.N#N.[Mo]

Properties
Chemical formula	C_{52}H_{48}MoN_{4}P_{4}
Molar mass	948.83 g·mol^{−1}
Appearance	Yellow-orange crystals
- Except where otherwise noted, data are given for materials in their standard state (at 25 °C [77 °F], 100 kPa). Infobox references

trans-Bis(dinitrogen)bis[1,2-bis(diphenylphosphino)ethane]molybdenum(0) is a coordination complex with the formula Mo(N_{2})_{2}(dppe)_{2}. It is a relatively air stable yellow-orange solid. It is notable as being the first discovered dinitrogen complex of molybdenum.

== Structure ==
Mo(N_{2})_{2}(dppe)_{2} is an octahedral complex with idealized D_{2h} point group symmetry. The dinitrogen ligands are mutually trans across the metal center. The Mo-N bond has a length of 2.01 Å, and the N-N bond has a length of 1.10 Å. This length is close to the free nitrogen bond length, but coordination to the metal weakens the N-N bond making it susceptible to electrophilic attack.

== Synthesis ==
The first synthetic route to Mo(N_{2})_{2}(dppe)_{2} involved a reduction of molybdenum(III) acetylacetonate with triethylaluminium in the presence of dppe and molecular nitrogen.

A higher yielding synthesis involves a four-step process. In the first step, molybdenum(V) chloride is reduced by acetonitrile (CH_{3}CN) to give [MoCl_{4}(CH_{3}CN)_{2}]. Acetonitrile is displaced by tetrahydrofuran (THF) to give [MoCl_{4}(THF)_{2}]. This Mo(IV) compound is reduced by tin powder to [MoCl_{3}(thf)_{3}]. The desired compound is formed in the presence of nitrogen gas, dppe ligand, and magnesium turnings as the reductant:

3 Mg + 2 MoCl_{3}(THF)_{3} + 4 Ph_{2}PCH_{2}CH_{2}PPh_{2} + 4 N_{2} → 2 trans-[Mo(N_{2})_{2}(Ph_{2}PCH_{2}CH_{2}PPh_{2})_{2}] + 3 MgCl_{2} + 6 THF

== Reactivity ==
The terminal nitrogen is susceptible to electrophilic attack, allowing for the fixation of nitrogen to ammonia in the presence of acid. In this way, Mo(N_{2})_{2}(dppe)_{2} serves as a model for biological nitrogen fixation. Carbon-nitrogen bonds can also be formed with this complex through condensation reactions with ketones and aldehydes, and substitution reactions with acid chlorides. The terminal nitrogen can also be silylated.
