= Main-group element-mediated activation of dinitrogen =

Chemical reactions

Main-group element-mediated activation of dinitrogen refers to the conversions of N_{2} by main group element compounds. The number of main group compounds derived from dinitrogen are few compared to the number of transition metal-based systems. In neither the main group nor the transition metal cases has any molecular compound proved useful. A commercial example of a main-group element-mediated activation of dinitrogen is the Frank–Caro process for the production of calcium cyanamide from calcium carbide.

== Activation by lithium ==
Metallic lithium burns in an atmosphere of nitrogen, giving lithium nitride. Hydrolysis of the resulting nitride gives ammonia. In a related process, trimethylsilyl chloride, lithium and nitrogen react in the presence of a catalyst to give tris(trimethylsilyl)amine, which can be further elaborated. Processes that involve oxidising the lithium metal are however of little practical interest, since they are non-catalytic and re-reducing the Li^{+} ion residue is difficult. The hydrogenation of Li_{3}N to produce ammonia has seen some exploration since the resulting lithium hydride can be thermally decomposed back to lithium metal.

== Activation by calcium ==
The Frank–Caro process is a commercial nitrogen fixation process involving the activation of N_{2} by calcium carbide. The conversion occurs at about 1,000 °C. The reaction is exothermic and self-sustaining once the reaction temperature is reached. Originally the reaction was conducted in large steel cylinders with an electrical resistance element providing heat to start the reaction. Modern production uses rotating ovens.

CaC_{2} + N_{2} → CaCN_{2} + C

Turning to molecular calcium chemistry, reduction of an iodo calcium(II) complex [CaI(BDI)]_{2} in the presence of THF under N_{2} gives [Ca(BDI)]_{2}N_{2}. The N-N distances in this product (1.258(3) and 1.268(3) Å) are much longer than that of the dinitrogen triple bond (1.098 Å) and comparable to other N=N double bonds.

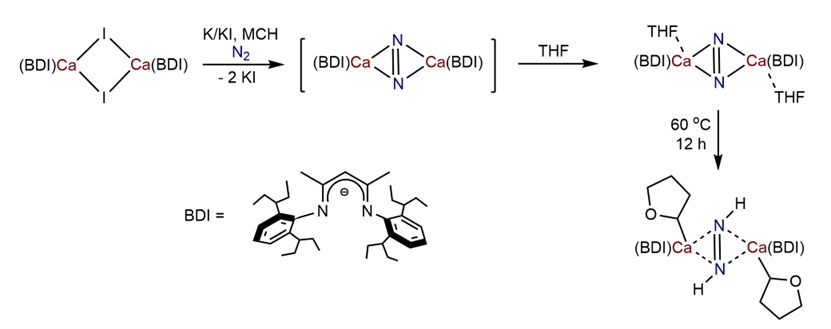
Nitrogen activation by Ca(I) species

== Activation by boron ==
2-Electron reduction of [(CAAC)BDurBr_{2}] induces binding of dinitrogen (CAAC = cyclic alkyl amino carbenes, Dur = durenyl). The initial step is proposed to involve a borylene radical binding to N_{2}. The dipotassium complex {[(CAAC)DurB]_{2}(μ^{2}-N_{2}K_{2})} was characterized by X-ray crystallography. Air-oxidation of the dipotassium complex gives the bis(borylene) diimide {[(CAAC)DurB]_{2}(μ^{2}-N_{2})}. Hydrolysis of the dipotassium compound gives the diradical {[(CAAC)DurB]_{2}(μ^{2}-N_{2}H_{2})}. Further protonation and reduction of {[(CAAC)DurB]_{2}(μ^{2}-N_{2}H_{2})} results in cleavage of the central N-N bond.

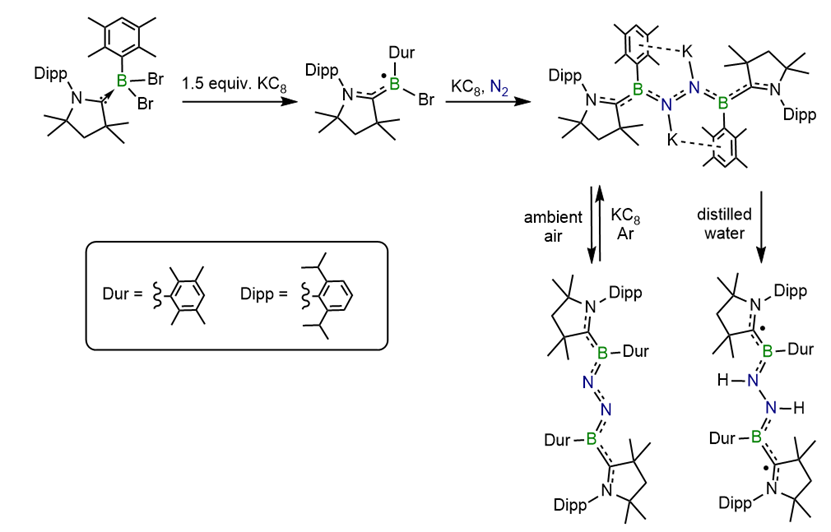
Nitrogen activation by borylenes

Repeating the same reaction but replacing Dur (2,3,5,6-tetramethyl-phenyl) by a bulkier Tip (2,4,6-triisopropylphenyl) group resulted in a different result, the product being {[(CAAC)-TipB]_{2}(μ^{2}-N_{4}K_{2})}. The product contains an N_{4} chain.

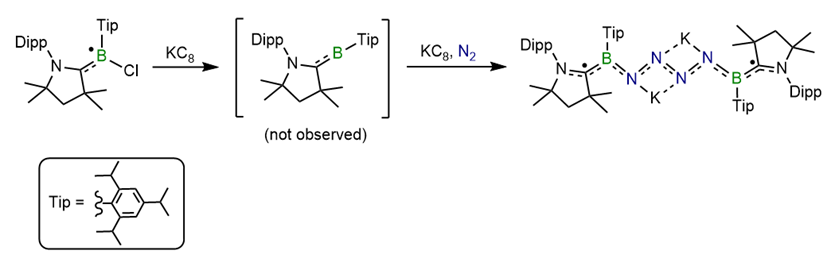
The reductive coupling of N2 molecules

N_{2} can be activated by in situ generated boron-centered radicals.

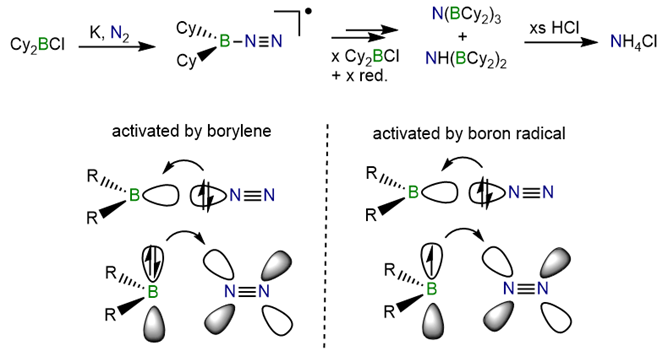
Nitrogen activation by boron radical

== Activation by carbon ==
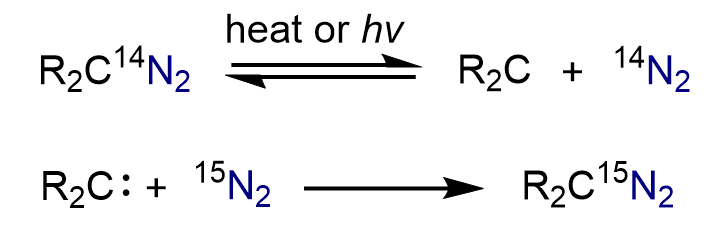
Reversible bonding between carbene and dinitrogen

Carbene species have also been considered as a means to bind N_{2}. The reaction of interest is the reverse of the decomposition of diazoalkanes with the release of N_{2}. For example, bromo(trifluoromethyl)carbene was shown to bind N_{2} to give 3-bromo-3-(trifluoromethyl)diazirines at low temperatures in an argon matrix.
