= Transition metal azide complex =

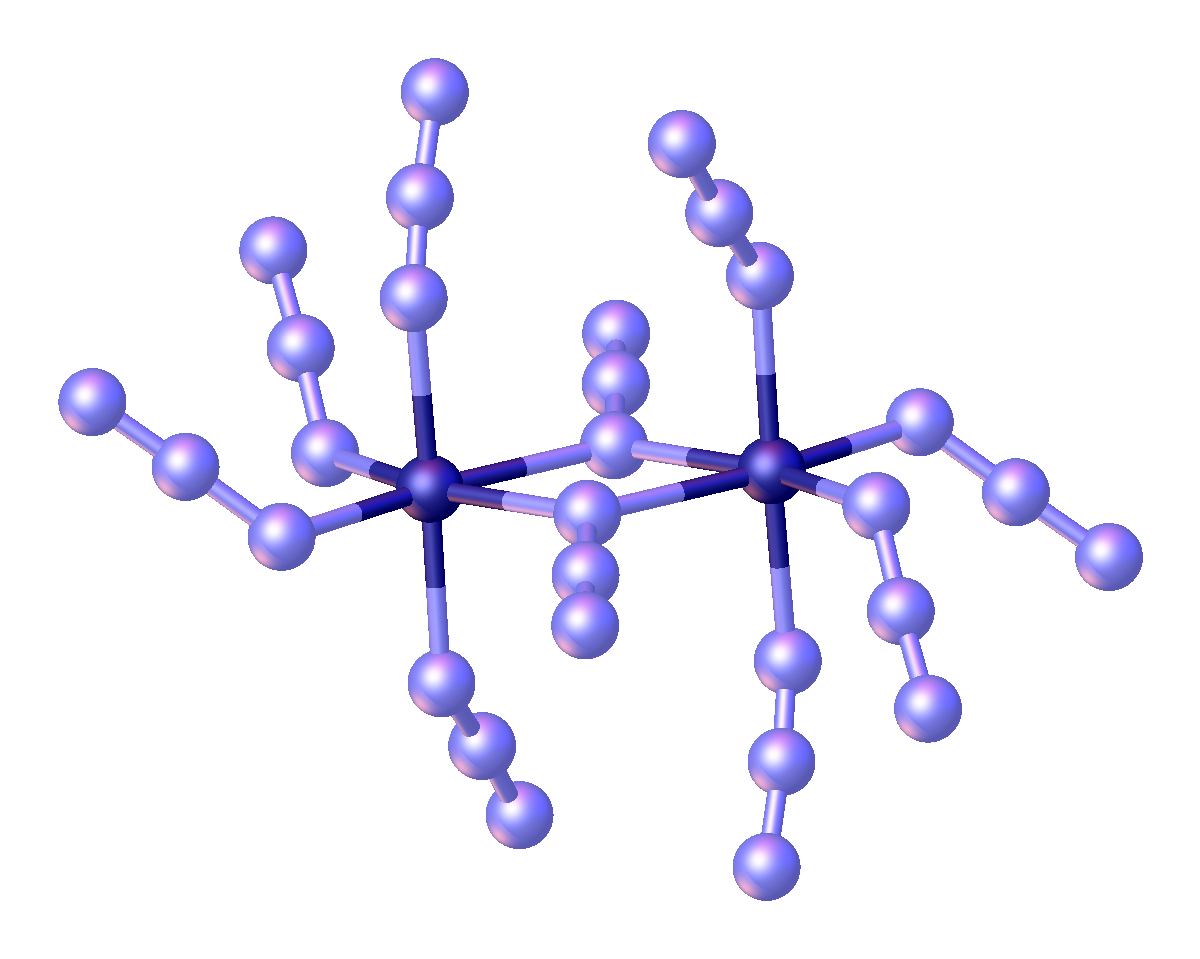
Structure of [Fe_{2}(N_{3})_{10}]^{4-}.

Transition metal azide complexes are coordination complexes containing one or more azide (N_{3}^{−}) ligands. In addition to coordination complexes, this article summarizes homoleptic transition metal azides, which are often coordination polymers.

== Structure and bonding ==
Azide is a pseudohalide but more nucleophilic than chloride, as reflected by the higher pKa of hydrazoic acid (4.6) vs hydrochloric acid (-5.9). As a monodentate ligand, azide binds through one of the two terminal nitrogen atoms, i.e. M-N=N=N. Azide is a "pure" sigma donor. It is classified as an X ligand in the Covalent bond classification method. In the usual electron counting method, it is a one-electron ligand.

The N_{3} unit is linear or nearly so. The M-N-N angles are quite bent. Azide functions as a bridging ligand via two bonding modes. Commonly the metals share the same nitrogen ("N-diazonium" mode). Less common is the motif M-N=N=N-M, illustrated by [Cu(N_{3})(PPh_{3})_{2}]_{2}.

== General synthetic methods ==
Traditionally, metal azide complexes are prepared by salt metathesis, e.g. the reaction of metal chlorides with sodium azide. In some cases, trimethylsilyl azide is employed as the azide source. Another popular route include acid-base reactions hydrazoic acid HN_{3} and either hydrido or lewis base complexes. Still other methods rely on halide-azide exchange with trimethylsilyl azide SiMe_{3}N_{3} with the metal fluorides as incomplete halide/azide exchange is often seen when using the chloride derivatives.

== Homoleptic complexes ==
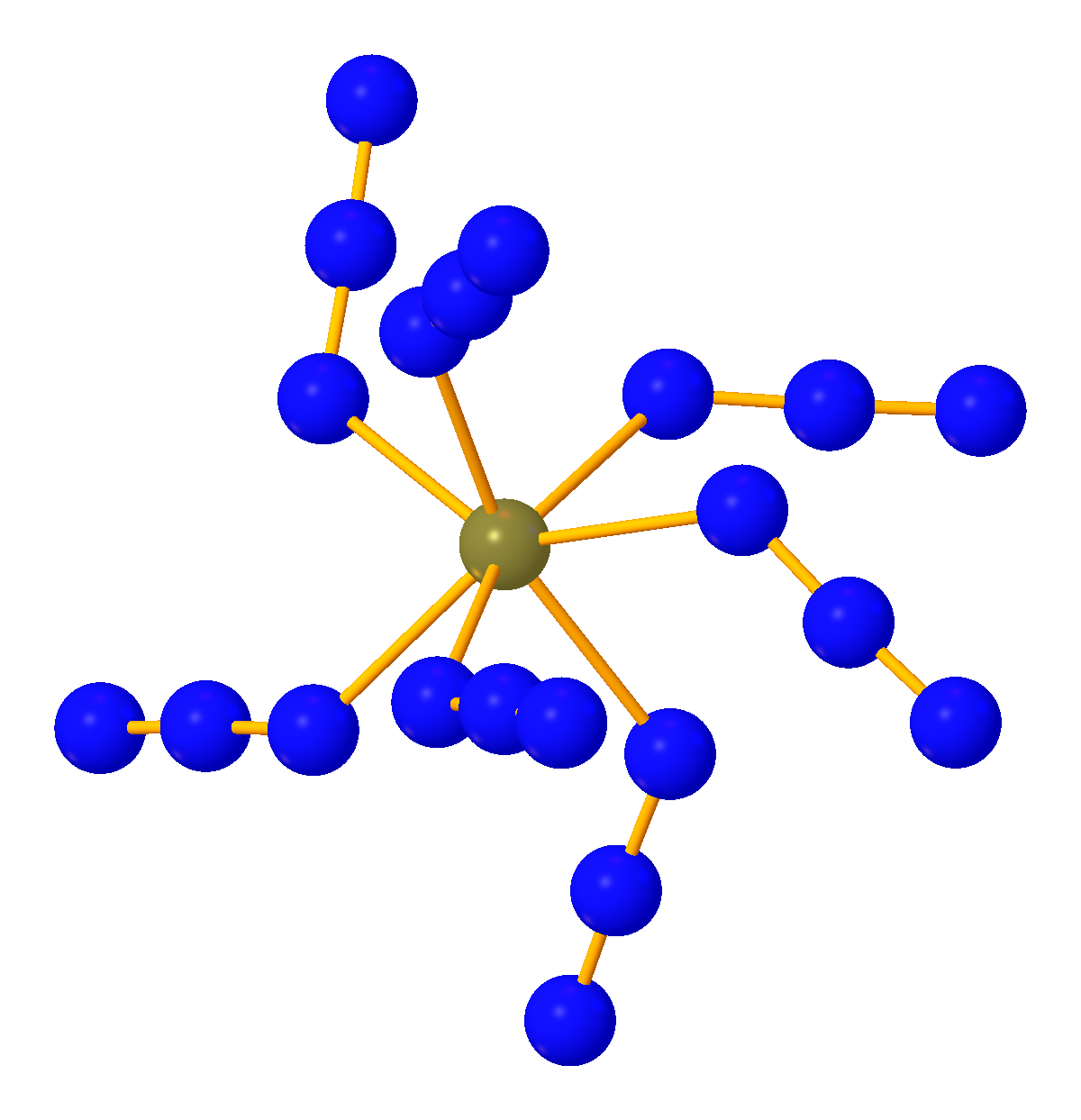
Structure of [Nb(N_{3})_{7}]^{2-}.-

Many homoleptic complexes (with only one kind of ligand) are known. Coordination numbers range from 2 (e.g., [Au(N_{3})_{2}]^{−}) to 7 (e.g., [W(N_{3})_{7}]^{−}). Many homoleptic complexes are octahedral anions of the type [M(N_{3})_{6}]^{n-}:

- dianions for tetravalent metals V, Pt, Ti, Zr, Hf
- trianions for trivalent metals Cr, Fe, Ru, Rh, Ir
- tetraanions for the divalent Ni

For some metals, homoleptic complexes exist in two oxidation states: [Au(N_{3})_{2}]^{−} vs [Au(N_{3})_{4}]^{−} and [Pt(N_{3})_{6}]^{2-} vs [Pt(N_{3})_{4}]^{2-}.

Binary azide compounds can take on several structures including discrete compounds, or one- two, and three-dimensional nets, leading some to dub them as "polyazides". Reactivity studies of azide compounds are relatively limited due to how sensitive they can be.

=== Group 3 ===
Neutral unsolvated group 3 polyazide is only known for divalent europium(II) compound, Eu(N_{3})_{2}. Attempts to react lanthanide hydroxides with HN_{3} result in their basic azides, Ln(OH)(N_{3})_{2} or Ln(OH)_{2}N_{3}.

=== Group 4 ===
Group 4 polyazides of the formula M(N_{3})_{4} are predicted to have linear or near linear M-N-N angles unlike their main group counterparts which are predicted to have bent M-N-N angles. This couldn’t be proved in the case of Ti(N_{3})_{4}, owing to difficulty in crystallization. However, incorporation of large spacer counterions or N-donor adducts makes the compounds far easier to work with. In the cases of [PPh_{4}]_{2}[M(N_{3})_{6}] (M=Ti, Zr, Hf), only the axial ligands exhibit near linear M-N-N angles whereas the equatorial ligands are closer to bent angles. This deviation in theory is also seen in the N-donor adducts.

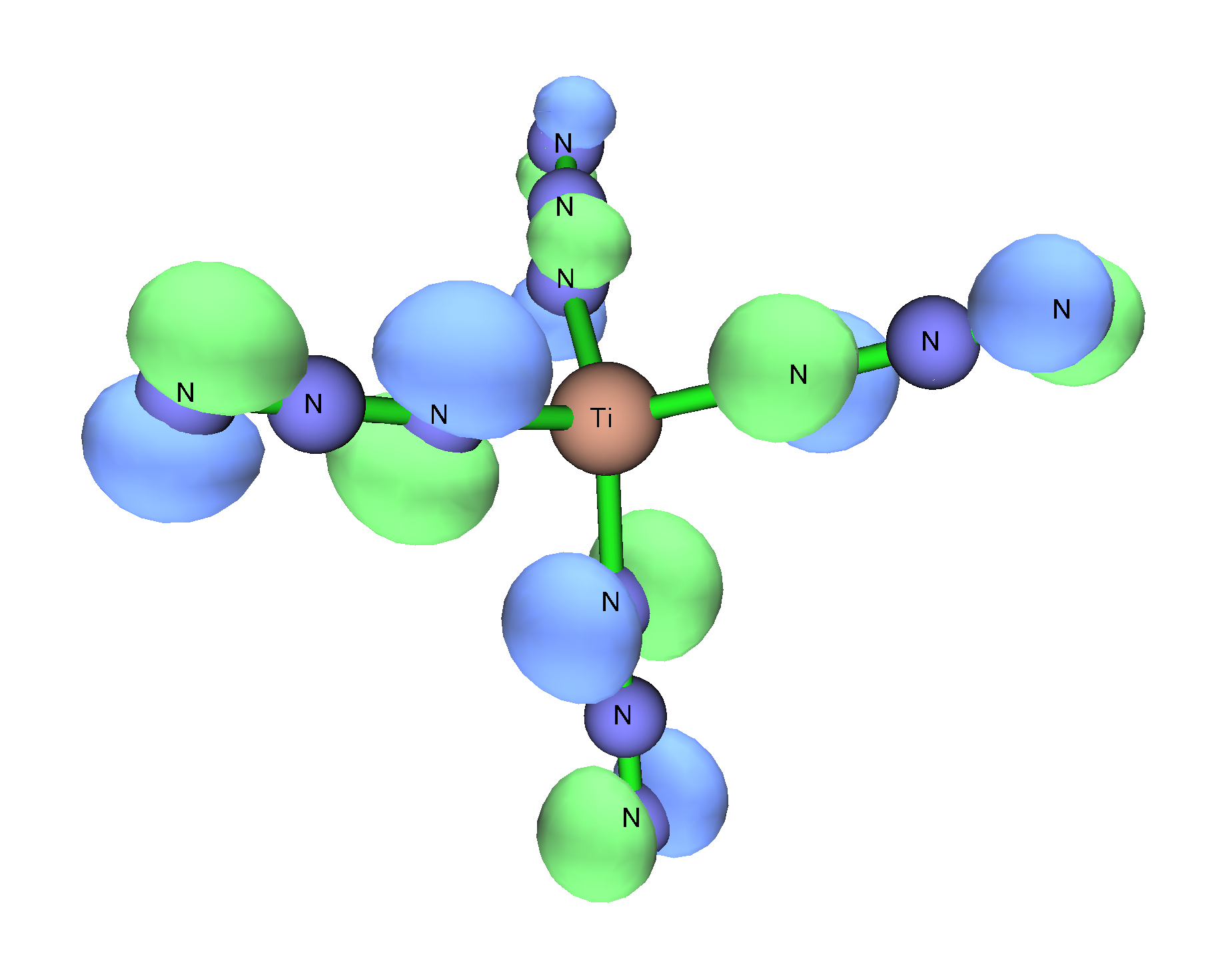
Highest Occupied Molecular Orbital (HOMO) of Ti(N_{3})_{4}

The main hypothesis given for why these compounds do not have linear M-N-N angles despite theoretical calculations is that these adducts are not tetrahedral. In the homoleptic tetrahedral compounds, the nitrogen closest to the (+IV) metal center is positioned in such a way that the three valence electron pairs can donate to the vacant d orbitals on the metal and therefore the azido can act as a tridentate donor ligand in which case the expected coordination would be linear. Since the adduct compounds are not tetrahedral, the azido group can only act as a monodentate donor with two sterically active electron pairs which result in a bent M-N-N bond angles.

=== Group 5 ===
The neutral binary V(IV) azide as well as V(III), V(IV), and V(V) azido ions are known. Similar to the neutral Ti(IV) azide, V(N_{3})_{4} is difficult to study due to high shock and temperature instability. However, [V(N_{3})_{6}]^{2-} paired with a large, inert counterion is relatively stable and crystalizeses as a near perfect octahedral. In contrast to V(IV), the neutral binary V(V) could not be synthesized and attempts result in the reduction of V(V) to V(IV) with the elimination of N_{2} gas. Fortunately, the oxidation potentials of anions are lower than that of their parent compounds so [V(N_{3})_{6}]^{−} can be formed. Unlike [V(N_{3})_{6}]^{2-}, [V(N_{3})_{6}]^{−} is highly shock sensitive and distorted from octahedral symmetry with three long and three short M-N bonds in mer positions.

The neutral binary Nb(N_{3})_{5} and Ta(N_{3})_{5} also exist, and the acetonitrile adducts of these compounds contain a nearly linear azido trans to the coordinating acetonitrile. They represent the first evidence of linear M-N-N bonding. The corresponding anions [Nb(N_{3})_{6}]^{−}, [Nb(N_{3})_{7}]^{2-}, [Ta(N_{3})_{6}]^{−}, and [Ta(N_{3})_{7}]^{2-} are known and accordingly are much less shock sensitive. The structure of the hexaazido monoanions are similar to other heptaazido monoanions with bent azido ligands despite being predicted to have perfect S_{6} symmetry in the gas phase for [Nb(N_{3})_{6}]. The heptaazido dianions possess monocapped triangular-prismatic 1/4/2 structures unlike the actinide trianion [U(N_{3})_{7}]^{3-} which crystallizes as a monocapped octahedron or pentagonal bipyramid. Several N-donor adducts are known to exist as well. Reactions of the neutral binary NbF_{5} and TaF_{5} in the presence of Me_{3}SiN_{3} with N-donors containing small bite angles such as 2,2’-bipyridine or 1,10-phenanthroline result in self ionization products of the type [M(N_{3})_{4}L_{2}]^{+}[M(N_{3})_{6}]^{−} (L= N-donor) whereas N-donors containing large bite angles such as 3,3’-bipryidine or 4,4’-bipyridine produces the neutral pentaazide adducts M(N_{3})_{5}•L (L=N-donor).

=== Group 6 ===
Both Mo(N_{3})_{6} and W(N_{3})_{6} have been synthesized, and W(N_{3})_{6} is stable enough to grow single crystals. Contrary to group 4 and group 5 binary azido compounds, the anionic [Mo(N_{3})_{7}]^{−} and [W(N_{3})_{7}]^{−} are less stable and more sensitive to handle than their neutral parent compounds. Upon warming solutions of the heptaazido anions in either MeCN or SO_{2} to room temperature, the tetraazido nitrido ions [NMo(N_{3})_{4}]^{−} and [NW(N_{3})_{4}]^{−} are formed with elimination of N_{2}.

=== Group 7 ===
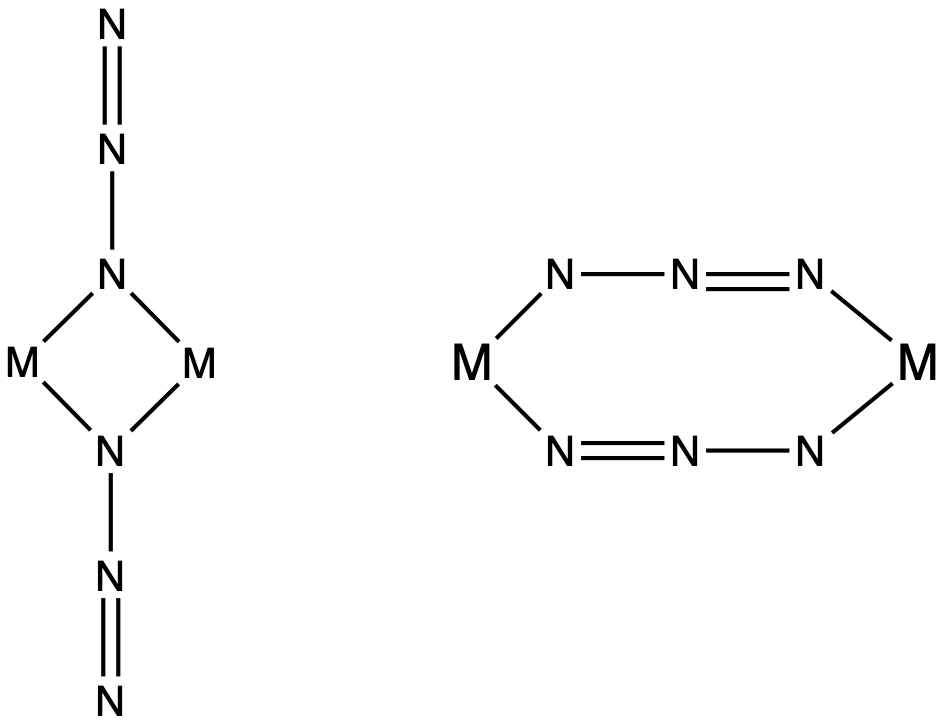
End-on (EO) [left] and end-to-end (EE) [right] binding modes of the azido ligand

The first Mn polyazide compound was prepared by Wöhler et al. in 1917 by reaction of MnCO_{3} with HN_{3} to form Mn(N_{3})_{2}. Many divalent Mn azide salts have been synthesized. 1D chains are formed when 2,2’-bipyridine, a bidentate ligand, is used as the counter ion in the reaction between Mn(ClO_{4})_{2} • 6H_{2}O and excess NaN_{3}. This results in a chain with alternating EE and EO bridges which predictably gives alternating antiferromagnetic-ferromagnetic coupling. Another 2D structure is accessed via the reaction of (PPh_{4})_{2}MnCl_{2} with AgN_{3} to form the [PPh_{4}]_{2}[Mn(N_{3})_{4}].

The first example of a 3D azido compound was [N(CH_{3})_{4}][Mn(N_{3})_{3}]. This compound has a pseudo-perovskite structure with [N(CH_{3})_{4}]^{+} ions in the cavities between the Mn centers. The azido moieties are arranged in an EE fashion, and indeed, this compound exhibits the expected antiferromagnetic behavior. The cesium analogue Cs[Mn(N_{3})_{3}] is synthesized in a similar manner. For each 6 coordinate Mn, four of the azido linkages are EE and two are EO instead of all six being EE. This arrangement results in a honeycomb-like shape and a rare example of alternating ferro-antiferromagnetic interactions in 3D solid.

Examples of manganese azido compounds in higher oxidation states are rare. The triazide acetonitrile adduct can be prepared using the fluoride exchange route to give Mn(N_{3})_{3}CN as a dark red shock sensitive compound. Upon addition of PPh_{4}N_{3} the compound disproportionates into an insensitive mixture of [PPh_{4}]_{2}[Mn(N_{3})_{2}] and [PPh_{4}]_{2}[Mn(N_{3})_{6}]. The Mn(IV) salt can be prepared on its own by using Cs_{2}MnF_{6} as the starting material to give the highly explosive Cs_{2}[Mn(N_{3})_{6}].

=== Group 8 ===
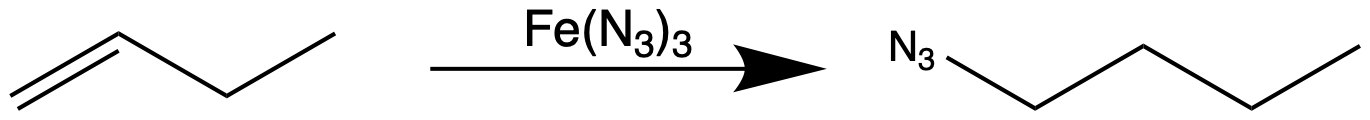
Anti-Markovnikov addition of an azide to an alkene using Fe(N_{3})_{3}

Pentaazidoiron (III) ion [Fe(N_{3})_{5}]^{2-} can be made by treating iron(III) salts with sodium azide. An iron azide reagent can be generated in situ. NaN_{3} and iron (III) sulfate Fe_{2}(SO_{4})_{3} are combined in methanol and added to an organoborane followed by slow addition of 30% hydrogen peroxide, presumably forming Fe(N_{3})_{3}. When combined with alkenes, the equivalent of hydrogen azide add in an anti-Markovnikov fashion.

[n-Bu_{4}N]_{3}[Ru(N_{3})_{6}] is prepared by treating K_{2}[Ru^{IV}Cl_{6}] with NaN_{3}. N_{2} gas is liberated in this reaction, which involves reduction of Ru(IV) to Ru(III).

=== Group 9 ===
Tetraazido cobalt(II) compounds have been isolated as both the tetraphenylphosphonium and tetraphenylarsonium salts from solutions of cobalt sulfate with a 15 time sexcess of NaN_{3} to yield [Ph_{4}P]_{2}[Co(N_{3})_{4}] and [Ph_{4}As]_{2}[Co(N_{3})_{4}] respectively. The autooxidation of solutions of [Co(N_{3})_{4}]^{2-} can be used as a colorimetric spot test for the presence of sulfite ions.

Tetrabutylammonium salts of rhodium(III) and iridium(III) azides are known and are prepared by reacting a large excess of NaN_{3} in an aqueous solution with the corresponding Na_{3}[MCl_{6}] • 12H_{2}O metal chloride salt to form [n-Bu_{4}N]_{3}[Rh(N_{3})_{6}] and [n-Bu_{4}N]_{3}[Ir(N_{3})_{6}].

=== Group 10 ===
The binary nickel azide Ni(N_{3})_{2} has been prepared by distilling HN_{3} onto nickel carbonate. Samples of Ni(N_{3})_{2} decompose upon heating .

[Pd(N_{3})_{4}]^{2-} anions are square planar and the degree of interaction between the anion and its corresponding cation can be determined by the amount of deviation in the torsion angles from the ideal geometry. Various platinates [Pt(N_{3})_{4}]^{2-} and [Pt(N_{3})_{6}]^{4-} are known and are prepared from Pt chloride salts with NaN_{3}. Pt(II) salts tend to be far less stable than the Pt(IV) versions, and they either decompose fairly rapidly upon standing or explode. Their sensitivity in part has been explained by poor crystal packing.

=== Group 11 ===
Both copper(I) and copper(II) azides are known. The binary copper(I) azide, CuN_{3}, which is white, is a one-dimensional polymer. Molecular Copper (II) azides include salts of [Cu(N_{3})_{4}]^{2-} and [Cu(N_{3})_{6}]^{2-}. {[Cu(N_{3})_{3}]^{−}}_{n} forms 1D chains wherein octahedral Cu(II) centers are linked by both EE and EO bridging azides. All copper azides are explosive but their sensitivities vary widely from the parent azides CuN_{3} and Cu(N_{3})_{2} which are extremely sensitive to the ions paired with large countercations that are practically insensitive.

Silver (I) azide is a well known explosive compound and has been demonstrated to form a 2D coordination polymer with square planar Ag^{+} ions surrounded by azido ligands in an EE fashion. Slow ramping of temperature from 150 °C to 251 °C results in melting and slow decomposition but rapid heating to 300 °C results in an explosion.

Gold(III) azide is known as the tetraethylammonium salt [Et_{4}N][Au(N_{3})_{4}] and also adopts a square planar structure. However unlike the silver azide, the gold azide is not stable at room temperature and will decompose after a few days and its metal azide bonds have significant covalent character.

=== Group 12 ===
While Zn(N_{3})_{2} has been known since the late 1890s, solvent free Zn(N_{3})_{2} was isolated for the first time in 2016 from a dry ethereal solution of HN_{3} and Et_{2}Zn in n-hexane. Zn(N_{3})_{2} crystallizes in three different polymorphs α-Zn(N_{3})_{2} and the labile β-Zn(N_{3})_{2} and γ-Zn(N_{3})_{2} forms.

The first mercury (I) azide was realized by Curtius in 1890 by combining aqueous mercury(I) salts with alkali metal azides and by combining HN_{3} with elemental mercury to produce Hg_{2}(N_{3})_{2}. Both mercury (I) and mercury(II) azides can be easily prepared by mixing the respective mercury nitrates with sodium azide in aqueous solution at roomtemperature. The mercury (II) azide Hg(N_{3})_{2} exists in two polymorphs α-Hg(N_{3})_{2} and β-Hg(N_{3})_{2.} The β form is very labile and quickly turns into the α polymorphs at room temperature. However, the β polymorph can prepared in analogy to β-Pb(N_{3})_{2} by slow diffusion of aqueous NaN_{3} into a solution of Hg(NO_{3})_{2} separated by a layer of aqueous NaNO_{3}, but crystals nearly always explode during formation leading to a mixture of α and β polymorphs.

Binary cadmium azide Cd(N_{3})_{2} can be prepared from CdCO_{3} and aqueous HN_{3}. However, it is structural unrelated to the mercury or zinc anaolgues and is based on repeat units of Cd_{2}(N_{3})_{10} double octahedrals.

=== Mixed ligand complexes ===
Structure of trans-PdN_{3}(CH_{3})(PMe_{3})_{2}. Distances are in picometers.

Azide forms myriad mixed ligand complexes. Examples include Zn(N_{3})_{2}(NH_{3})_{2} and (C_{5}H_{5})_{2}Ti(N_{3})_{2}.

== Reactions ==
A characteristic reaction of azide complexes and compounds) is degradation via loss of nitrogen gas. The stoichiometry for a diazide compound is:

M(N_{3})_{2} → 2 M + 3 N_{2}

The process often occurs explosively.

Azide ligands are react with nitrosonium to give nitrous oxide. This reaction is used to generate coordinatively unsaturated complexes.

[Co(NH_{3})_{5}N_{3}]^{2+} + NO^{+} + H_{2}O → [Co(NH_{3})_{5}(H_{2}O)]^{3+} + N_{2}O + N_{2}

This approach was used to prepare the previously elusive dicationic complex pentamminecobalt(III) perchlorate, [Co(NH_{3})_{5}(OClO_{3})]^{2+}.

== See also ==
- Main group azido compounds
