= Metal nitrido complex =

Coordination compound and metal cluster type

Metal nitrido complexes are coordination compounds and metal clusters that contain an atom of nitrogen bound only to transition metals. These compounds are molecular, i.e. discrete, in contrast to the polymeric, dense nitride materials that are useful in materials science. The distinction between the molecular and solid-state polymers is not always very clear as illustrated by the materials Li_{6}MoN_{4} and more condensed derivatives such as Na_{3}MoN_{3}. Transition metal nitrido complexes have attracted interest in part because it is assumed that nitrogen fixation proceeds via nitrido intermediates. Nitrido complexes have long been known, the first example being salts of [OsO_{3}N]^{−}, described in the 19th century.

== Structural trends ==
Mononuclear complexes feature terminal nitride ligands, typically with short M-N distances consistent with metal ligand multiple bonds. For example, in the anion in PPh_{4}[MoNCl_{4}], the Mo-N distance is 163.7 pm. The occurrence of terminal nitrido ligands follow the patterns seen for oxo complexes: they are more common for early and heavier metals. Many bi- and polynuclear complexes are known with bridging nitrido ligands. More exotic metal nitrido complexes are also possible, such as a recently reported compound containing a terminal uranium nitride (-U≡N) bond.

Example metal nitrido complexes

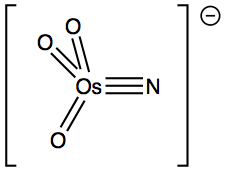
[OsO_{3}N]^{−}, isoelectronic with osmium tetroxide.

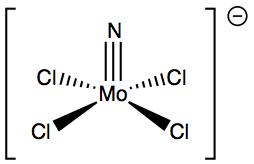
[MoNCl_{4}]^{−}, a square pyramidal Mo(VI) complex.

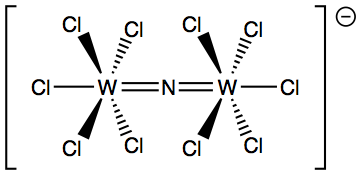
[W_{2}(μ-N)Cl_{10}]^{−}, containing two W(VI) centres bridged by a nitrido ligand.

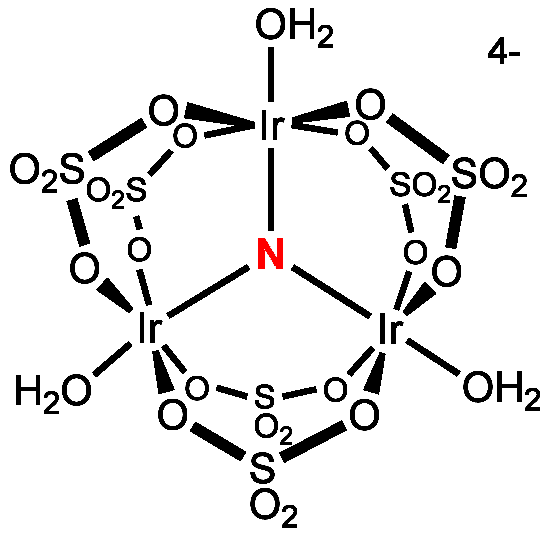
[Ir_{3}N(SO_{4})_{6}(H_{2}O)_{3}]^{4−}, structurally related to basic iron acetate.

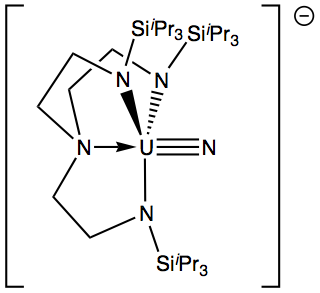
A uranium nitrido complex.

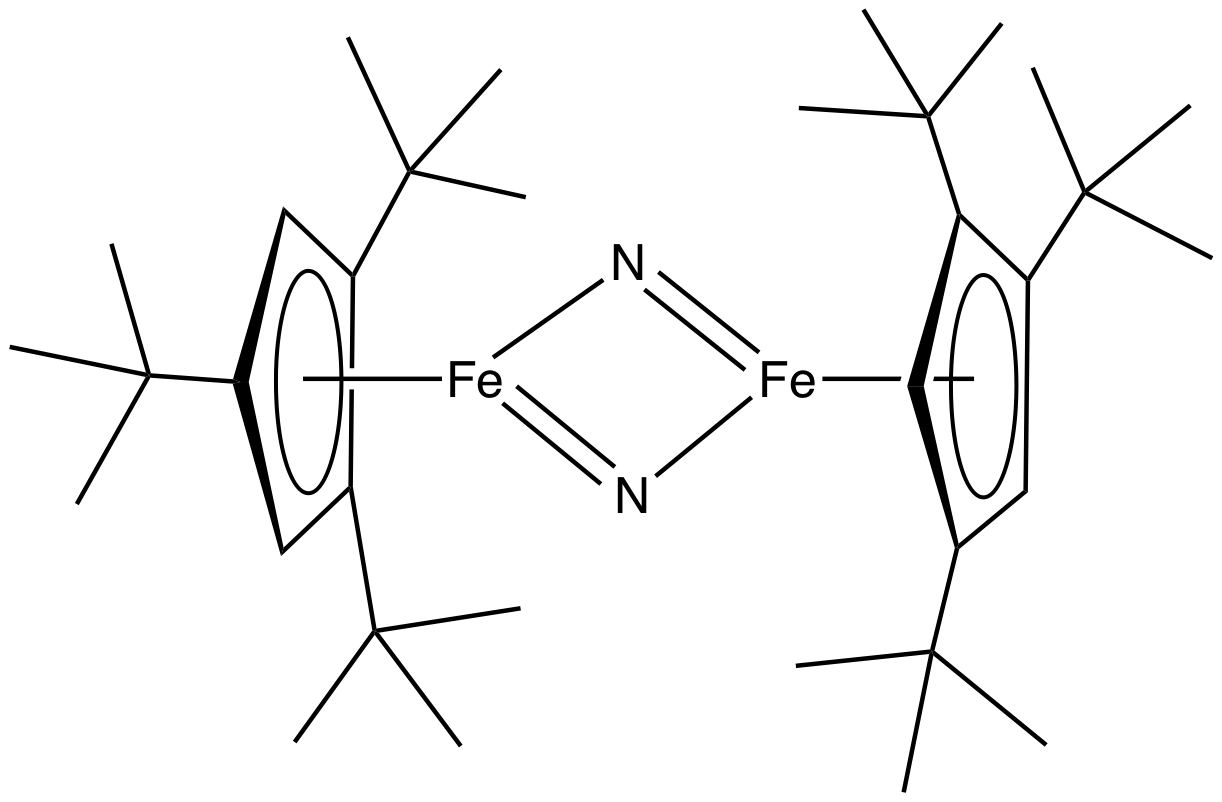
((t-Bu)_{3}C_{5}H_{2})_{2}Fe_{2}N_{2}.

== Preparative routes ==
Metal nitrido complexes are produced using a variety of nitrogen sources. The first example above is prepared from amide (NH_{2}^{−}) as the N^{3−} source:

OsO_{4} + KNH_{2} → KOsO_{3}N + H_{2}O

Most commonly however, nitrido complexes are produced by decomposition of azido complexes. The driving force for these reactions is the great stability of the N_{2} leaving group.

Alternatively, chlorothiazido ligands (M-N-S-Cl; see also metal thionitrosyl complexes) react with bases to give nitrido complexes.

Nitrogen trichloride is an effective reagent to give chloro-nitrido complexes.

Some three-coordinated Mo(III) complexes cleave N_{2} to give nitrides. These complexes are so bulky that they cannot readily form Mo≡Mo bonds. In such cases, an intermediate bridging dinitrogen can be observed.

2 Mo(NR_{2})_{3} + N_{2} → (R_{2}N)_{3}Mo-N_{2}-Mo(NR_{2})_{3}
(R_{2}N)_{3}Mo-N_{2}-Mo(NR_{2})_{3} → 2 N≡Mo(NR_{2})_{3}

== Reactions of nitrido ligands ==
The nitride ligand can be electrophilic and nucleophilic, depending on the metal and other ligands. Terminal nitrides of early metals tend to be basic and oxidizable, whereas nitrides of the later metals tend to be oxidizing and electrophilic. The former behavior is illustrated by their N-protonation and N-alkylation. Ru and Os nitrido complexes often add organophosphines to give iminophosphine derivatives containing the R_{3}PN^{−} ligand.

Some metal nitrido complexes have been used to make nitriles.

== Interstitial nitrides ==
Owing to the ability of nitrido ligands to serve as a bridging ligand, several metal clusters are known to contain nitride ligands at their center. Such nitrido ligands are termed interstitial. In some cases, the nitride is completely encased in the center of six or more metals and cannot undergo reactions, although it contributes to the intermetallic bonding.

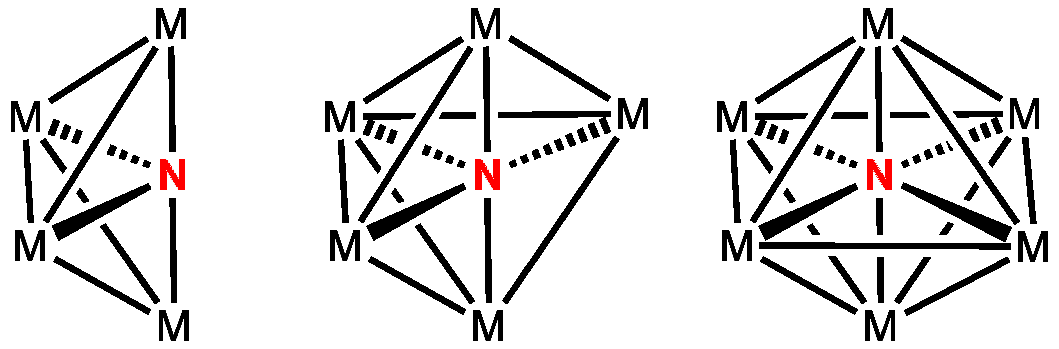
This series is known for M = Fe(CO)_{3}.

== See also ==
- Abiological nitrogen fixation
- Transition metal dinitrogen complex
