= Sulfonyl diisocyanate =

Names
- IUPAC name Sulfuryl diisocyanate
- Other names: Dicarbonyl-sulfamid; Sulfuryl bisisocyanate

Identifiers
CAS Number	4223-09-0
3D model (JSmol)	Interactive image
ChemSpider	70290
ECHA InfoCard	100.021.974
EC Number	224-170
PubChem CID	77898
CompTox Dashboard (EPA)	DTXSID70195053
- InChI: InChI=1S/C2N2O4S/c5-1-3-9(7,8)4-2-6 Key: BUXTXUBQAKIQKS-UHFFFAOYSA-N
- SMILES: O=C=NS(=O)(=O)N=C=O

Properties
Chemical formula	C_{2}N_{2}O_{4}S
Molar mass	148.09 g·mol^{−1}
Appearance	Volatile liquid
Density	1.66 g/cm^{3}
Melting point	−20 °C (−4 °F; 253 K)
Boiling point	264.6 °C (508.3 °F; 537.8 K)
Solubility in water	reacts
Refractive index (n_{D})	1.574

Hazards
Flash point	113.9 °C (237.0 °F; 387.0 K)
- Except where otherwise noted, data are given for materials in their standard state (at 25 °C [77 °F], 100 kPa). Infobox references

Sulfonyl diisocyanate is an organic chemical compound of carbon, nitrogen, oxygen, and sulphur with the molecular formula C_{2}N_{2}O_{4}S.

== Synthesis ==
Sulfonyl diisocyanate is obtainable directly from certain proportions of cyanogen bromide (BrCN) and sulfur trioxide:

2 BrCN + 2 SO_{3} → SO_{2}(NCO)_{2} + Br_{2} + SO_{2}

The compound can also be obtained by reacting chlorosulfonyl isocyanate (ClSO_{2}NCO), produced by reaction of cyanogen chloride (ClCN) and SO_{3} with silver cyanate (AgNCO) at 150 °C (302 °F).

== Physical properties ==
Sulfonyl diisocyanate is a volatile, colorless to pale yellow liquid that reacts violently with water to form carbon dioxide (CO_{2}) and sulfamide (SO_{2}(NH_{2})_{2}). The compound remains stable in sealed containers.

== Chemical properties ==
Sulfuryl diisocyanate reacts with dimethyl sulfoxide in acetonitrile to form sulfonyl bis (dimethylsulfilimine):

SO_{2}(NCO)_{2} + Me_{2}SO → SO_{2}[N=SMe_{2}]_{2} + 2 CO_{2}

== See also ==
- Chlorosulfonyl isocyanate
- Fluorosulfonyl isocyanate
- Fluorosulfonyl azide
- Trifluoromethanesulfonyl azide
