= Bergmann degradation =

Chemical reaction

The Bergmann degradation is a series of chemical reactions designed to remove a single amino acid from the carboxylic acid (C-terminal) end of a peptide. First demonstrated by Max Bergmann in 1934, it is a rarely used method for sequencing peptides. The later developed Edman degradation is an improvement upon the Bergmann degradation, instead cleaving the N-terminal amino acid of peptides to produce a hydantoin containing the desired amino acid.

The Bergmann degradation follows the earlier work of Bergmann and his close colleague Leonidas Zervas, combining the organic azide degradation of the Curtius rearrangement with the Bergmann-Zervas carbobenzoxy method, which they designed to occur under relatively mild conditions so as to allow peptide sequencing. A single round of the Bergmann degradation yields an aldehyde containing the sought after amino acid residue and the remaining fragment of the original peptide in amide form.

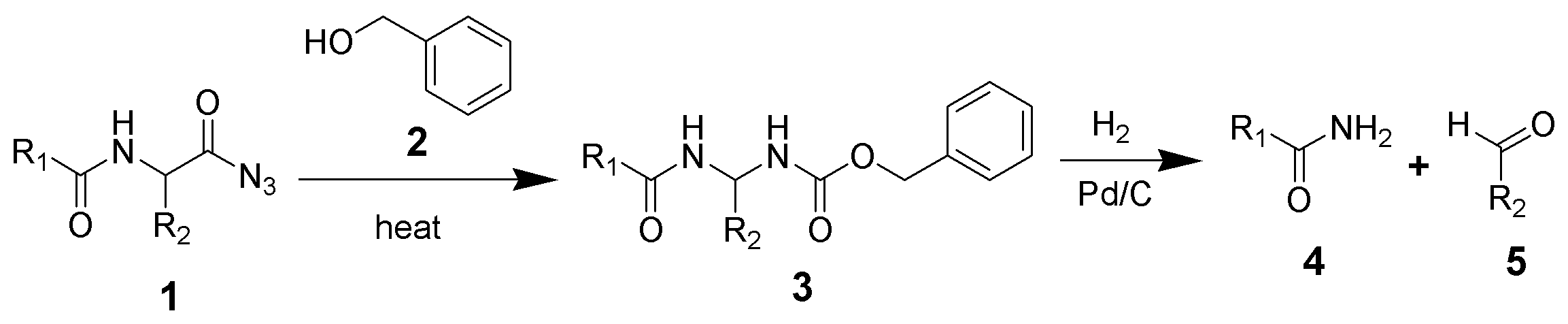
The Bergmann degradation

The acyl azide of a peptide (1) undergoes a Curtius rearrangement in the presence of benzyl alcohol and heat(2) to give a benzyl carbamate (3). The Cbz group of intermediate 3 is removed by hydrogenolysis to give an unsubstituted amide (4) and an aldehyde (5).

== Mechanism ==
The Bergmann degradation begins with benzoylation at the alpha-group of a peptide and subsequent conversion to an acyl azide. As in the Curtius rearrangement, the acyl azide, in the presence of benzyl alcohol and heat, rearranges to a highly reactive isocyanate intermediate, releasing nitrogen gas in the process. The isocyanate in turn reacts with benzyl alcohol to form a benzylurethane (also referred to as carboxybenzyl), a compound possessing a carbamate amine protecting group. Subsequent removal of the carbamate protecting group is carried out by catalytic hydrogenation in the presence of hydrochloric acid followed by addition to boiling water, yielding an unstable intermediate that rapidly rearranges to release carbon dioxide, driving the reaction forward. This leads to further rearrangement and subsequent hydrolysis, ultimately resulting in the formation of an aldehyde bearing the next amino acid residue in the sequencing series and the expulsion of the residual peptide in amide form.

Mechanism of the Bergmann degradation

A mechanism has been proposed which depicts catalytic hydrogenation of the benzylurethane as a concerted rearrangement that releases carbon dioxide concomitantly with formation of the amide.

== Preparation of azide ==
The aforementioned conversion to acyl azide has been carried out multifariously; Bergmann utilized methyl ester and hydrazide, whereas more recent attempts have designed methods such as: nitrosylation of N-formylaminoacyl hydrazide and subsequent substitution by sodium azide, reaction of a carboxylic acid with diphenyl phosphorazidate, triethylamine, and a hydroxyl component, and reaction between TMS azide and the anhydride of an amino acid.

== Applications ==
The Bergmann degradation is intended for and has been used as a method for peptide sequencing. It was also proposed for use in cleaving the 3,4-bond of the penicillin nucleus. The compound 2,2-dimethyl-6-phthalimido-3-penamyl isocyanate was arrived at through various means, including the Curtius rearrangement, and it was envisioned that it could undergo the Bergmann degradation to form the desired aldehyde as well as the urea by-product. Though the Bergmann degradation was indeed possible, it was discovered that simple dilute acid hydrolysis would suffice in forming the desired product.

== Curtius rearrangement ==
The Bergmann degradation makes use of the azide degradation described by the Curtius rearrangement. Curtius also attempted to degrade benzoylated amino acids; however, his method involved splitting the carbamate with strongly energetic treatment with acids, which lead to decomposition of the resultant aldehyde and acid amides. This convinced Bergmann that Curtius' azide degradation could be followed by treatment with benzyl alcohol (his carbobenzoxy method) to isolate the resultant amino acid aldehyde and residual peptide amide for sequencing purposes.

== Edman degradation ==
The Edman degradation is an alternative method for peptide sequencing that cleaves amino acid residues from the N-terminus of a peptide. In 1950 Edman designed a reaction with phenylthiocyanate (the idea for which was borrowed from a 1927 study by Bergmann, Kann and Miekeley ) to give phenylthiocarbamyl peptides followed by hydrolysis under relatively mild conditions to cleave N-terminal amino acid as phenylthiohydantoin. Phenylthiohydantoin is stable enough to undergo various sequencing procedures such as those which involve chromatography and mass spectrometry. This was an improvement on an earlier method proposed by Abderhalden and Brockmann in 1930 that demonstrated N-terminal amino acid conversion to a hydantoin under stronger hydrolytic conditions, where some cleavage of the residual peptide proved problematic. The primary advantage the Edman degradation has over the Bergmann degradation is the ease with which the residual peptide can re-enter the process due to retention of its structure throughout sequential cleaving. Repetition of the Bergmann degradation is presumably not as straightforward, as the remaining peptide is in amide form.

== See also ==
- Curtius rearrangement
- Edman degradation
