= Werther (disambiguation) =

Werther is an opera by Jules Massenet.

Werther may also refer to:

== Places ==
- Werther, North Rhine-Westphalia, a town in western Germany
- Werther, Thuringia, a municipality in eastern Germany

== People with the surname ==
- Fanny Fee Werther (born 1994), German journalist
- Gustav Werther (1815–1869), German chemist
- Heinrich Wilhelm von Werther (1772–1859), Prussian diplomat and politician

== Arts ==
- The Sorrows of Young Werther, a novel by Johann Wolfgang von Goethe that the opera Werther is loosely based on
- Werther (1986 film), a Spanish film based on the novel
- Werther (1927 film), a Czech film

== Others ==
- Werther's Original, a toffee-and-cream candy
- The New Werther, by the statistician Karl Pearson
