= Journal für praktische Chemie =

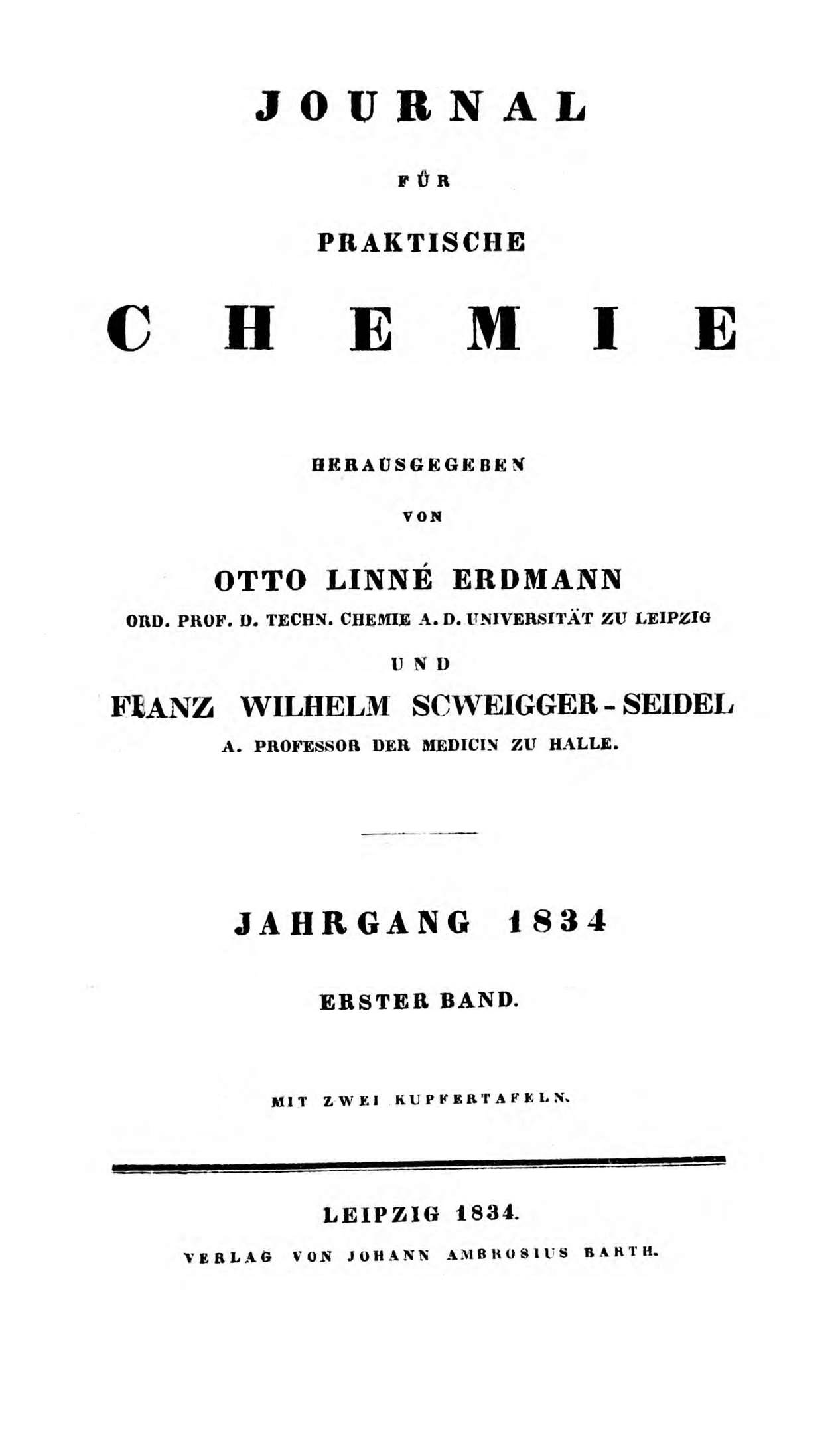
- Discipline: Chemistry
- Language: German (with some English articles after WW II)

Publication details
- History: 1834–2000 (vols. 1–342); preceded by Journal für technische und ökonomische Chemie (1828–1833)
- Publisher: Verlag von Johann Ambrosius Barth until 1942, Leipzig (Germany)
- Frequency: 8/year

Standard abbreviations
- ISO 4: J. Prakt. Chem.

Indexing
- CODEN: JPCHF4
- ISSN: 1521-3897
- LCCN: 99023032

Links
- Journal homepage

The Journal für praktische Chemie was a German-language scientific journal for chemistry. The journal was founded in 1828 by Otto Linné Erdmann (1804–1869) as the Journal für technische und ökonomische Chemie, the oldest chemical trade journal in Germany. From 1828 (under the original title) to 1869 Erdmann was the editor, along with Franz Wilhelm Schweigger-Seidel (from 1833 to 1838), Richard Felix Marchand (from 1839 to 1850), and Gustav Werther (from 1853 to 1869). From 1870 to 1884 Hermann Kolbe was the editor-in-chief. From 1879 to 1884 Ernst von Meyer worked as co-editor under Kolbe and became editor-in-chief upon Kolbe's death in 1884 and continued in that capacity until his own death in 1916. Beginning in 1917 the journal was edited by Julius Bredt, Theodor Curtius, Karl Elbs, Otto Fischer (1852–1932), Fritz Foerster, and Berthold Rassow with August Darapsky as editor-in-chief. Beginning in 1953 the Journal für praktische Chemie was published by the Chemische Gesellschaft der DDR.

In 1992 the Journal für praktische Chemie was merged with the Chemiker-Zeitung (which was founded in 1877). In 2001 the Journal für praktische Chemie was merged into the journal Advanced Synthesis & Catalysis published by Wiley-VCH Verlag in Weinheim.
