= Fluorosulfonyl isocyanate =

Names
- IUPAC name N-(oxomethylidene)sulfamoyl fluoride
- Other names Sulfuryl fluoride isocyanate, FSIC

Identifiers
CAS Number	1495-51-8
3D model (JSmol)	Interactive image
ChemSpider	13752955
ECHA InfoCard	100.412.521
EC Number	982-658-7
PubChem CID	12636793
UNII	XA3V3DN3T4
- InChI: InChI=1S/CFNO3S/c2-7(5,6)3-1-4 Key: RQIMPDXRFCFBGC-UHFFFAOYSA-N
- SMILES: C(=NS(=O)(=O)F)=O

Properties
Chemical formula	CFNO_{3}S
Molar mass	125.07 g·mol^{−1}
Appearance	Colorless volatile liquid

Hazards
- GHS labelling
Pictograms	(GHS07: Exclamation mark) (GHS08: Health hazard) (GHS05: Corrosive)
- Except where otherwise noted, data are given for materials in their standard state (at 25 °C [77 °F], 100 kPa). Infobox references

Fluorosulfonyl isocyanate is an organic chemical compound with the molecular formula FSO_{2}NCO.

== Synthesis ==
Fluorosulfonyl isocyanate can be made in a reaction of sulfonyl bisisocyanate and fluorosulfonic acid:

SO_{2}(NCO)_{2} + HSO_{3}F → FSO_{2}NCO + HSO_{3}NCO

It is also formed in an exchange of halogens in chlorosulfonyl isocyanate using sodium monofluoride:

ClSO_{2}NCO + NaF → FSO_{2}NCO + NaCl

== Physical properties ==
The compound forms a colorless, volatile liquid.

It is soluble in aprotic organic solvents.

== Uses ==
The compound is a highly reactive, versatile chemical used in synthesizing polymers, agrochemicals, and advanced materials, notably acting as a linker in click chemistry for drug discovery.

== See also ==
- Chlorosulfonyl isocyanate
- Fluorosulfonyl azide
- Trifluoromethanesulfonyl azide
