= Tosyl azide =

Chemical compound used in organic synthesis

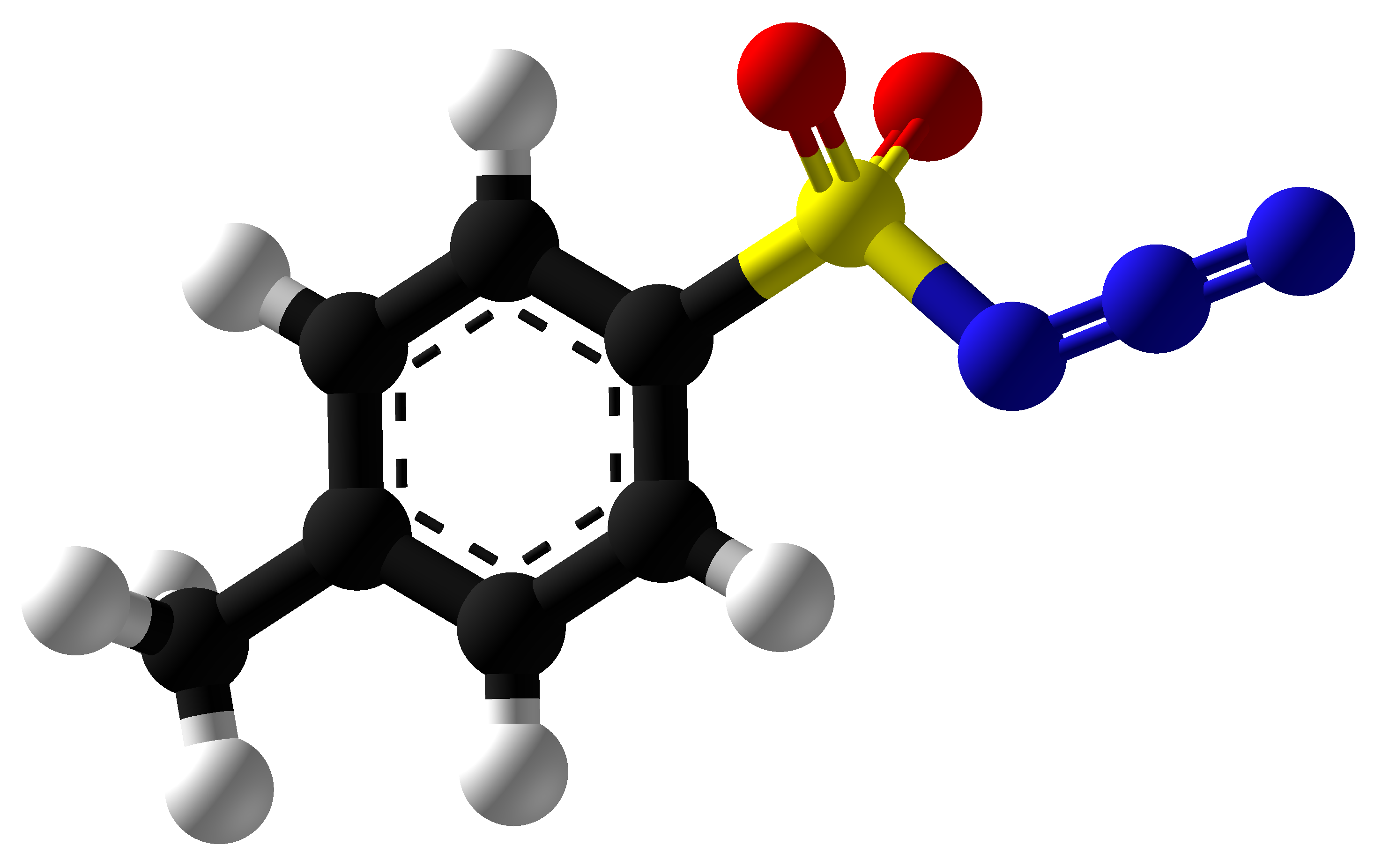

Names
- Preferred IUPAC name 4-Methylbenzene-1-sulfonyl azide
- Other names p-Toluenesulfonyl azide; p-Tosyl azide; p-Toluenesulfonazide; TsN_{3}

Identifiers
CAS Number	941-55-9
3D model (JSmol)	Interactive image
ChemSpider	13072
ECHA InfoCard	100.012.164
EC Number	213-381-5
PubChem CID	13661
UNII	97F7BLE97S
CompTox Dashboard (EPA)	DTXSID4061333
- InChI: InChI=1S/C7H7N3O2S/c1-6-2-4-7(5-3-6)13(11,12)10-9-8/h2-5H,1H3
- SMILES: O=S(=O)([N-][N+]#N)c1ccc(cc1)C

Properties
Chemical formula	C_{7}H_{7}N_{3}O_{2}S
Molar mass	197.22 g/mol
Appearance	Colorless to pale yellow oily liquid
Density	1.286 g/cm^{3}
Melting point	21 to 22 °C (70 to 72 °F; 294 to 295 K)
Boiling point	110 to 115 °C (230 to 239 °F; 383 to 388 K) at 0.001 mmHg
- Except where otherwise noted, data are given for materials in their standard state (at 25 °C [77 °F], 100 kPa). Infobox references

Tosyl azide (systematic name: 4-methylbenzenesulfonyl azide; abbreviation: TsN_{3}) is an organic compound with the formula CH_{3}C_{6}H_{4}SO_{2}N_{3}. It is a widely used reagent in organic synthesis, primarily valued for its ability to transfer diazo groups and generate reactive nitrene intermediates. Although it is one of the more stable sulfonyl azides, it is highly energetic, heat- and shock-sensitive, and presents significant explosive hazards, particularly when isolated in pure bulk form.

== Uses ==
Tosyl azide serves as a versatile building block in modern synthetic chemistry, with three primary applications.

=== Diazo transfer ===
The most prominent application of tosyl azide is as a diazo-transfer reagent. In the Regitz diazo transfer, tosyl azide reacts with active methylene compounds (such as β-keto esters, malonates, and 1,3-diketones) in the presence of a base (typically triethylamine or DBU) to yield α-diazo carbonyl compounds. These resulting α-diazo compounds are versatile intermediates used in cyclopropanation, X–H insertion reactions, and the synthesis of various heterocycles.

=== Nitrene transfer and C–H amination ===
Tosyl azide serves as a convenient precursor to the tosyl nitrene (TsN:), a highly reactive electrophilic species. Upon thermal or photochemical activation, or more commonly via transition metal catalysis (using complexes of rhodium, copper, ruthenium, cobalt, or iron), tosyl azide extrudes nitrogen gas to generate a metal-bound nitrene intermediate. This intermediate can undergo:

- Intramolecular and intermolecular C–H amination: Inserting the nitrene into unactivated carbon–hydrogen bonds to form amines or sulfonamides.
- Aziridination: Adding across the double bond of alkenes to form aziridine rings.

=== Click chemistry ===
In the context of click chemistry, tosyl azide participates in the copper-catalyzed azide-alkyne cycloaddition (CuAAC). It undergoes a [3+2] cycloaddition with terminal alkynes to construct N-sulfonyl-1,2,3-triazoles. These sulfonyl triazoles are valuable scaffolds in medicinal chemistry and materials science.

== Preparation ==
Tosyl azide is typically synthesized via the nucleophilic substitution reaction of tosyl chloride (p-toluenesulfonyl chloride) with sodium azide. The reaction is commonly carried out in a biphasic mixture of acetone and water, sometimes utilizing phase-transfer catalysts or simple stirring at room temperature.

Due to its explosive nature, commercial suppliers often provide tosyl azide as a dilute solution in toluene or other solvents rather than as a neat liquid. In recent years, to mitigate the risks associated with batch processing, chemists have developed continuous flow chemistry protocols where tosyl azide is generated in situ and immediately consumed in subsequent reactions (such as diazo transfer or triazole synthesis) without ever being isolated or accumulated in large quantities.

== Safety and hazards ==
Despite being considered one of the more stable sulfonyl azides compared to its aliphatic counterparts, tosyl azide is highly energetic and is classified as a potential explosive.

Differential scanning calorimetry (DSC) and thermal hazard assessments reveal that tosyl azide undergoes a highly exothermic decomposition, releasing nitrogen gas. The onset of this explosive decomposition typically occurs around 120 °C, but localized heating, friction, or mechanical shock can trigger premature detonation. Hazard assessments using Yoshida's predictive correlations have flagged tosyl azide as having severe impact sensitivity.

Consequently, strict safety protocols are mandatory when handling tosyl azide. It should never be heated above 100 °C, and it should be stored in small quantities at low temperatures, preferably kept in solution. For scale-up and industrial applications, continuous flow reactors or in situ generation methods are strongly preferred over traditional batch chemistry to minimize the inventory of the explosive reagent at any given time.

== See also ==
- Fluorosulfonyl azide
- Diphenylphosphoryl azide
- Trifluoromethanesulfonyl azide
- Diazo compound
- Regitz diazo transfer
