= Organic azide =

Organic compounds containing the azide (N3) functional group

The azide functional group can be shown by two resonance structures.

An organic azide is an organic compound that contains an azide (–N_{3}) functional group. Because of the hazards associated with their use, few azides are used commercially although they exhibit interesting reactivity for researchers. Low molecular weight azides are considered especially hazardous and are avoided. In the research laboratory, azides are precursors to amines. They are also popular for their participation in the "click reaction" between an azide and an alkyne and in Staudinger ligation. These two reactions are generally quite reliable, lending themselves to combinatorial chemistry.

== History ==
Phenyl azide ("diazoamidobenzol"), was prepared in 1864 by Peter Griess by the reaction of ammonia and phenyldiazonium. In the 1890s, Theodor Curtius, who had discovered hydrazoic acid (HN_{3}), described the rearrangement of acyl azides to isocyanates subsequently named the Curtius rearrangement. Rolf Huisgen described the eponymous 1,3-dipolar cycloaddition.

The interest in azides among organic chemists has been relatively modest due to the reported instability of these compounds. The situation has changed dramatically with the discovery by Sharpless et al. of Cu-catalysed (3+2)-cycloadditions between organic azides and terminal alkynes. The azido- and the alkyne groups are "bioorthogonal", which means they do not interact with living systems, and at the same time they undergo an impressively fast and selective coupling. This type of formal 1,3-dipolar cycloaddition became the most famous example of so-called "click chemistry" and the field of organic azides exploded.

== Preparation ==
Selected bond distances (picometers) and angles for phenyl azide.

Myriad methods exist, most often using preformed azide-containing reagent.

Azide synthesis techniques. Arrows represent retrosynthetic steps.

=== Alkyl azides ===
==== By halide displacement ====
As a pseudohalide, azide generally displaces many leaving group, e.g. Br^{−}, I^{−}, TsO^{−}, sulfonate, and others to give the azido compound. The azide source is most often sodium azide (NaN_{3}), although lithium azide (LiN_{3}) has been demonstrated.

==== From alcohols ====
Aliphatic alcohols give azides via a variant of the Mitsunobu reaction, with the use of hydrazoic acid. Hydrazines may also form azides by reaction with sodium nitrite: Alcohols can be converted into azides in one step using 2-azido-1,3-dimethylimidazolinium hexafluorophosphate (ADMP) or under Mitsunobu conditions with diphenylphosphoryl azide (DPPA).

==== From epoxides and aziridines ====
Trimethylsilyl azide (CH_{3})_{3}SiN_{3}, and tributyltin azide (CH_{3}CH_{2}CH_{2}CH_{2})_{3}SnN_{3}, have all been used, including enantioselective modifications of the reaction are also known. Aminoazides are accessible by the epoxide and aziridine ring cleavage, respectively.

==== From amines ====
The azo transfer compounds, trifluoromethanesulfonyl azide and imidazole-1-sulfonyl azide, react with amines to give the corresponding azides. Diazo transfer onto amines using trifluoromethanesulfonyl azide (TfN_{3}) and Tosyl azide (TsN_{3}) has been reported.

==== Hydroazidation ====
Hydroazidation of alkenes has been demonstrated

=== Aryl azides ===
Aryl azides may be prepared by displacement of the appropriate diazonium salt with sodium azide or trimethylsilyl azide. Nucleophilic aromatic substitution is also possible, even with chlorides. Anilines and aromatic hydrazines undergo diazotization, as do alkyl amines and hydrazines.

PhNHNH_{2} + NaNO_{2} → PhN_{3} + NaOH + H_{2}O

=== Acyl azides ===
Alkyl or aryl acyl chlorides react with sodium azide in aqueous solution to give acyl azides, which give isocyanates in the Curtius rearrangement.

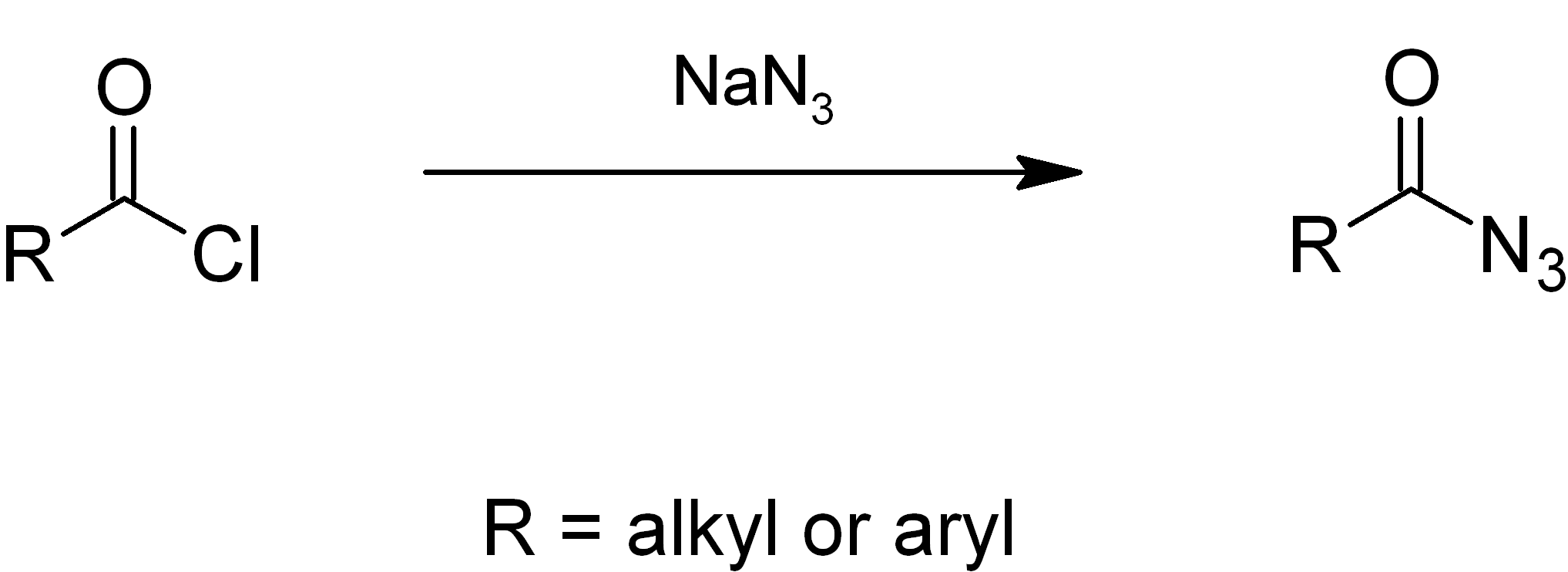

==== Dutt–Wormall reaction ====
A classic method for the synthesis of azides is the Dutt–Wormall reaction in which a diazonium salt reacts with a sulfonamide first to a diazoaminosulfinate and then on hydrolysis the azide and a sulfinic acid.

== Reactions ==
Organic azides engage in useful organic reactions. The terminal nitrogen is mildly nucleophilic. Generally, nucleophiles attack the azide at the terminal nitrogen N_{γ}, while electrophiles react at the internal atom N_{α}. Azides easily extrude diatomic nitrogen, a tendency that is exploited in many reactions such as the Staudinger ligation or the Curtius rearrangement.

Azides may be reduced to amines by hydrogenolysis or with a phosphine (e.g., triphenylphosphine) in the Staudinger reaction. This reaction allows azides to serve as protected -NH_{2} synthons, as illustrated by the synthesis of 1,1,1-tris(aminomethyl)ethane:

3 H_{2} + CH_{3}C(CH_{2}N_{3})_{3} → CH_{3}C(CH_{2}NH_{2})_{3} + 3 N_{2}

In the azide alkyne Huisgen cycloaddition, organic azides react as 1,3-dipoles, reacting with alkynes to give substituted 1,2,3-triazoles.

Some azide reactions are shown in the following scheme. Probably the most famous is the reaction with phosphines, which leads to iminophosphoranes 22; these can be hydrolysed into primary amines 23 (the Staudinger reaction), react with carbonyl compounds to give imines 24 (the aza-Wittig reaction), or undergo other transformations. Thermal decomposition of azides gives nitrenes, which participate in a variety of reactions; vinyl azides 19 decompose into 2H-azirines 20. Alkyl azides with low nitrogen-content ((nC + nO) / nN ≥ 3) are relatively stable and decompose only above ca. 175 °C.

Direct photochemical decomposition of alkyl azides leads almost exclusively to imines (e.g. 25 and 26). It is proposed that the azide group is promoted to the singlet excited state and then undergoes concerted rearrangement without the intermediacy of nitrenes. The presence of triplet sensitisers, however, may change the reaction mechanism and result in the formation of triplet nitrenes. The latter were observed directly by ESR spectroscopy at −269 °C as well as inferred in some photolyses. Triplet methyl nitrene is 31 kJ/mol more stable than its singlet form, and thus is most likely the ground state.

The (3+2)-cycloaddition of azides to double or triple bonds is one of the most utilised cycloadditions in organic chemistry and affords triazolines (e.g. 17) or triazoles, respectively. The uncatalysed reaction is a concerted pericyclic process, in which the configuration of the alkene component is transferred to the triazoline product. The Woodward–Hoffmann denomination is [π4s+π2s] and the reaction is symmetry-allowed. According to Sustmann, this is a Type II cycloaddition, which means the two HOMOs and the two LUMOs have comparable energies, and thus both electron-withdrawing and electron-donating substituents may lead to an increase in the reaction rate. The reaction is generally free from significant solvent effects because both the reactants and the transition state (TS) are non-polar.

Another azide regular is tosyl azide here in reaction with norbornadiene in a nitrogen insertion reaction:

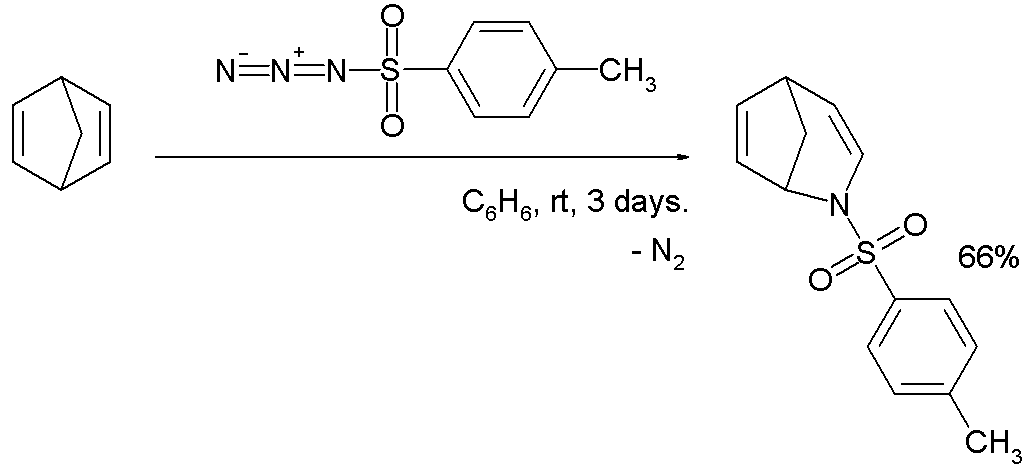

== Applications ==
Some azides are valuable as bioorthogonal chemical reporters, molecules that can be "clicked" to see the metabolic path it has taken inside a living system.

The antiviral drug zidovudine (AZT) contains an azido group.

== Additional sources ==
- Patai, Saul, ed. (1971-01-01). The Azido Group (1971). PATai's Chemistry of Functional Groups. Chichester, UK: John Wiley & Sons, Ltd. p. 626. doi:10.1002/9780470771266. ISBN 978-0-470-77126-6.
- Scriven, Eric F. Azides and Nitrenes: Reactivity and Utility. Academic Press. p. 542. ISBN 9780124143074.
- Padwa, Albert; Pearson, William H., eds. (2002-04-05). Synthetic Applications of 1,3-Dipolar Cycloaddition Chemistry Toward Heterocycles and Natural Products: Padwa/Dipolar Cycloaddition E-Bk. Chemistry of Heterocyclic Compounds: A Series Of Monographs. Vol. 59. New York, USA: John Wiley & Sons, Inc. doi:10.1002/0471221902. ISBN 978-0-471-38726-8.
- Wolff, H. Org. React. 1946, 3, 337–349.
- Boyer, J. H.; Canter, F. C. (1954-02-01). "Alkyl and Aryl Azides". Chemical Reviews. 54 (1): 1–57. doi:10.1021/cr60167a001. ISSN 0009-2665n.
- Scriven, Eric F. V.; Turnbull, Kenneth (March 1988). "Azides: Their Preparation and synthetic uses". Chemical Reviews. 88 (2): 297–368. doi:10.1021/cr00084a001. ISSN 0009-2665.
- Bräse, Stefan; Gil, Carmen; Knepper, Kerstin; Zimmermann, Viktor (2005-08-19). "Organic Azides: An Exploding Diversity of a Unique Class of Compounds". Angewandte Chemie International Edition. 44 (33): 5188–5240. doi:10.1002/anie.200400657. ISSN 1433-7851. PMID 16100733.
- Schmidt, Eckart W. (2022). "Organic Azido Compounds". Azides and Azido Compounds. Encyclopedia of Liquid Fuels. De Gruyter. pp. 901–952. doi:10.1515/9783110750287-011. ISBN 978-3-11-075028-7.
