= Chemiker Zeitung =

- Discipline: Chemistry
- Language: German

Publication details
- History: 1878–1998

Standard abbreviations
- ISO 4: Chem. Ztg.

Indexing
- ISSN: 1615-4150 (print); 1615-4169 (web)

Chemiker Zeitung was a German scientific journal with publications on general and industrial chemistry. It was established in 1877, and it issued in Köthen. From 1932 onwards, it was named Forschrittsbericht der Chemiker-Zeitung über die wichtigsten Gebiete der Chemie und chemischen Industrie and in 1950 the name changed to Deutsche Chemiker-Zeitschrift. Publication was suspended between 1945 and 1949. The journal was continued from 1959 to 1968 as the Chemiker-Zeitung, Chemische Apparatur. In 1992, Chemiker Zeitung was merged with Journal für praktische Chemie (established in 1834). Since 2001, Advanced Synthesis & Catalysis (publisher: Wiley-VCH, Weinheim, Germany) integrated both Chemiker Zeitung and Journal für praktische Chemie.

== See also ==
- Science and technology in Germany
