= DPPA =

DPPA may refer to:

- Diphenylphosphoryl azide
- Driver's Privacy Protection Act, a 1994 federal U.S. law concerning privacy of DMV information
- United Nations Department of Political and Peacebuilding Affairs, a department of the United Nations Secretariat
