= N3− =

N3− may refer to:

- N^{−}_{3}, an azide anion in chemistry
- N^{3−}, a nitride anion in chemistry
- N_{3}- an organic azide group
