= Karl Gottfried Erdmann =

German botanist and physician (1774–1835)

Karl Gottfried Erdmann (31 March 1774 – 13 January 1835) was a German medical doctor and botanist. He was the father of chemist Otto Linné Erdmann (1804–1869).

Erdmann was born in Wittenberg (which would be part of the Electorate of Saxony until 1806). In 1798 he received his medical doctorate from the University of Wittenberg with the dissertation "De nexu theoriam et praxin medicam intercedente". In 1799 he became a licensed physician in Dresden, and up until 1824 he held the position of sanitation assessor. He is credited for introducing vaccinations for smallpox in Dresden in 1801. He died in Dresden, aged 60.

== Selected works ==
- Sammlung und Beschreibung von Giftpflanzen, die in Sachsen wild wachsen, 1797 (= exsiccata) – Collection and description of poisonous plants growing wild in Saxony.
- Merkwürdige Gewächse der obersächsischen Flora nebst Bemerkungen über ihren Nutzen in der Oekonomie, Technologie und Arzneikunde, 1797-1801 (= exsiccata)
- Gewächse der Obersächsischen Flora, 1800 – On flora of Upper Saxony.
- Übersicht der theoretischen und practischen Botanik nach ihrem ganzen Umfange, 1802 – Tabular overview of theoretical and practical botany.
- Aufsätze und Beobachtungen aus allen Theilen der Arzneiwissenschaft, 1802 – Essays and observations from all parts of medical science.
