= Imidazole-1-sulfonyl azide =

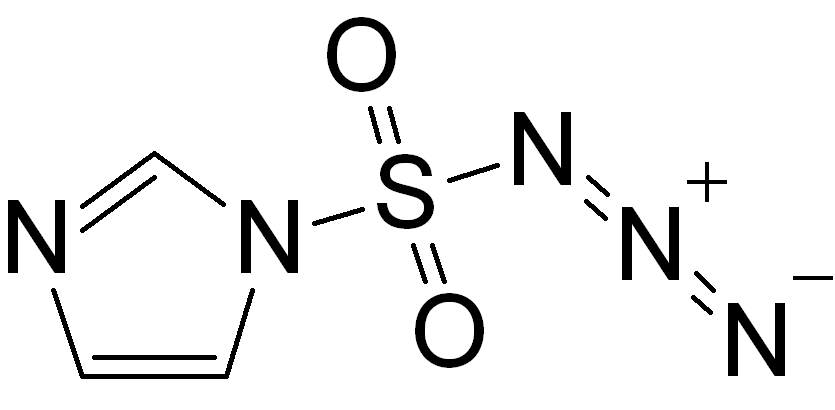

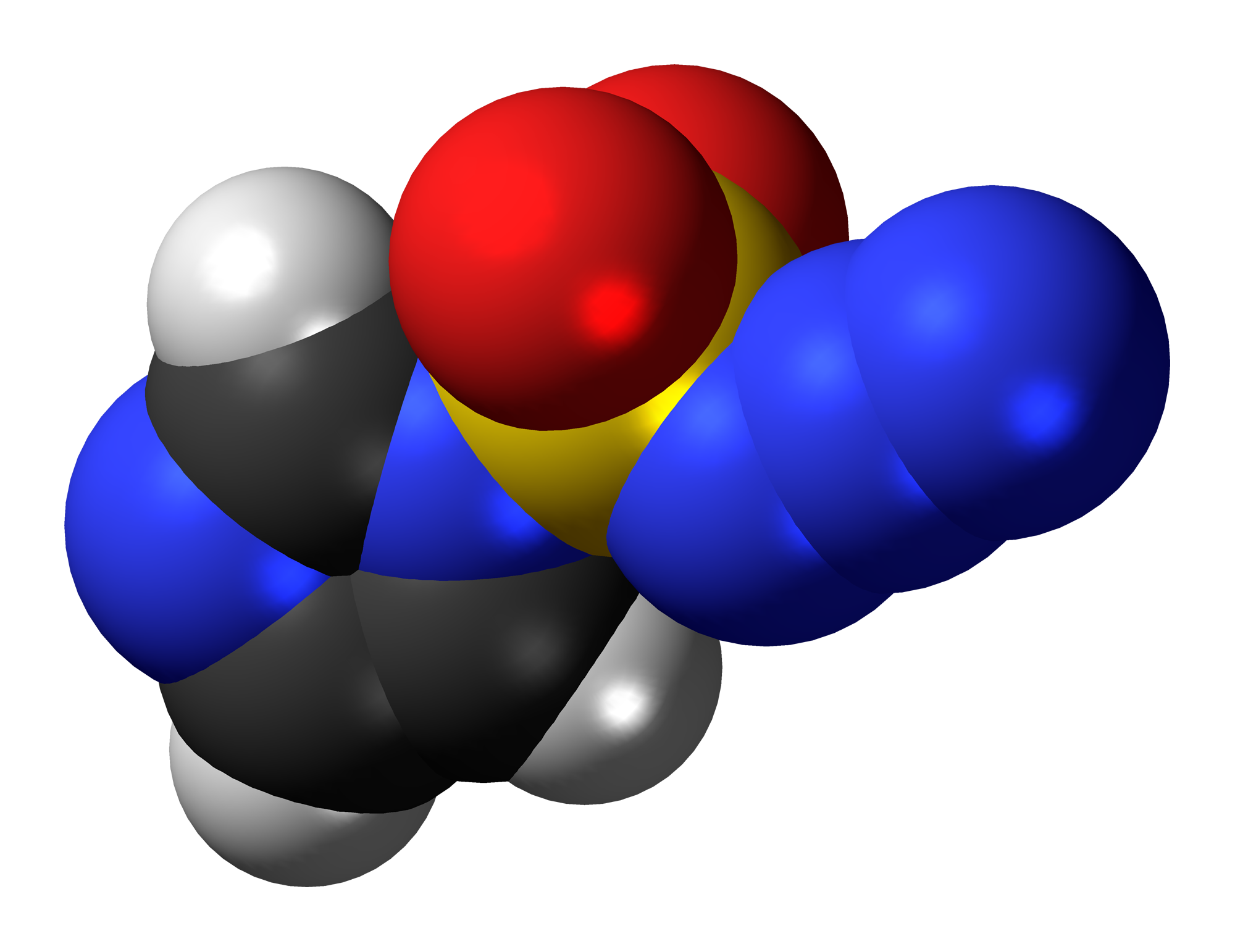

Names
- Preferred IUPAC name 1H-Imidazole-1-sulfonyl azide

Identifiers
CAS Number	952234-37-6
3D model (JSmol)	Interactive image
ChemSpider	21374920
PubChem CID	23583981
UNII	TX8AMS4Q3J
CompTox Dashboard (EPA)	DTXSID70635065
- InChI: InChI=1S/C3H3N5O2S.ClH/c4-6-7-11(9,10)8-2-1-5-3-8;/h1-3H;1H Key: XYURSCOGYWBRDR-UHFFFAOYSA-N; InChI=1/C3H3N5O2S.ClH/c4-6-7-11(9,10)8-2-1-5-3-8;/h1-3H;1H Key: XYURSCOGYWBRDR-UHFFFAOYAJ
- SMILES: Cl.O=S(=O)(N=[N+]=[N-])n1ccnc1

Properties
Chemical formula	C_{3}H_{3}N_{5}O_{2}S
Molar mass	173.15 g·mol^{−1}
Appearance	Colourless Liquid

Hazards
- Occupational safety and health (OHS/OSH)
Main hazards	Potentially explosive, Harmful
- Except where otherwise noted, data are given for materials in their standard state (at 25 °C [77 °F], 100 kPa). verify (what is ?) Infobox references

Imidazole-1-sulfonyl azide is an organic azide compound that can be used as an alternative organic synthesis reagent to trifluoromethanesulfonyl azide. It is an explosive colorless liquid, but some of its organic-soluble salts can be safely handled and stored as a solid.

== Preparation ==
The hydrochloride salt of this compound is also available commercially, but can degrade to release explosive byproducts.

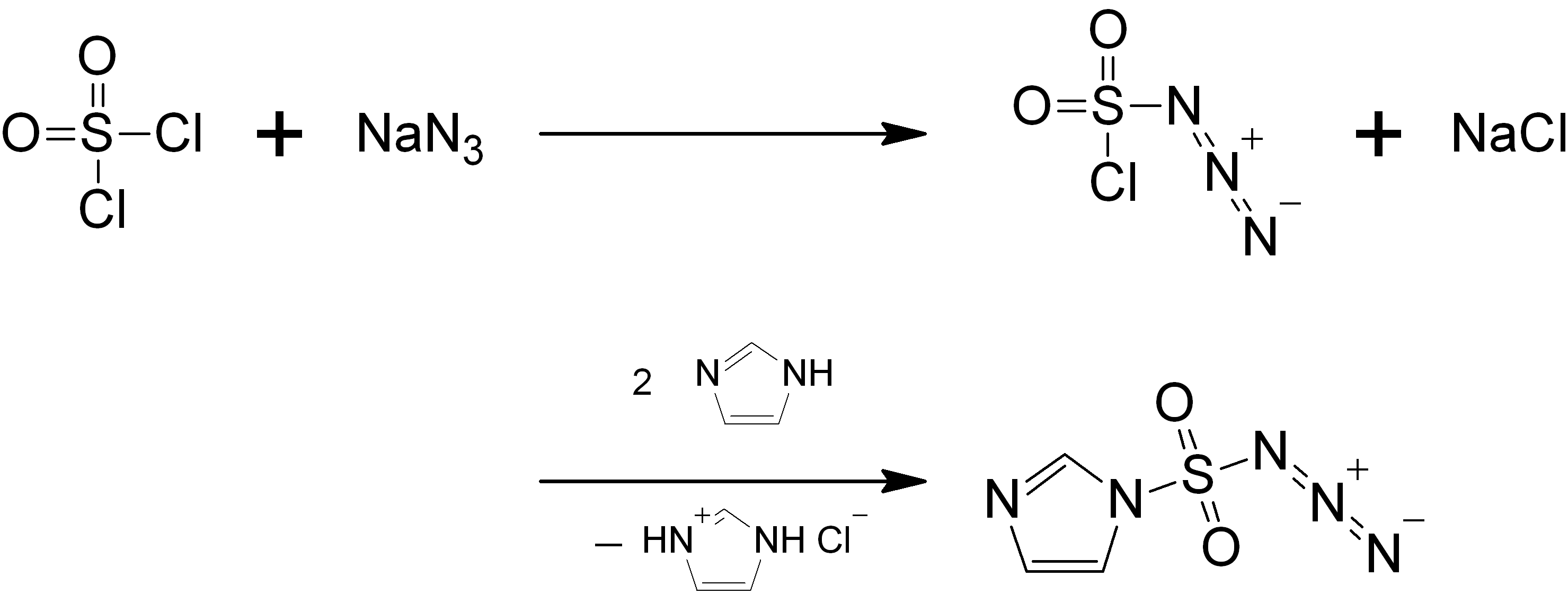

== Reactions ==
Like trifluoromethanesulfonyl azide, this compound generally converts primary amines or ammonium salts to azides when catalyzed by copper(II), nickel(II), zinc(II), and cobalt(II) salts. This reaction is effectively the reverse of the Staudinger reaction. Similarly, it is able to transfer the diazo group (=N_{2}) under basic conditions.

== Safety ==
As with all organic azides, this compound is potentially explosive both in use and in preparation. The hydrochloride salt was initially reported to be insensitive to impact, vigorous grinding, and prolonged heating at 80 °C, although heating above 150 °C resulted in violent decomposition. Further reported impact studies indicated otherwise, showing the sensitivity to be similar to RDX. Subsequent reports noted that the hydrochloride salt is hygroscopic, and upon prolonged storage was hydrolyzed to produce hydrazoic acid, which made the material sensitive. Synthesis of the HCl salt has led to a significant explosion, with expected explosive byproducts of sulfonyl diazide or hydrazoic acid being present.

Recent studies have shown the hydrogen sulfate salt to be significantly less hazardous to handle with decomposition temperature of 131 °C, insensitivity to impact, and low electrostatic discharge and friction sensitivities. Further improvements have led to its synthesis with increased safety, making the hydrogen sulfate salt a relatively safe diazo-transfer reagent to both synthesize and handle.
