= Otto Linné Erdmann =

German chemist (1804–1869)

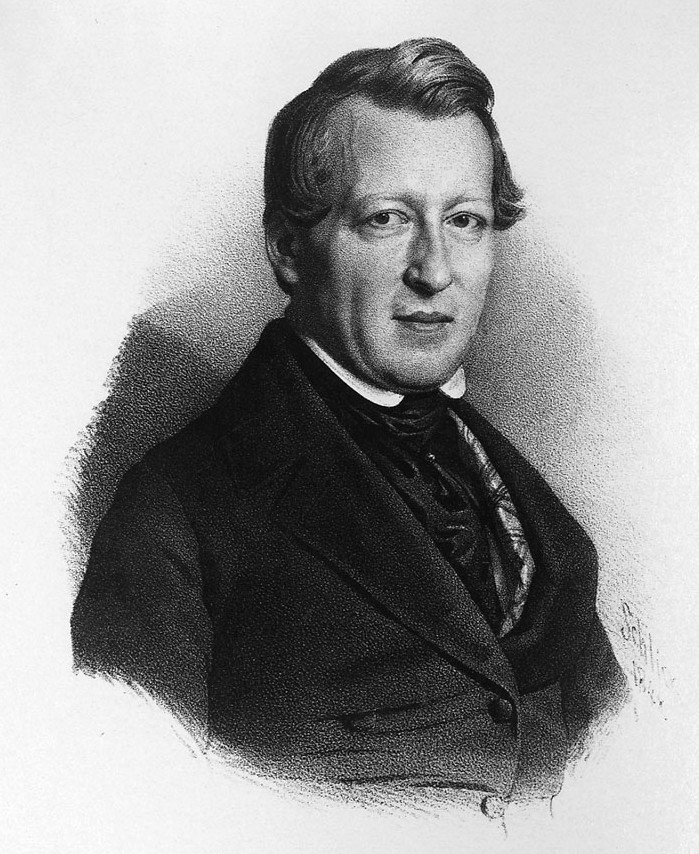
- Otto Linné Erdmann
- Born: 11 April 1804; Dresden, Electorate of Saxony, Holy Roman Empire
- Died: 9 October 1869 (aged 65); Leipzig, Kingdom of Saxony, North German Confederation

Otto Linné Erdmann (11 April 1804 – 9 October 1869) was a German chemist. He was the son of Karl Gottfried Erdmann, the medical doctor who introduced vaccination into Saxony.

Erdmann was born in Dresden on 11 April 1804. In 1820, he began to attend the medico-chirurgical academy of his native place. In 1822, he entered the University of Leipzig, where in 1827 he became an associate professor, and in 1830 a full professor of chemistry. This office he held until his death, which happened at Leipzig on 9 October 1869.

He was particularly successful as a teacher, and the laboratory established at Leipzig under his direction in 1843 was long regarded as a model institution. As an investigator he is best known for his work on nickel and indigo and other dye-stuffs. With R. F. Marchand (1813–1850) he also carried out a number of determinations of atomic weights.

In 1828, he founded the Journal für technische und ökonomische Chemie, which became in 1834 the Journal für praktische Chemie. From 1853 A. F. G. Werther (1815–1869) was an editor of the journal. Erdmann was also the author of Über das Nickel (1827), Lehrbuch der Chemie (1828), Grundriss der Waarenkunde (1833), and Über das Studium der Chemie (1861).
