= Acyl azide =

Carboxylic acid derivative

General chemical structure of an acyl azide

Acyl azides are carboxylic acid derivatives with the general formula RCON_{3}. These compounds, which are a subclass of organic azides, are generally colorless.

== Preparation ==
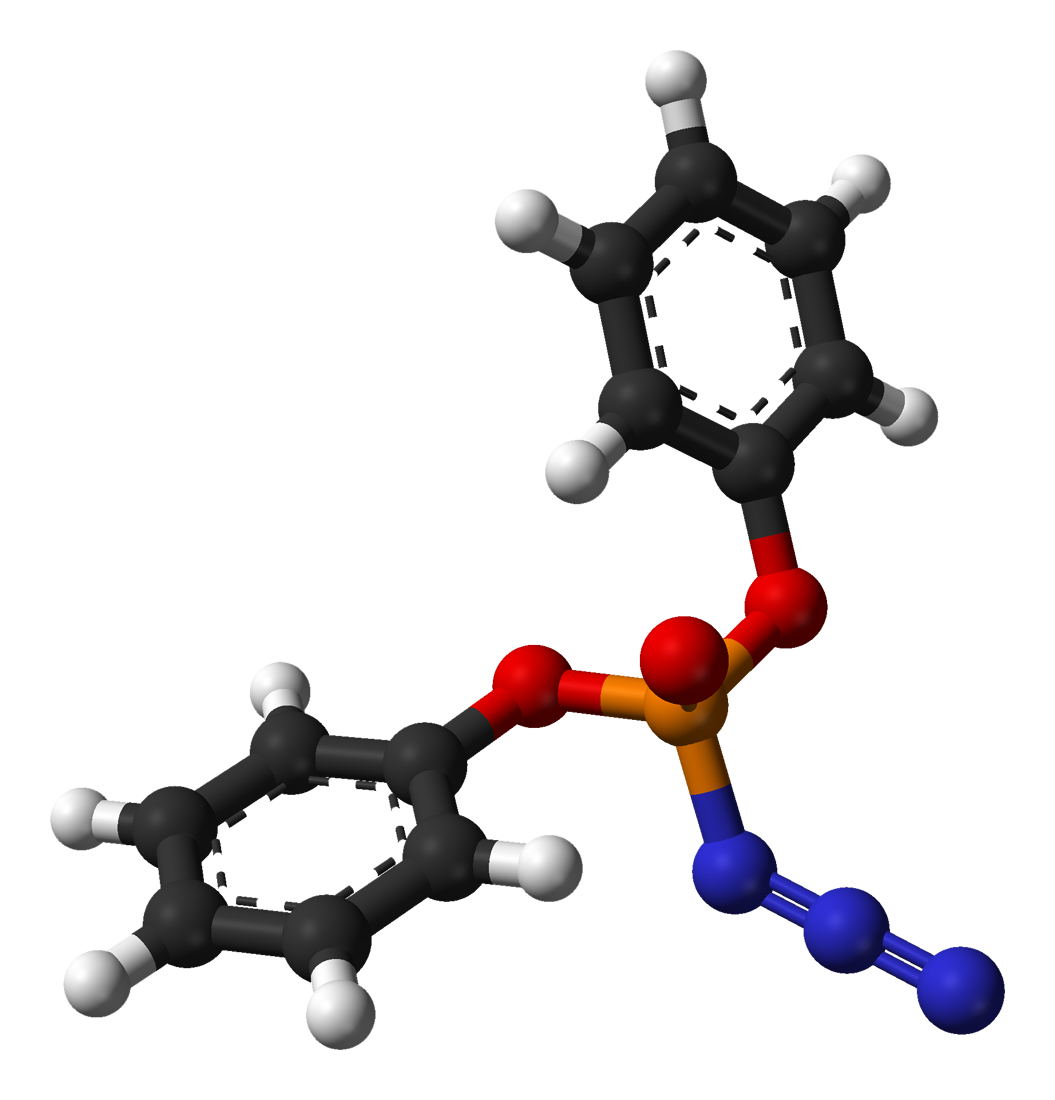
Diphenylphosphoryl azide

Typically acyl azides are generated under conditions where they rearrange to the isocyanate.

Acid chlorides and anhydrides react with sodium azide or trimethylsilyl azide to give acyl azides:

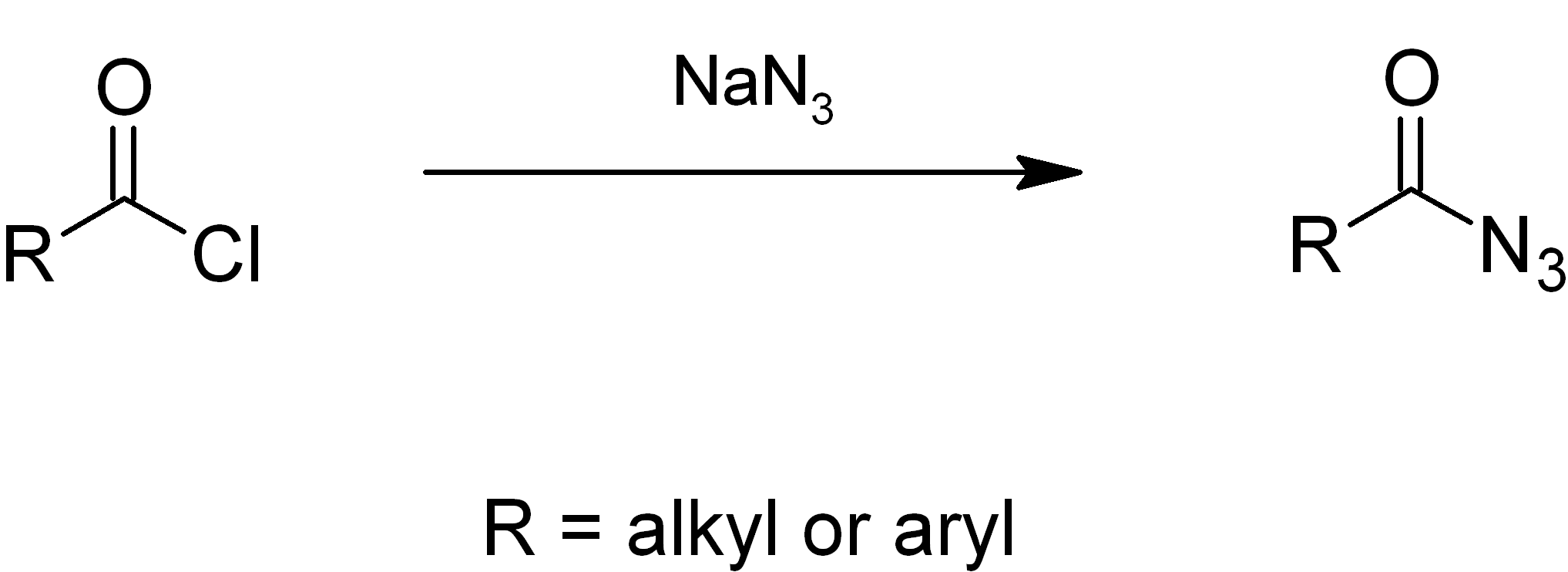

In a Mitsunobu variant, triphenylphosphine and trichloroacetonitrile catalyze excellent yields from various carboxylic acids and sodium azide at mild conditions.

The second major route to azides is from treating acylhydrazines with nitrous acid. Alternatively, the acyl azide can be formed by the direct reaction of a carboxylic acid with diphenylphosphoryl azide (DPPA).

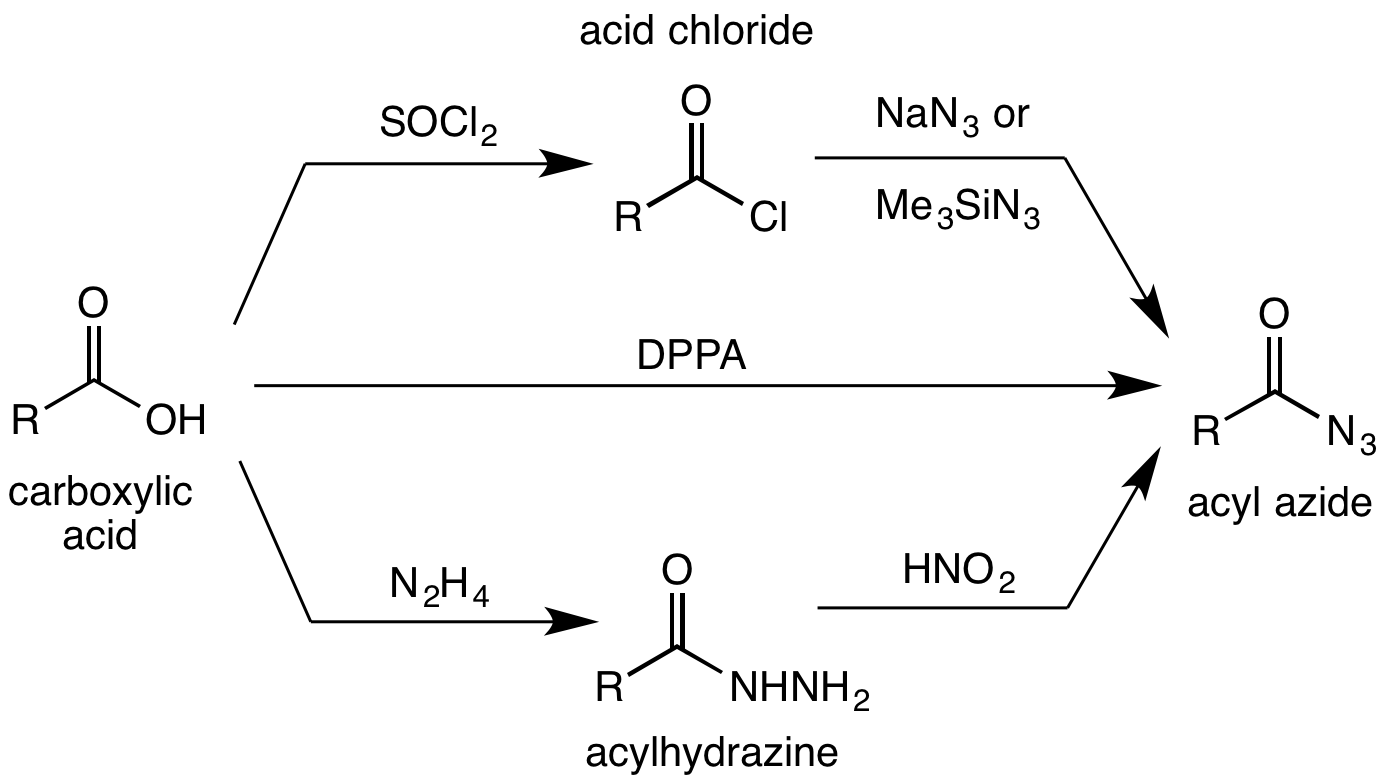
Methods of forming acyl azides from carboxylic acids

Another route oxidizes aldehydes with iodine azide, formed from sodium azide and iodine monochloride in acetonitrile.

== Uses ==
On Curtius rearrangement, acyl azides yield isocyanates.

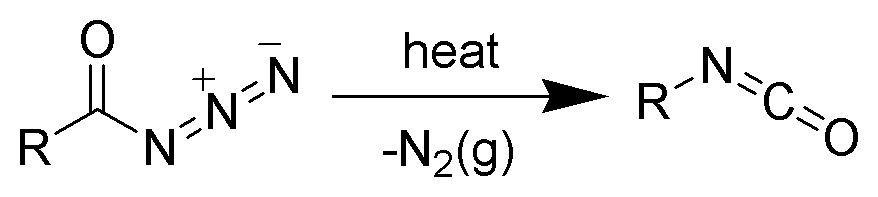

Acyl azides are also formed in Darapsky degradation,

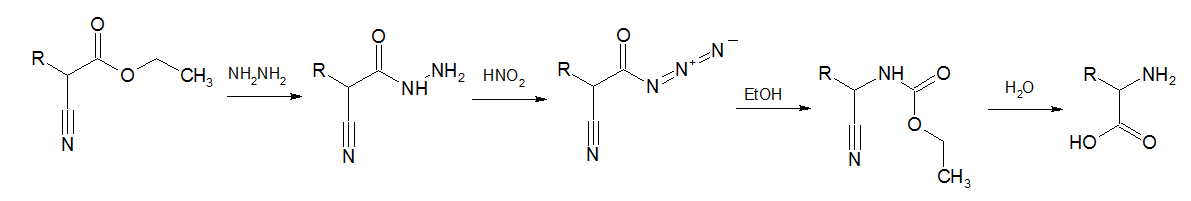

Acyl azides react with amines to give aminimides (R_{3}N^{+}N^{−}C(=O)R′).

== Historical references ==
- Curtius, Th. (1890). "Ueber Stickstoffwasserstoffsäure (Azoimid) N_{3}H". Ber. (in German). 23 (2): 3023–3033. doi:10.1002/cber.189002302232.
- Curtius, Th. (1894). "20. Hydrazide und Azide organischer Säuren I. Abhandlung". J. Prakt. Chem. (in German). 50 (1): 275–294. doi:10.1002/prac.18940500125.
- Darapsky, August (1936). "Darstellung von α-Aminosäuren aus Alkyl-cyanessigsäuren". J. Prakt. Chem. (in German). 146 (8–12): 250–267. doi:10.1002/prac.19361460806.
- Darapsky, August; Hillers, Dietrich (1915). "Über das Hydrazid der Cyanessigsäure, Isonitrosocyanessigsäure und Nitrocyanessigsäure". J. Prakt. Chem. (in German). 92 (1): 297–341. doi:10.1002/prac.19150920117. hdl:2027/uc1.b2654464.
