= Phenyl azide =

- Structural formula

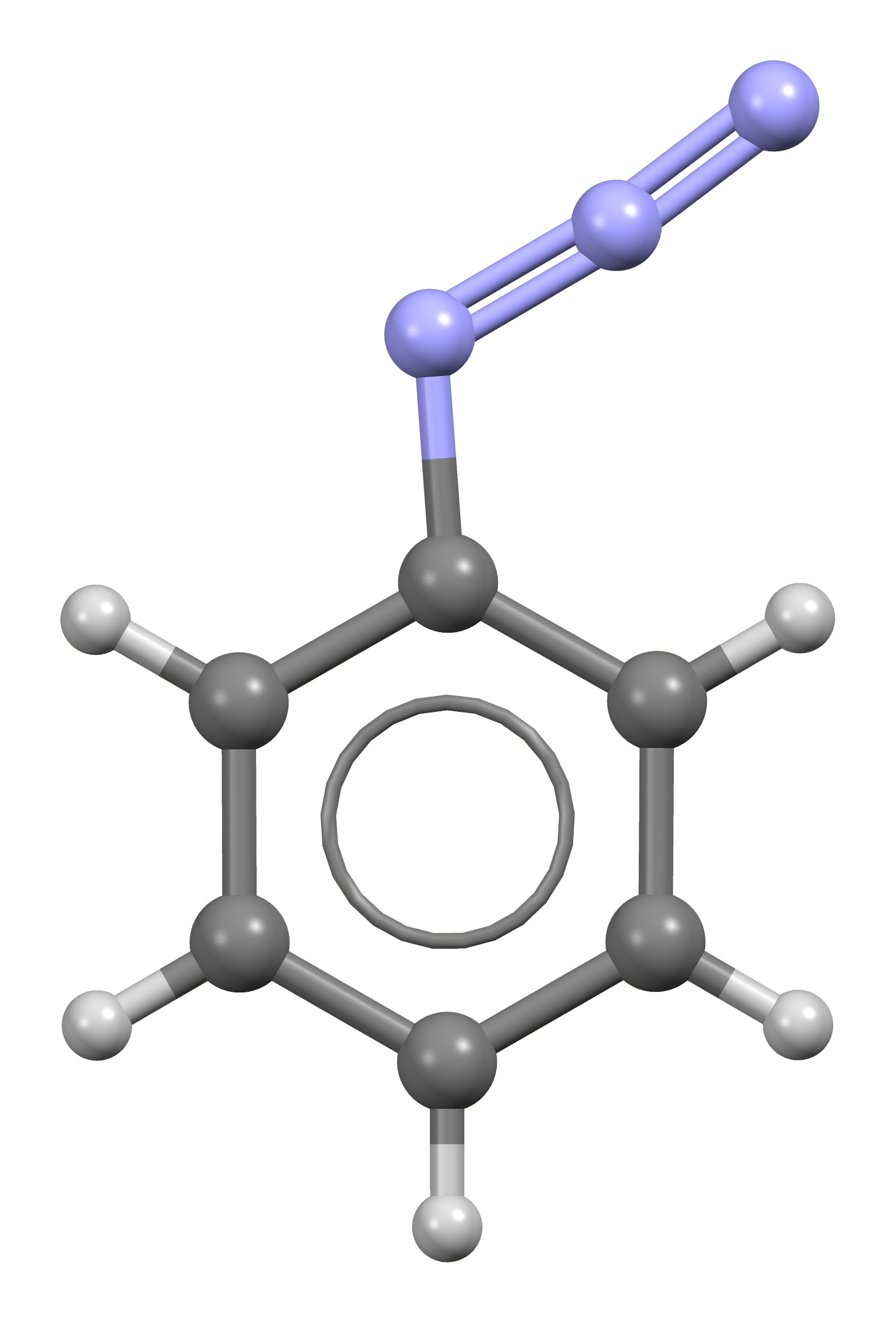
Ball-and-stick model
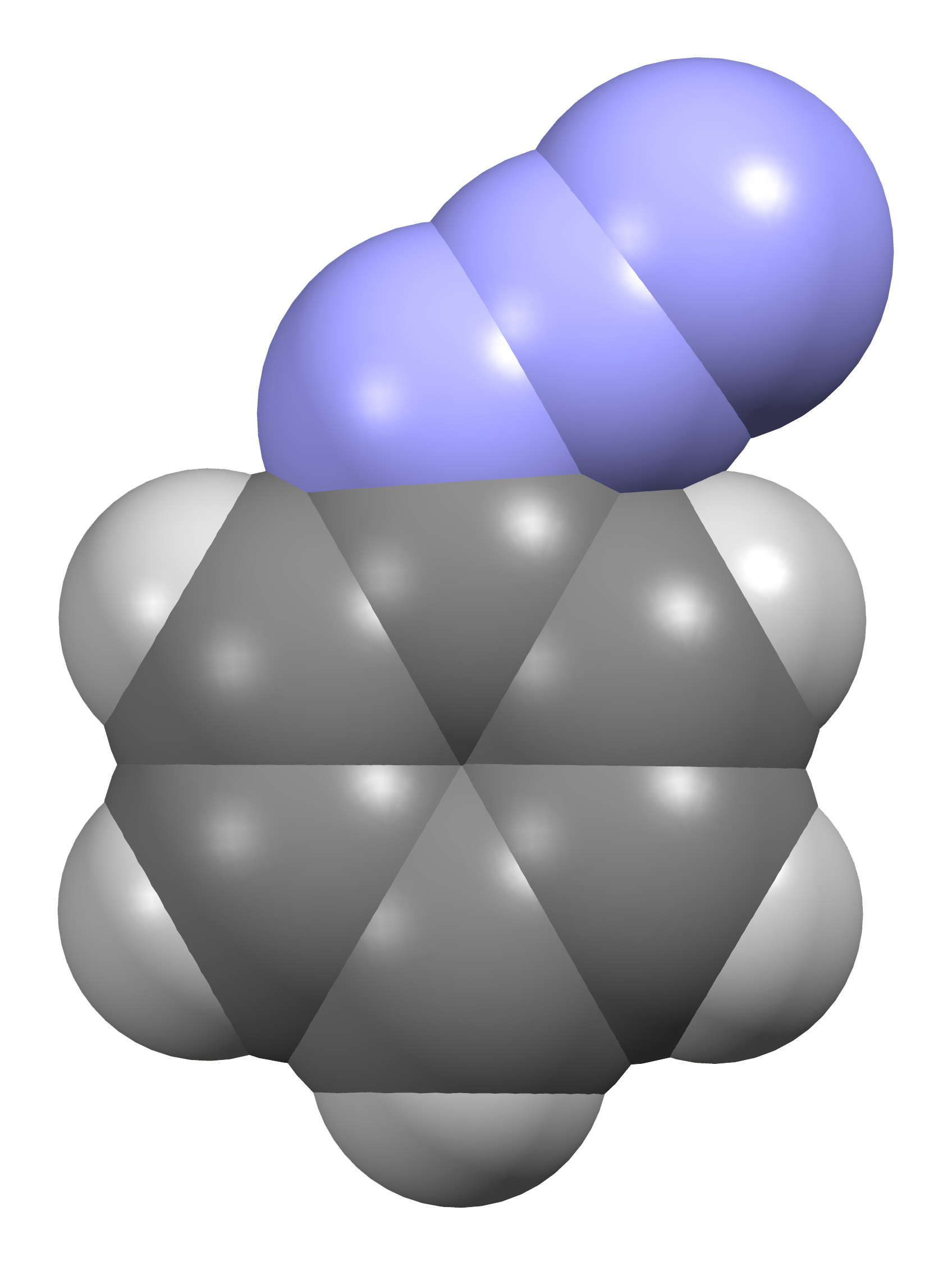
Space-filling model

Names
- Preferred IUPAC name Azidobenzene
- Other names Phenyl azide

Identifiers
CAS Number	622-37-7
3D model (JSmol)	Interactive image
ChemSpider	62529
ECHA InfoCard	100.009.756
EC Number	210-730-3
MeSH	C014747
PubChem CID	69319
UNII	2G0EH7N6YB
CompTox Dashboard (EPA)	DTXSID30878870
- InChI: InChI=1S/C6H5N3/c7-9-8-6-4-2-1-3-5-6/h1-5H Key: CTRLRINCMYICJO-UHFFFAOYSA-N; InChI=1/C6H5N3/c7-9-8-6-4-2-1-3-5-6/h1-5H Key: CTRLRINCMYICJO-UHFFFAOYAH
- SMILES: [N-]=[N+]=NC1=CC=CC=C1

Properties
Chemical formula	C_{6}H_{5}N_{3}
Molar mass	119.127 g·mol^{−1}
Appearance	Pale yellow, oily liquid
Boiling point	49 to 50 °C (120 to 122 °F; 322 to 323 K) at 5 mmHg
Solubility in water	not appreciable

Hazards
- Occupational safety and health (OHS/OSH)
Main hazards	explosive

Related compounds
Related compounds	Aniline; Nitrobenzene; Nitrosobenzene; Phenylhydrazine; Phenylhydroxylamine; Diazonium cation
- Except where otherwise noted, data are given for materials in their standard state (at 25 °C [77 °F], 100 kPa). verify (what is ?) Infobox references

Phenyl azide is an organic compound with the formula C_{6}H_{5}N_{3}. It is one of the prototypical organic azides. It is a pale yellow oily liquid with a pungent odor. The structure consists of a linear azide substituent bound to a phenyl group. The C−N=N angle is approximately 116°. It was discovered in 1864 by Peter Griess by the reaction of ammonia and phenyldiazonium.

== Preparation ==
Phenyl azide is prepared by the diazotization of phenylhydrazine with nitrous acid:

C_{6}H_{5}NHNH_{2} + HNO_{2} → C_{6}H_{5}N_{3} + 2 H_{2}O

Aryl iodides bearing electron-withdrawing substituents undergo metathesis with sodium azide in the presence of Cu(I), sodium ascorbate, and N,N'-dimethylethane-1,2-diamine (DMEDA):

RC_{6}H_{4}I + NaN_{3} → RC_{6}H_{4}N_{3} + NaI

It can also be prepared by condensation of benzenediazonium salt with toluenesulfonamide, followed by hydrolysis.

== Chemical reactions ==
Phenyl azide cycloadds to alkenes and especially alkynes, particularly those bearing electronegative substituents. In a classic example of click chemistry, phenyl azide and phenylacetylene react to give diphenyl triazole.

Phenyl azide reacts with triphenylphosphine to give the Staudinger reagent triphenylphosphine phenylimide (C_{6}H_{5}NP(C_{6}H_{5})_{3}).

Thermolysis induces loss of N_{2} to give the highly reactive phenylnitrene C_{6}H_{5}N.

== Safety ==
As with many other azides, phenyl azide poses a risk of explosion, so a protective blast shield is recommended during purification and handling. Distillations are hazardous. Organic Syntheses recommends a vacuum of 5mm Hg to give a boiling point of "66–68 °C/21 mm. with a bath temperature of 70–75 °C." The pure substance may be stored in the dark, cold, and even then the shelf-life is only weeks.
