= Richard Felix Marchand =

German chemist (1813–1850)

Richard Felix Marchand (August 25, 1813, Berlin – August 2, 1850, Halle an der Saale) was a German chemist. His son was the physician Felix Jacob Marchand (1846–1928).

In 1840, Marchand was appointed professor at the University of Berlin. In 1843, he accepted an appointment as associate professor of chemistry at the University of Halle. In 1846, he became full professor there. Together with Otto Linné Erdmann, he was editor of the Journal für praktischen Chemie ("Journal of Practical Chemistry") from 1839. A large number of experimental scientific investigations are given by him in Annalen der Physik.

He died in 1850 from cholera.

== Published works ==
- Grundriß der organischen Chemie, 1839 – Outline of organic chemistry.
- Lehrbuch der physiologischen Chemie, 1844 – Textbook of physiological chemistry.
- Chemische tafeln zur berechnung der analysen, 1847 – Chemistry tables for calculation.
- Ueber die alchemie, 1847 – On alchemy.
- Ueber die Luftschifffahrt, 1850 – On airship travel.
