= Werther (1927 film) =

1927 film by Milos Hajský

- Directed by: Milos Hajský
- Written by: Jaroslav Maria (novel); Milos Hajský; Jirí Fiala
- Starring: Milos Hajský
- Cinematography: Otto Heller
- Production company: Milos Hajský
- Distributed by: Fortunafilm
- Release date: 29 April 1927
- Country: Czechoslovakia
- Languages: Silent; Czech intertitles

Werther is a 1927 Czech silent film directed by and starring Milos Hajský. The film's art direction was by Vilém Rittershain.

== Cast ==
- Milos Hajský as Werther
- Marta Mayrová as Lotta
- Ela Poznerová as Zofie
- Ola Hors as Max
- Frantisek Havel as Buff
- Vladimír Zidlický as Kestner
- Frantisek Adam as Kampe
- Jan Marek as Choirmaster
- Jirí Fiala

== Bibliography ==
- Luboš Bartošek. Náš film: kapitoly z dějin, 1896-1945. Mladá fronta, 1985.
