= Sulfuryl diazide =

Names
- IUPAC name Sulfuryl diazide
- Other names Sulfuryl azide; Sulfonyl diazide

Identifiers
CAS Number	72250-07-8
3D model (JSmol)	Interactive image
ChemSpider	10606313
PubChem CID	15191028
CompTox Dashboard (EPA)	DTXSID401336969
- InChI: InChI=1S/N6O2S/c1-3-5-9(7,8)6-4-2 Key: HSVFKFNNMLUVEY-UHFFFAOYSA-N
- SMILES: [N-]=[N+]=NS(=O)(=O)N=[N+]=[N-]

Properties
Chemical formula	SO_{2}(N_{3})_{2}
Molar mass	148.10 g·mol^{−1}
Melting point	−15 °C (5 °F; 258 K)
- Except where otherwise noted, data are given for materials in their standard state (at 25 °C [77 °F], 100 kPa). Infobox references

Sulfuryl diazide or sulfuryl azide is a chemical compound with the molecular formula SO_{2}(N_{3})_{2}. It was first described in the 1920s when its reactions with benzene and p-xylene were studied by Theodor Curtius and Karl Friedrich Schmidt. The compound is reported as having "exceedingly explosive, unpredictable properties" and "in many cases very violent explosions occurred without any apparent reason".

== Synthesis ==
It was not until 2011 that sulfuryl diazide was isolated in a pure enough state to be fully characterized. It was characterized by infrared and Raman spectroscopy; its structure in the solid state was determined by x-ray crystallography. Its melting point is -15 °C. It was prepared by the reaction of sulfuryl chloride (SO_{2}Cl_{2}) with sodium azide (NaN_{3}) using acetonitrile as solvent:

SO_{2}Cl_{2} + 2 NaN_{3} → SO_{2}(N_{3})_{2} + 2 NaCl

== Physical properties ==
Sulfuryl diazide is extremely explosive and can explode even without strong external influences. The compound crystallizes in the monoclinic crystal system in the space group C2/c (space group no. 15) with the lattice parameters a = 24.3405 Å; b = 5.41599 Å , c = 17.2915 Å and β = 111.819°. Photolysis in an argon matrix initially yields a short-lived nitrene. Further decomposition leads primarily to elemental nitrogen and sulfur dioxide.

== Uses ==
Sulfuryl diazide has been used as a reagent to perform reactions that remove nitrogen from heterocyclic compounds:

R^{1}−NH−R^{2} + SO_{2}(N_{3})_{2} → R^{1}−R^{2} + SO_{2} + 2 N_{2} + HN_{3}

== See also ==
- Fluorosulfonyl azide
- Trifluoromethanesulfonyl azide
