= DBU =

DBU may refer to:

== Universities ==
- Dallas Baptist University, Texas, U.S.
- Debre Birhan University, Amhara Region, Ethiopia
- Desh Bhagat University, Mandi Gobindgarh, Punjab, India
- Duluth Business University, Minnesota, U.S.

== Other uses ==
- 1,8-Diazabicyclo[5.4.0]undec-7-ene, an organic chemical
- Bondum Dogon language of Mali (ISO 639-3 code: dbu)
- Danish Football Association (Dansk Boldspil-Union)
- dBu, "decibels unloaded" or "dBm unloaded", a logarithmic unit of signal voltage
- Deutsche Billard Union; see European Pocket Billiard Federation
- Deutsche Buddhistische Union, umbrella group of Buddhist associations in Germany
- Dutch Burgher Union of Ceylon, serving the Dutch Burghers ethnic group of Sri Lanka
