= Chlorosulfonyl isocyanate =

- Chlorosulfonyl isocyanate

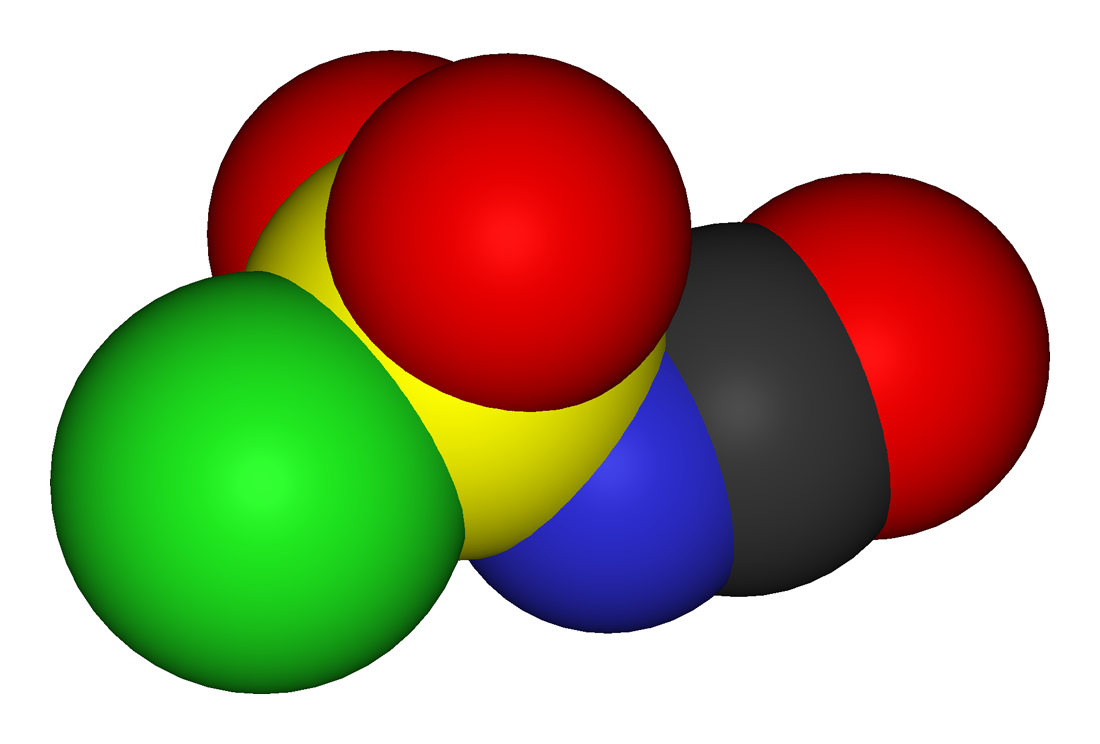
- Chlorosulfonyl isocyanate

Names
- IUPAC name Chlorosulfonyl isocyanate
- Other names N-Carbonylsulfamyl chloride Chloropyrosulfonyl isocyanate Sulfuryl chloride isocyanate

Identifiers
CAS Number	1189-71-5
3D model (JSmol)	Interactive image
ChemSpider	64080
ECHA InfoCard	100.013.378
EC Number	214-715-2
PubChem CID	70918
UNII	2903Y990SM
CompTox Dashboard (EPA)	DTXSID0061585
- InChI: InChI=1S/CClNO3S/c2-7(5,6)3-1-4 Key: WRJWRGBVPUUDLA-UHFFFAOYSA-N; InChI=1/CClNO3S/c2-7(5,6)3-1-4 Key: WRJWRGBVPUUDLA-UHFFFAOYAX
- SMILES: ClS(=O)(=O)N=C=O

Properties
Chemical formula	CNClO_{3}S
Molar mass	141.53 g/mol
Appearance	colorless liquid
Density	1.626 g/cm^{3}
Melting point	−44 °C (−47 °F; 229 K)
Boiling point	107 °C (225 °F; 380 K)
Solubility in water	decomposition
Solubility in other solvents	Chlorocarbons; MeCN
Refractive index (n_{D})	1.447

Structure
Molecular shape	tetrahedral at S

Hazards
- Occupational safety and health (OHS/OSH)
Main hazards	toxic, corrosive, flammable, reacts violently with water
- GHS labelling
Pictograms	(GHS05: Corrosive) (GHS06: Toxic) (GHS07: Exclamation mark) (GHS08: Health hazard)
Signal word	Danger
Hazard statements	H302, H312, H314, H330, H332, H334
Precautionary statements	P260, P264, P270, P271, P280, P284, P285, P301+P312, P301+P330+P331, P302+P352, P303+P361+P353, P304+P312, P304+P340, P304+P341, P305+P351+P338, P310, P312, P320, P321, P330, P342+P311, P363, P403+P233, P405, P501
NFPA 704 (fire diamond)	3 1 2 W
Safety data sheet (SDS)	"External MSDS"

Related compounds
Related compounds	Thionyl chloride Cyanogen bromide Phosphoryl chloride Fluorosulfonyl isocyanate
- Except where otherwise noted, data are given for materials in their standard state (at 25 °C [77 °F], 100 kPa). verify (what is ?) Infobox references

Chlorosulfonyl isocyanate is the chemical compound ClSO_{2}NCO, known as CSI. This compound is a versatile reagent in organic synthesis.

== Preparation, structure, handling ==
CSI is prepared by treating cyanogen chloride with sulfur trioxide, the product being distilled directly from the reaction mixture.

SO_{3} + ClCN → ClSO_{2}NCO

In this transformation, both the carbon and the nitrogen termini of CN are functionalized.

The structure of CSI is represented as Cl−S(=O)_{2}−N=C=O. It consists of two electron-withdrawing components, the chlorosulfonyl group (SO_{2}Cl) and the isocyanate group (−N=C=O). Because of its resulting electrophilicity, the use of CSI in chemical synthesis requires relatively inert solvents such as chlorocarbons, acetonitrile, and ethers.

== Uses ==
The molecule has two electrophilic sites, the carbon and the S(VI) center.

CSI has been employed for the preparation of β-lactams, some of which are medicinally important. Thus, alkenes undergo a [2+2]-cycloaddition to give the sulfonamide. The SO_{2}Cl group can be removed simply by hydrolysis, leaving the secondary amide. Other reactions of CSI:

- Cycloaddition to alkynes to give 1,2,3-oxathiazine-2,2-dioxide-6-chlorides.
- Conversion of primary alcohols to carbamates.
- Conversion of carboxylic acids and the acid chlorides into nitriles.
- Preparation of N,N-disubstituted sulfamides, R_{2}NSO_{2}NH_{2}
- Preparation of Burgess reagent

== Safety considerations ==
CSI is toxic, corrosive and reacts violently with water.

== Chemical properties ==
Chlorosulfonyl isocyanate reacts with sodium monofluoride to form fluorosulfonyl isocyanate:

ClSO_{2}NCO + NaF → FSO_{2}NCO + NaCl
