= Fluorosulfonyl azide =

Names
- Preferred IUPAC name N-Diazosulfamoyl fluoride

Identifiers
| CAS Number | 13537-39-8 |
| 3D model (JSmol) | Interactive image |
| PubChem CID | 21662529 |
- InChI: InChI=1S/FN3O2S/c1-7(5,6)4-3-2 Key: QAGYXMQZSHPCMY-UHFFFAOYSA-N
- SMILES: F[S](=O)(=O)N=[N+]=[N-]

Properties
| Chemical formula | FN_{3}O_{2}S |
| Molar mass | 125.08 g·mol^{−1} |
- Except where otherwise noted, data are given for materials in their standard state (at 25 °C [77 °F], 100 kPa). Infobox references

Fluorosulfonyl azide is an inorganic compound with the chemical formula FN_{3}O_{2}S. This is a derivative of sulfuric acid containing a fluorine atom and an azide group. The compound is used as a reagent for transferring diazo groups.

== Synthesis ==
Fluorosulfonyl azide can be prepared by reacting disulfuryl fluoride (F_{2}S_{2}O_{5}) with sodium azide in nitromethane or sulfolane.

== Chemical properties ==
Fluorosulfonyl azide is a diazo group transfer reagent. It is suitable, for example, for preparing azides from primary amines in a click reaction. Diazo reagents can be prepared starting from dimethyl 2-oxopropylphosphonate using fluorosulfonyl azide. If diazabicycloundecene is added as a base, the Ohira-Bestmann reagent is obtained. With magnesium oxide, the Seyferth-Gilbert reagent dimethyldiazomethylphosphonate is obtained.

These reagents are used to convert aldehydes into alkynes. With the two precursors, such a reaction is also possible as a one-pot synthesis. In this case, an aldehyde is added directly and potassium carbonate is used as the base.

== See also ==
- Diphenylphosphoryl azide
- Sulfuryl diazide
- Trifluoromethanesulfonyl azide
- Tosyl azide
