= Diphenylphosphoryl azide =

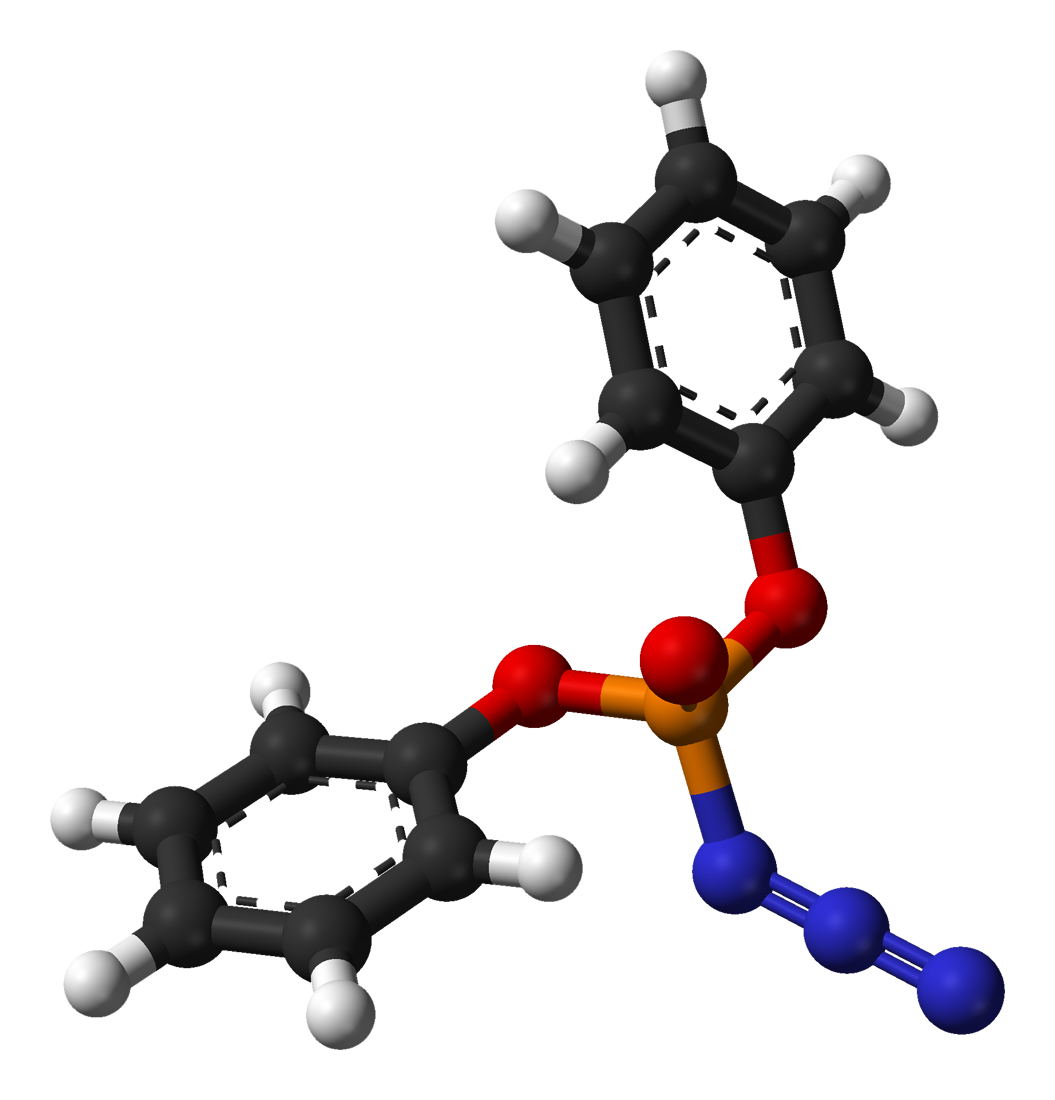

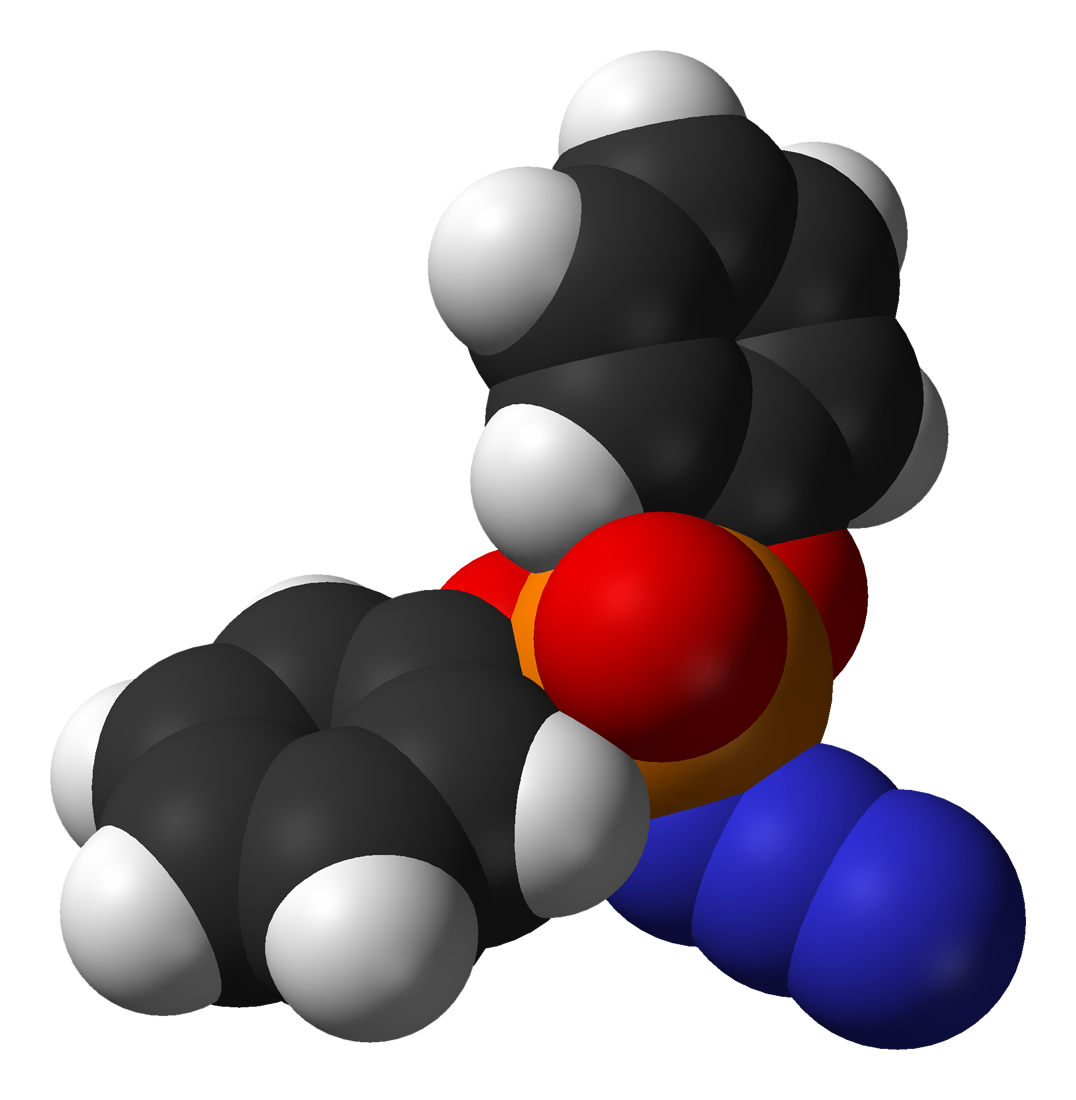

Names
- Preferred IUPAC name Diphenyl phosphorazidate
- Other names Diphenoxyphosphoryl azide Diphenylphosphonic azide Diphenyl azidophosphate Phosphoric acid diphenyl ester azide

Identifiers
CAS Number	26386-88-9
3D model (JSmol)	Interactive image
Abbreviations	DPPA
ChemSpider	110011
ECHA InfoCard	100.043.298
EC Number	247-644-0
PubChem CID	123414
UNII	GXM91165AV
CompTox Dashboard (EPA)	DTXSID10949274
- InChI: InChI=1S/C12H10N3OP/c13-14-15-17(16,11-7-3-1-4-8-11)12-9-5-2-6-10-12/h1-10H Key: MKRTXPORKIRPDG-UHFFFAOYSA-N; InChI=1/C12H10N3OP/c13-14-15-17(16,11-7-3-1-4-8-11)12-9-5-2-6-10-12/h1-10H Key: MKRTXPORKIRPDG-UHFFFAOYAD
- SMILES: C1=CC=C(C=C1)OP(=O)(N=[N+]=[N-])OC2=CC=CC=C2

Properties
Chemical formula	C_{12}H_{10}N_{3}O_{3}P
Molar mass	275.204 g·mol^{−1}
Appearance	Colourless or faintly yellow liquid
Density	1.277 g/cm^{3}
Boiling point	157 °C (315 °F; 430 K) (0.2 mmHg)
Solubility in water	Insoluble

Hazards
- GHS labelling
Pictograms	(GHS06: Toxic) (GHS07: Exclamation mark)
Signal word	Danger
Hazard statements	H301+H311+H331, H315, H319, H335
Precautionary statements	P260, P262, P264, P270, P271, P280, P284, P301+P310, P302+P350, P302+P352, P304+P340, P305+P351+P338, P310, P311, P312, P320, P330, P332+P313, P337+P313, P361, P362, P363, P403+P233, P405, P501
NFPA 704 (fire diamond)	4 1 0
Flash point	112 °C (234 °F; 385 K)
- Except where otherwise noted, data are given for materials in their standard state (at 25 °C [77 °F], 100 kPa). verify (what is ?) Infobox references

Diphenylphosphoryl azide (DPPA) is an organic compound. It is widely used as a reagent in the synthesis of other organic compounds.

== Uses ==
DPPA undergoes pseudohalogen replacement of the azido group by treatment with nucleophilic reagents, such as ammonia and various amines.

This compound is used as a reagent for the synthesis of peptides by virtue of its reactions with carboxylic acids leading to either the urethane or the amide. The formation of the urethane is particularly valuable since it works with carboxylic acids which fail to undergo the Schmidt reaction, and is believed to involve transfer of the azido group to the carboxylic acid.

It is now suggested that this reaction proceeds through the intermediate mixed anhydride, resulting from attack by the nucleophilic carboxylate anion on the phosphorus atom, with expulsion of the azide ion. The latter then attacks the carbonyl carbon atom, to give the acyl azide and loss of the diphenylphosphate anion, known to be a good leaving group. Finally, the acyl azide reacts in the normal manner to give the urethane.

Studies show that DPPA reacts with amines giving the corresponding phosphoramidates; it therefore appears that formation of the amide similarly involves the intermediate anhydride, followed by nucleophilic substitution by the amine.

In the synthesis of NSAIDs, DPPA is able to rearrange a propanoyl group into an isopropanoic acid.

DPPA is also used to prepare an acyl azide for use in the Curtius reaction.

== Safety ==
DPPA is very toxic and a potential explosive like most other azide compounds.

== See also ==
- Fluorosulfonyl azide
- Tosyl azide
- Trifluoromethanesulfonyl azide
