= Advanced Synthesis & Catalysis =

- Discipline: Organic chemistry, Organometallic chemistry, Applied chemistry
- Language: English
- Edited by: Joe P. Richmond

Publication details
- History: 1999–present
- Publisher: Wiley (Germany)
- Frequency: Bimonthly
- Impact factor: 4.0 (2024)

Standard abbreviations
- ISO 4: Adv. Synth. Catal.

Indexing
- CODEN: ASCAF7
- ISSN: 1615-4150 (print); 1615-4169 (web)
- OCLC no.: 46613903

Links
- Journal homepage; Online access

Advanced Synthesis & Catalysis is a bimonthly peer-reviewed scientific journal established in 1999 by Wiley. It covers research on homogeneous, heterogeneous, organic, and enzyme catalysis that are key technologies to achieve green synthesis, significant contributions to the same goal by synthesis design, reaction techniques, flow chemistry, and continuous processing, multiphase catalysis, green solvents, catalyst immobilization, and recycling, separation science, and process development. The editor-in-chief is Joe P. Richmond.
