= Gustav Werther =

German chemist (1815–1869)

August Friedrich Gustav Werther (1 August 1815, Roßla – 29 June 1869, Königsberg) was a German chemist. He made contributions in both organic and inorganic chemistry, being known for his work in the field of analytical chemistry.

== Education ==
In 1843, Werther obtained his doctorate in Berlin, where he served as an amanuensis to Eilhard Mitscherlich.

== Career ==
Werther was a chemistry instructor at the artillery and engineering school in Berlin. In 1853, Werther became an associate professor at the University of Königsberg, where in 1859 he was appointed a full professor of chemistry.

== Published works ==
From 1853 onward, he was an editor of Otto Linné Erdmann's Journal für practische Chemie. The following are some of Werther's principal works:

- De tartratibus nonnullis atque uvariatibus (1843).
- Die unorganische Chemie (1850/52) 2 divisions – Inorganic chemistry.
- Praktisches Handbuch bei dem Bau Eiserner Träger (1853).
- Die unorganische Chemie ein Grundriss für seine Vorlesungen, (1863) – Inorganic chemistry; an outline for lectures.
- Ueber eine Verbindung von Schwefel, Nickel und Wismuth – On the linking of sulfur, nickel and bismuth.
