= Trifluoromethanesulfonyl azide =

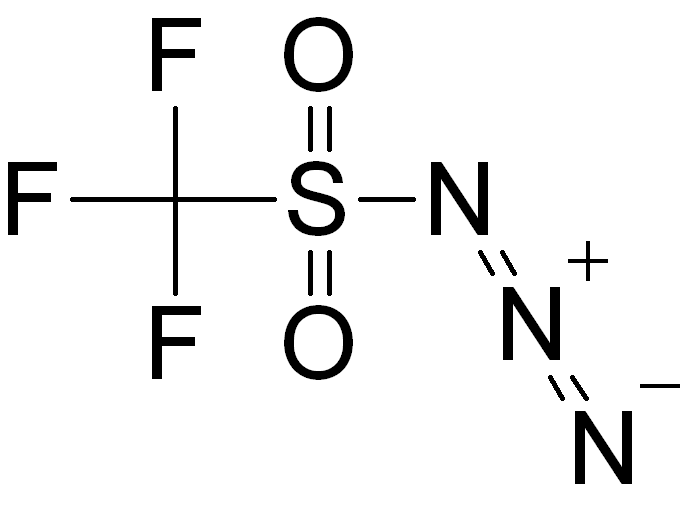

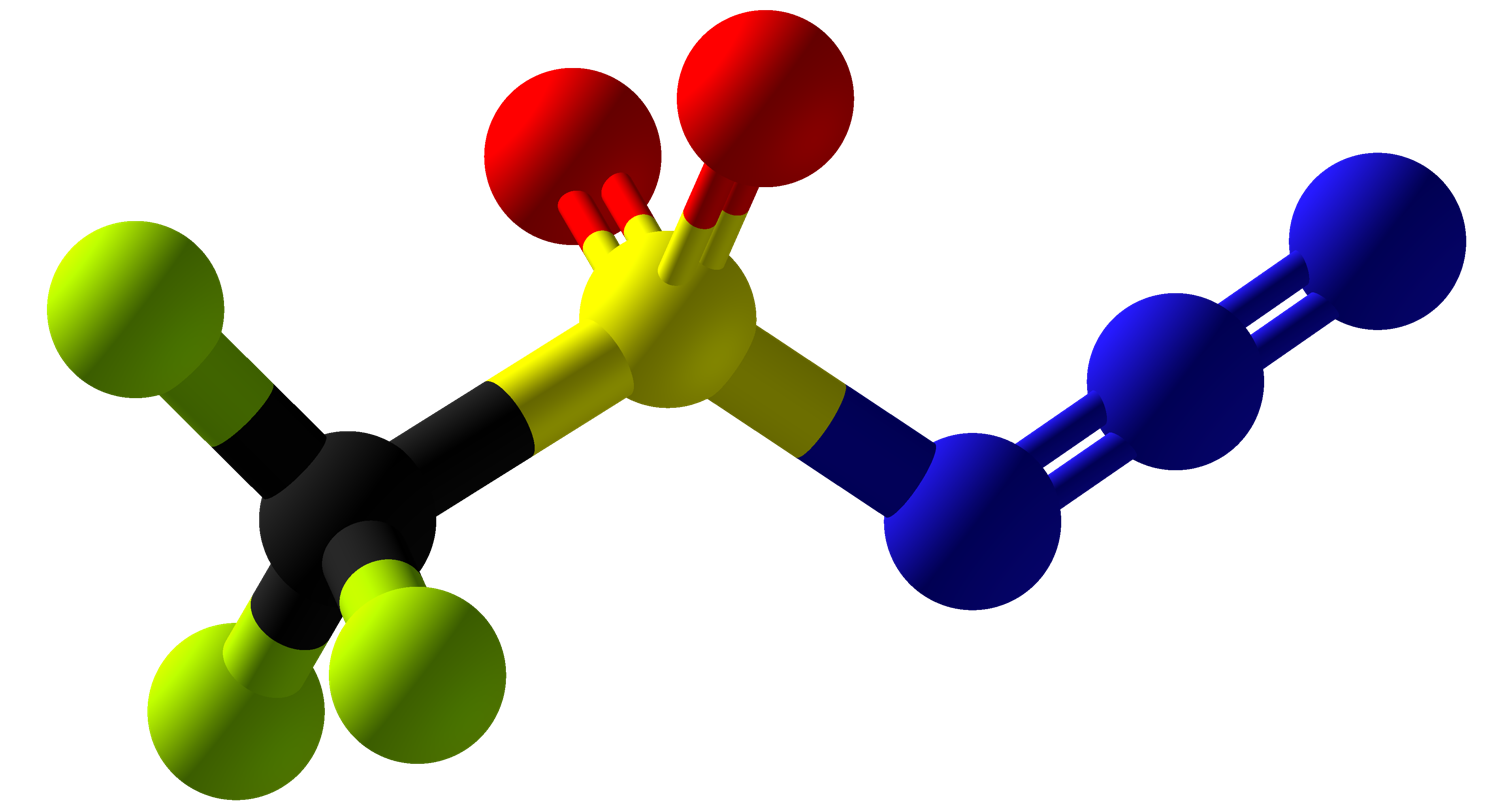

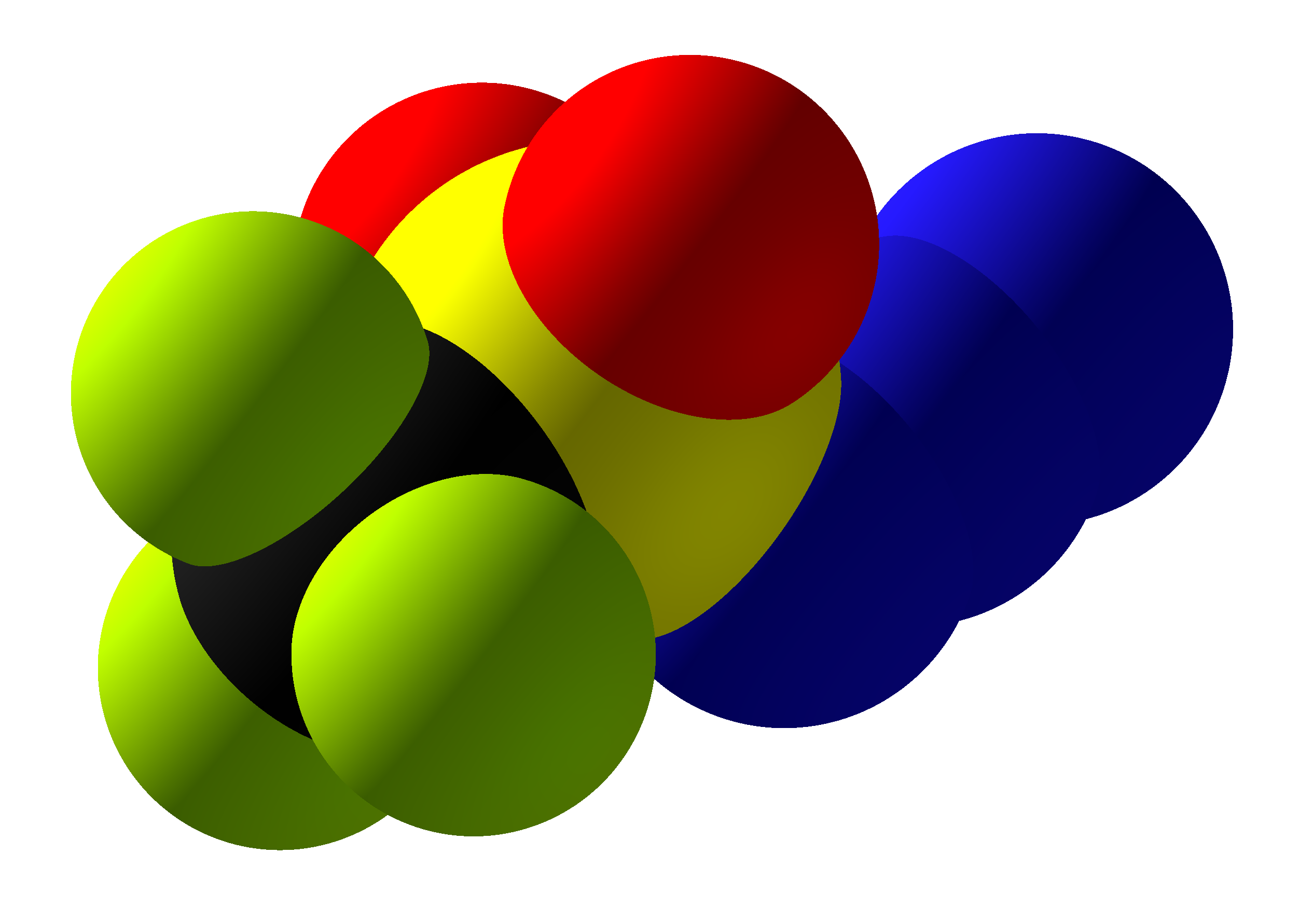

Names
- Preferred IUPAC name Trifluoromethanesulfonyl azide

Identifiers
CAS Number	3855-45-6
3D model (JSmol)	Interactive image
ChemSpider	9161983
PubChem CID	10986786
CompTox Dashboard (EPA)	DTXSID70450816
- InChI: InChI=1S/CF3N3O2S/c2-1(3,4)10(8,9)7-6-5 Key: NQPHMXWPDCSHTE-UHFFFAOYSA-N; InChI=1/CF3N3O2S/c2-1(3,4)10(8,9)7-6-5 Key: NQPHMXWPDCSHTE-UHFFFAOYAT
- SMILES: FC(F)(F)S(=O)(=O)N=[N+]=[N-]

Properties
Chemical formula	CF_{3}SO_{2}N_{3}
Molar mass	175.09 g·mol^{−1}
Boiling point	80-81 °C
Solubility in water	insoluble
- Except where otherwise noted, data are given for materials in their standard state (at 25 °C [77 °F], 100 kPa). verify (what is ?) Infobox references

Trifluoromethanesulfonyl azide or triflyl azide CF_{3}SO_{2}N_{3} is an organic azide used as a reagent in organic synthesis.

== Preparation ==
Trifluoromethanesulfonyl azide is prepared by treating trifluoromethanesulfonic anhydride with sodium azide, traditionally in dichloromethane. However, the use of dichloromethane is avoided since it can generate highly explosive azido-chloromethane and diazidomethane. The reaction may also instead be conducted in toluene, acetonitrile, or pyridine.

Tf_{2}O + NaN_{3} → TfN_{3} + NaOTf (Tf = CF_{3}SO_{2})

An alternative route starts from imidazole-1-sulfonyl azide.

== Reactions ==
Trifluoromethanesulfonyl azide generally converts amines to azides.

== See also ==
- Fluorosulfonyl azide
- Methanesulfonyl azide
- Tosyl azide
- Diphenylphosphoryl azide
- Sulfuryl diazide
