= Table of explosive detonation velocities =

This is a compilation of published detonation velocities for various high explosive compounds. Detonation velocity is the speed with which the detonation shock wave travels through the explosive. It is a key, directly measurable indicator of explosive performance, but depends on density which must always be specified, and may be too low if the test charge diameter is not large enough. Especially for little studied explosives there may be divergent published values due to charge diameter issues. In liquid explosives, like nitroglycerin, there may be two detonation velocities, one much higher than the other. The detonation velocity values presented here are typically for the highest practical density which maximizes achievable detonation velocity.

The velocity of detonation is an important indicator for overall energy and power of detonation, and in particular for the brisance or shattering effect of an explosive which is due to the detonation pressure. The pressure can be calculated using Chapman–Jouguet theory from the velocity and density.

Table of Explosive Detonation Velocities
Explosive class	Explosive name	Abbreviation	Detonation velocity (m/s)	Test Density (g/cm^{3})
Aromatic	1,3,5-trinitrobenzene	TNB	7,450	1.60
Aromatic	1,3,5-Triazido-2,4,6-trinitrobenzene	TATNB	7,300	1.71
Aromatic	4,4'-Dinitro-3,3'-diazenofuroxan	DDF	10,000	2.02
Aromatic	Trinitrotoluene	TNT	6,900	1.60
Aromatic	Diazodinitrophenol	DDNP	7,100	1.63
Aromatic	Trinitroaniline	TNA	7,300	1.72
Aromatic	Tetryl		7,570	1.71
Aromatic	Picric acid	TNP	7,350	1.70
Aromatic	Ammonium picrate (Dunnite)		7,150	1.60
Aromatic	Methyl picrate		6,800	1.57
Aromatic	Ethyl picrate		6,500	1.55
Aromatic	Picryl chloride		7,200	1.74
Aromatic	Trinitrocresol		6,850	1.62
Aliphatic	Nitrourea	NU	6,860	1.73
Aromatic	Lead styphnate		5,200	2.90
Aromatic	Triaminotrinitrobenzene	TATB	7,350	1.80
Aromatic	Dihydroxylammonium-5,5′-bistetrazolyl-1,1′-diolate	TKX-50	9,687	1.91
Aliphatic	1,1-diamino-2,2-dinitroethene	DADNE, FOX-7	8,335	1.76
Aliphatic	1,3,3-Trinitroazetidine	TNAZ	9,597	1.84
Inorganic	Ammonium perchlorate	AP	6,300	1.95
Aliphatic	Methyl nitrate	MN	6,818	1.22
Aliphatic	Nitroglycol/ethylene glycol dinitrate	EGDN	8,300	1.49
Aliphatic	Nitroglycerine	NG	7,700	1.59
Aliphatic	isopropyl nitrate	IPN	5,400	0.86
Aliphatic	Mannitol hexanitrate	MHN	8,260	1.73
Aliphatic	Pentaerythritol tetranitrate	PETN	8,400	1.76
Aliphatic	Erythritol tetranitrate	ETN	8,200	1.72
Aliphatic	Xylitol pentanitrate	XPN	7,100	1.852
Aliphatic	Ethylenedinitramine	EDNA	7,570	1.65
Aliphatic	Nitroguanidine	NQ	8,200	1.70
Aliphatic	Cyclotrimethylenetrinitramine	RDX	8,550	1.762
Aliphatic	Cyclotetramethylene tetranitramine	HMX	9,100	1.89
Aliphatic	Hexanitrodiphenylamine	HND	7,100	1.64
Aliphatic	Hexanitrohexaazaisowurtzitane	HNIW or CL-20	9,500	2.04
Aliphatic	Dinitroglycoluril	DINGU	8,450	1.94
Aliphatic	Tetranitroglycoluril	TNGU, Sorguyl, Sorguryl	9,150	1.95
Aliphatic	Hexanitrohexaazatricyclododecanedione	HHTDD	9,700	2.16
Aliphatic	5-Nitro-2,4-dihydro-3H-1,2,4-triazole-3-one	NTO	8,564	1.93
Aliphatic	Octanitrocubane	ONC	10,100	2.00
Aliphatic	Nitrocellulose	NC	7,050	1.20
Aliphatic	Urea nitrate	UN	4,700	1.67
Aliphatic	Hydrogen peroxide-urea	UHP	3,940	0.85
Aliphatic	Triacetone triperoxide	AP or TATP	5,300	1.18
Aliphatic	Methyl ethyl ketone peroxide	MEKP	5,200	1.17
Aliphatic	Hexamethylene triperoxide diamine	HMTD	4,500	0.88
Inorganic	Mercury fulminate		4,250	3.00
Inorganic	Potassium perchlorate aluminium mixture	KClO_{4}/Al	4,600	1.5
Inorganic	Lead azide		4,630	3.00
Inorganic	Nickel hydrazine nitrate	NHN	8,150	1.70
Inorganic	Silver azide		4,000	4.00
Aliphatic	Ammonium nitrate/fuel oil	AN/FO	4,940	1.30
Inorganic	Ammonium nitrate/hexamin	AMT	5,000	2.00
Inorganic	Ammonium nitrate/sugar	Ansu	3,400	1.75
Aliphatic	Nitromethane	NM	6,400	1.1371
Inorganic	Armstrong's mixture	AM	4,500	1.50
Aliphatic	Methylene dinitroamine	MEDINA	8,700	1.65
Explosive class	Explosive name	Abbreviation	Detonation velocity (m/s)	Test Density (g/cm^{3})

== See also ==
- TNT equivalent
- RE factor
