= Ethyl nitrate =

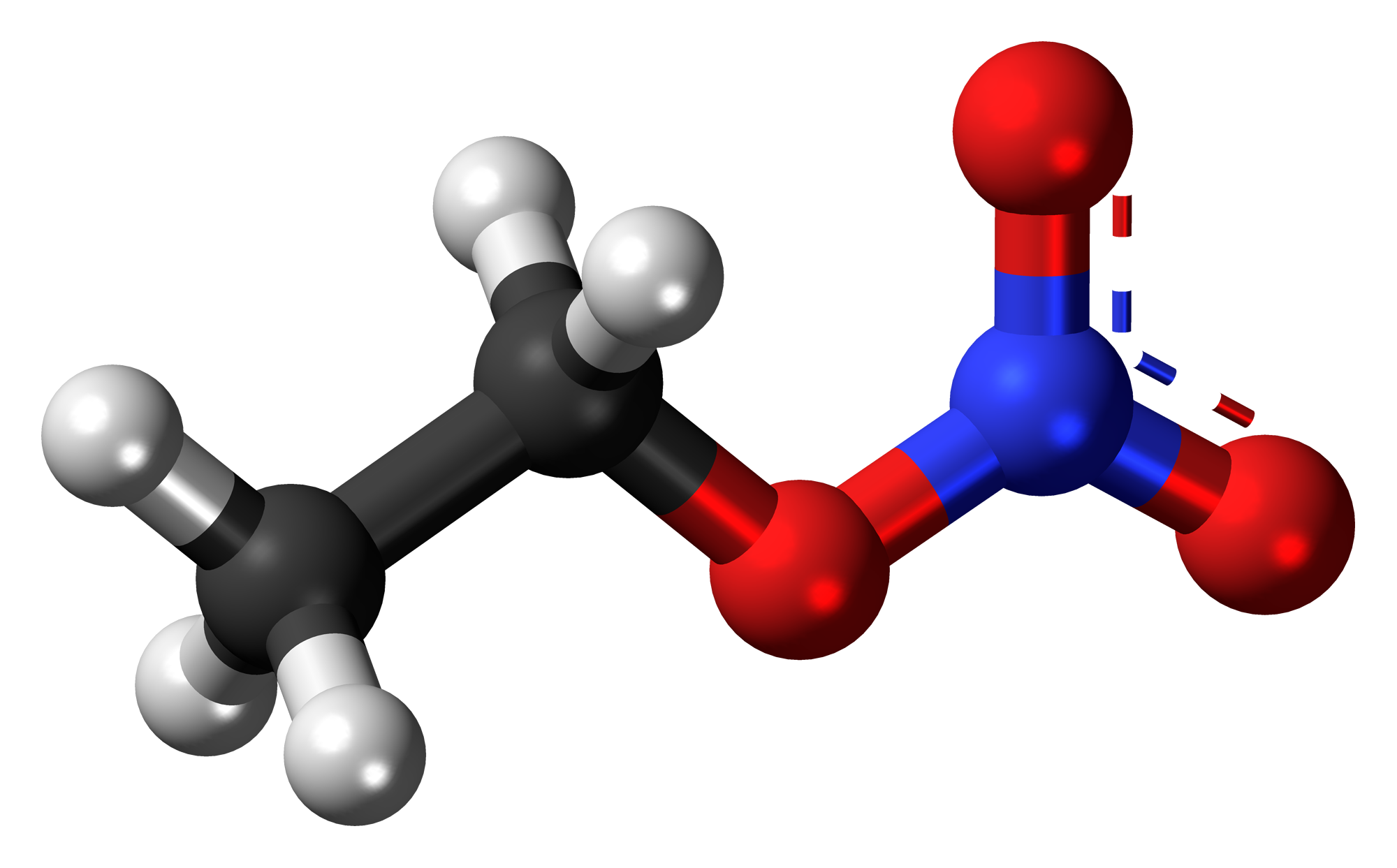

Names
- IUPAC name 1-Nitrosooxyethane
- Preferred IUPAC name Ethyl nitrate
- Other names Nitric acid ethyl ester

Identifiers
CAS Number	625-58-1
3D model (JSmol)	Interactive image
ChemSpider	11756
ECHA InfoCard	100.009.913
EC Number	210-903-3
PubChem CID	12259
UNII	E1ZT886LR5
UN number	1993
CompTox Dashboard (EPA)	DTXSID0060806
- InChI: InChI=1S/C2H5NO3/c1-2-6-3(4)5/h2H2,1H3 Key: IDNUEBSJWINEMI-UHFFFAOYSA-N; InChI=1/C2H5NO3/c1-2-6-3(4)5/h2H2,1H3 Key: IDNUEBSJWINEMI-UHFFFAOYAM
- SMILES: CCO[N+](=O)[O-]

Properties
Chemical formula	C_{2}H_{5}NO_{3}
Molar mass	91.066 g·mol^{−1}
Appearance	colorless liquid
Odor	sweet
Density	1.10 g/cm^{3}
Melting point	−102 °C (−152 °F; 171 K)
Boiling point	87.5 °C (189.5 °F; 360.6 K)
Solubility in water	soluble

Hazards
- GHS labelling
Pictograms	(GHS01: Explosive)
Signal word	Danger
Hazard statements	H200
Precautionary statements	P201, P202, P281, P372, P373, P380, P401, P501
NFPA 704 (fire diamond)	2 3 4
Flash point	−37 °C; −34 °F; 236 K
Explosive limits	4.1–50%

Related compounds
Related Alkyl nitrates	Methyl nitrate Ethylene glycol dinitrate Isopropyl nitrate
- Except where otherwise noted, data are given for materials in their standard state (at 25 °C [77 °F], 100 kPa). verify (what is ?) Infobox references

Ethyl nitrate is the ethyl ester of nitric acid and has the chemical formula CH_{3}CH_{2}NO_{3}. It is a colourless, volatile, explosive, and extremely flammable liquid. It is used in organic synthesis with use as a nitrating agent and as an intermediate in the preparation of some drugs, dyes, and perfumes. Like nitroglycerin, it is a vasodilator.

== History ==
Reaction of ethanol with nitric acid was investigated since the Middle Ages, but the fact that it produces mostly ethyl nitrite was not discovered until the 19th century. Eugène Millon was the first to synthesize ethyl nitrate in 1843 by adding urea to the mixture in order to remove any nitrous acid.

== Synthesis ==
Ethyl nitrate can be prepared by nitrosylating ethanol with fuming nitric acid or a mixture of concentrated sulfuric and nitric acids. Besides decomposing nitrous acid, the aforementioned necessary addition of urea prevents explosion. Further purifying by distillation carries a risk of explosion.

Ethyl nitrate has also been prepared by bubbling gaseous nitryl fluoride through ethanol at −10 °C. The reaction was subsequently studied in detail.

A nucleophilic substitution reaction of ethyl halides and silver nitrate can also yield ethyl nitrate. Again, purification poses explosion risks.

== Occurrence ==
Ethyl nitrate is found in the atmosphere, where it can react with other gases to form smog. The pollutant was originally thought to have been formed mainly by the combustion of fossil fuels. However recent analysis of ocean water samples reveal that in places where cool water rises from the deep, the water is saturated with alkyl nitrates, likely formed by natural processes.

== Chemical reactions ==
Ethyl nitrate can be reduced with stannous chloride to form hydroxylammonium chloride, though product separation is somewhat difficult.

== Explosive properties ==
Ethyl nitrate is a sensitive explosive that is prone to detonating upon impact or high temperatures, though is less so than methyl nitrate. It has a detonation velocity of 6,010 m/s, and is therefore a high explosive.
