= PLX =

Chemical compound

PLX, abbreviation of Picatinny Liquid Explosive, is a liquid binary explosive. It is a mixture of 95% nitromethane (NM) along with 5% ethylene diamine (EDA) as a sensitizer. Other amine compounds can be used instead of ethylene diamine, such as triethylene tetramine, diethylenetriamine or ethanolamine, but EDA has been found to be the most effective amine additive. PLX is a fairly powerful high explosive, marginally exceeding the destructive yield of TNT.

== Properties ==
PLX, when mixed, is a transparent liquid with a yellow-orange tint. Ethylene diamine is very volatile, requiring the contents to be sealed if any storage is intended. Generally, for safety purposes, the contents are transported separately and mixed on site. PLX is known to have a velocity of detonation (VoD) of anywhere between 6,000 and 7,000 m/s, depending on diameter. Although greatly sensitized by the addition of EDA, PLX still requires a powerful blasting cap or a small booster charge to successfully detonate.

== Uses and discovery ==
PLX was invented during World War II by the Picatinny Arsenal in New Jersey. It was originally designed to clear minefields by being spread via plane over the targeted area or poured from a safe distance and detonated by troops on the ground.

This explosive can also be gelled through the addition of nitrocellulose, ETN, or any number of soluble nitrate esters or gelling agents. This allows for powdered metals, such as aluminum or magnesium, to be suspended in the mixture. The metal powders act as fuel, increasing heat and energy output but lowering the brisance and velocity of detonation. The result is a more sustained blast wave and a "push and heave" effect, desirable for thermobaric purposes. Trzciński reports that 200 grams of a mixture of NM with PMMA as gelling agent and AlMg (45:55, mean particle size = 63 microns) as fuel, in a ratio of 67.2/2.8/30 by mass, has a peak overpressure of 120 kPa 2 m from the(open air) blast site, a 1.65 TNT equivalency in peak pressure, and a 1.62 equivalency in shockwave impulse. As a reference, 104 kPa is widely regarded as a pressure where 50% of eardrums fail. This is still 3 - 5 times less than the pressure needed to achieve a 50% fatality rate via pulmonary injury as per the Bass/Bowen equations (standing adult, facing any direction).

Nitromethane and explosives based on it have history of being used in terrorist attacks, such as Oklahoma City bombing. Nonetheless, nitromethane and compounds capable of sensitizing it are freely sold to the public in the US as of July 2026. Nitromethane, along with concentrated hydrogen peroxide and nitric acid were banned in the EU for unlicensed purchase in September 2014.

It was the supposed explosive used in the film Die Hard with a Vengeance. However, the film grossly exaggerated the sensitivity of this explosive mixture.

PLX was one of the explosives used to down Korean Air Flight 858 along with C-4.
