= Xylitol pentanitrate =

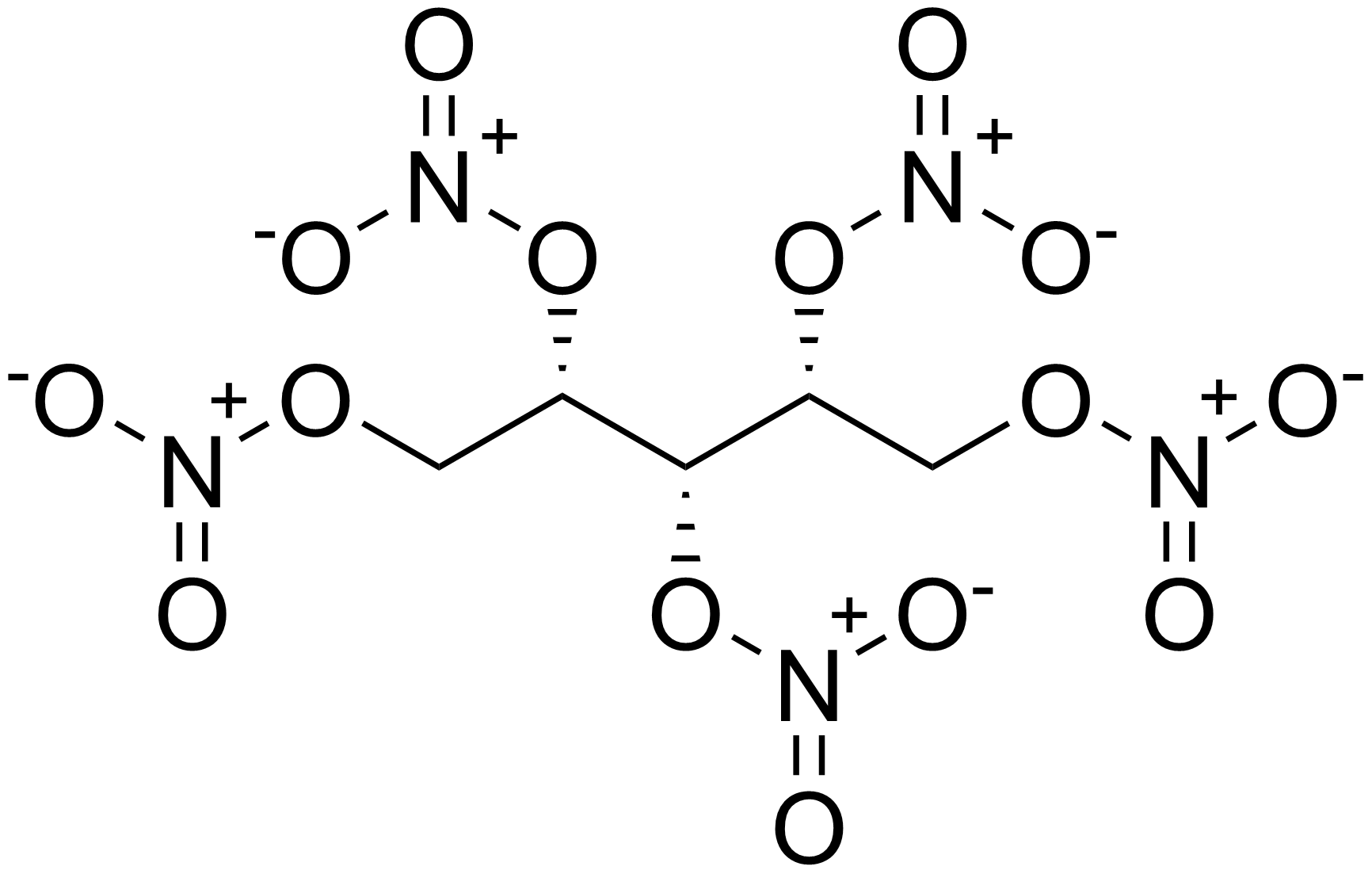

Names
- IUPAC name 1,2,3,4,5-Pentakis-nitrooxy-pentane

Identifiers
CAS Number	147-16-0
3D model (JSmol)	Interactive image
ChemSpider	29852477
PubChem CID	91383061
- InChI: InChI=1S/C5H7N5O15/c11-6(12)21-1-3(23-8(15)16)5(25-10(19)20)4(24-9(17)18)2-22-7(13)14/h3-5H,1-2H2/t3-,4+,5+ Key: STNMPEICBMBFAP-SCDXWVJYSA-N; InChI=1/C5H7N5O15/c11-6(12)21-1-3(23-8(15)16)5(25-10(19)20)4(24-9(17)18)2-22-7(13)14/h3-5H,1-2H2/t3-,4+,5+ Key: STNMPEICBMBFAP-SCDXWVJYBV
- SMILES: C([C@H]([C@@H]([C@H](CO[N+](=O)[O-])O[N+](=O)[O-])O[N+](=O)[O-])O[N+](=O)[O-])O[N+](=O)[O-]

Properties
Chemical formula	C_{5}H_{7}N_{5}O_{15}
Molar mass	377.131 g·mol^{−1}
Density	1.852 g/cm^{3}
Melting point	45.5 °C (114 °F; 318 K)
Boiling point	163-185 °C (346 - 358 °F; 436 - 458 K) (Decomposes)
Solubility	Soluble in ethanol, toluene, chloroform, acetone
log P	3.42

Structure
Crystal structure	Monoclinic

Explosive data
Shock sensitivity	4.5 J
Friction sensitivity	18 N
Detonation velocity	7,100 m/s

Hazards
- GHS labelling
Pictograms	(GHS01: Explosive) (GHS03: Oxidizing)
Autoignition temperature	167 °C (333 °F; 440 K)
- Lethal dose or concentration (LD, LC)
LC_{50} (median concentration)	148 μM (in splenocytes)

Related compounds
Related compounds	Xylitol; Erythritol tetranitrate Pentaerythritol tetranitrate
- Except where otherwise noted, data are given for materials in their standard state (at 25 °C [77 °F], 100 kPa). (what is ?) Infobox references

Xylitol pentanitrate (XPN) is a nitrated ester primary explosive first synthesized in 1891 by Gabriel Bertrand. Law enforcement has taken an interest in XPN along with erythritol tetranitrate (ETN) and pentaerythritol tetranitrate (PETN) due to their ease of synthesis, which makes them accessible to amateur chemists and terrorists.

== Properties ==
At room temperature XPN exists as a white crystalline solid. When heated to 163 °C, liquid xylitol pentanitrate begins to crackle and produce a dark vapour. When decomposed, a gram of XPN produces 200 mL of gas, which makes it a high performance explosive.

Rotter impact analysis of XPN found a figure of insensitivity of 25 (RDX = 80). XPN displayed a similar sensitivity to static discharge to ETN and PETN.

== Synthesis ==
Xylitol pentanitrate is formed by nitration of xylitol pentaacetate. Nowadays, fuming nitric acid and glacial acetic acid is often used, but Bertrand originally employed a cheaper nitrating agent, the mixture of nitric and sulfuric acids (he called it mélange nitrosulfurique, the common English name is "mixed acid").

== Complete oxidation ==
Much like ETN, XPN has a positive oxygen balance, which means the carbon and hydrogen in the molecule can be fully oxidized without another oxidizing agent being added:

4 C_{5}H_{7}N_{5}O_{15} → 20 CO_{2} + 14 H_{2}O + 10 N_{2} + 3 O_{2}

The decomposition of four molecules of XPN releases three O_{2}. The free oxygen molecules can be used to oxidize an added metal dust or negative oxygen balanced explosive such as TNT.

== See also ==
- Nitroglycerine
- Xylitan trinitrate – used as plasticizer in propellants similarly to nitroglycerine
- Mannitol hexanitrate
