= Erythritol tetranitrate =

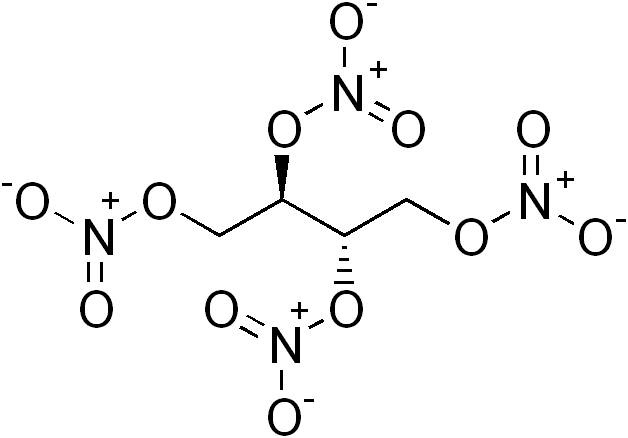

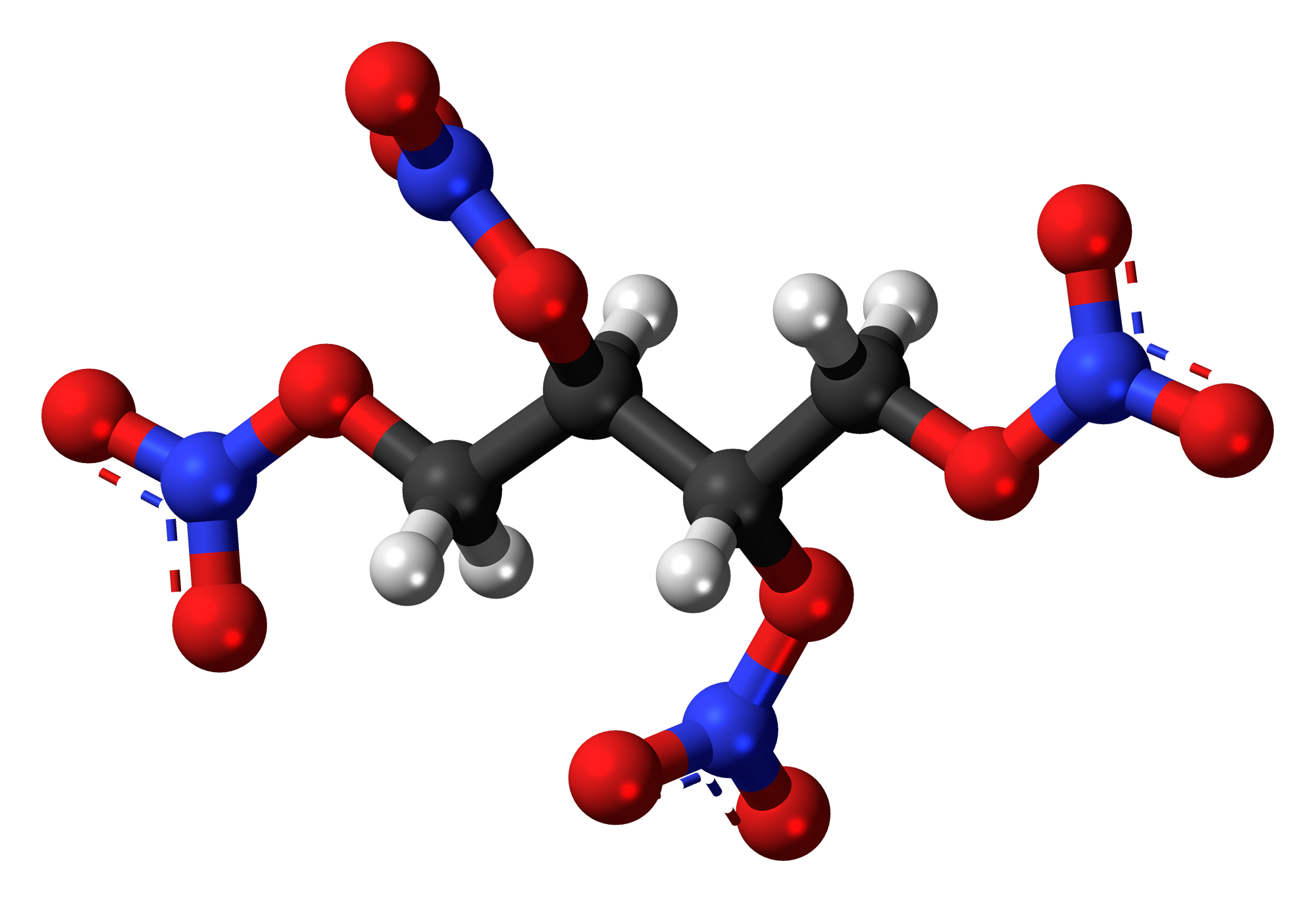

Names
- IUPAC name [(2R,3R)-1,3,4-Trinitrooxybutan-2-yl] nitrate
- Other names Erythrityl tetranitrate (INN)

Identifiers
CAS Number	7297-25-8
3D model (JSmol)	Interactive image
Beilstein Reference	1730082
ChEBI	CHEBI:60072
ChEMBL	ChEMBL2107583
ChemSpider	4447608
DrugBank	DB01613
ECHA InfoCard	100.027.940
EC Number	230-734-9
KEGG	D04051
PubChem CID	5284553
UNII	35X333P19D
CompTox Dashboard (EPA)	DTXSID9022990
- InChI: InChI=1S/C4H6N4O12/c9-5(10)17-1-3(19-7(13)14)4(20-8(15)16)2-18-6(11)12/h3-4H,1-2H2/t3-,4+ Key: SNFOERUNNSHUGP-ZXZARUISSA-N; InChI=1/C4H6N4O12/c9-5(10)17-1-3(19-7(13)14)4(20-8(15)16)2-18-6(11)12/h3-4H,1-2H2/t3-,4+ Key: SNFOERUNNSHUGP-ZXZARUISBH
- SMILES: C(C(C(CO[N+](=O)[O-])O[N+](=O)[O-])O[N+](=O)[O-])O[N+](=O)[O-]

Properties
Chemical formula	C_{4}H_{6}N_{4}O_{12}
Molar mass	302.108 g·mol^{−1}
Density	1.7219 (±0.0025) g/cm^{3}
Melting point	61 °C (142 °F; 334 K)
Boiling point	Decomposes at 160 °C
Solubility in water	0.00302 g/100 mL

Hazards
- GHS labelling
Pictograms	(GHS01: Explosive) (GHS03: Oxidizing) (GHS07: Exclamation mark)
NFPA 704 (fire diamond)	1 1 3 OX

Explosive data
Shock sensitivity	Medium (2.0 Nm)
Friction sensitivity	Medium
Detonation velocity	8200 m/s
RE factor	1.60
- Except where otherwise noted, data are given for materials in their standard state (at 25 °C [77 °F], 100 kPa). verify (what is ?) Infobox references

Erythritol tetranitrate (ETN) is an explosive compound chemically similar to PETN, though it is thought to be slightly more sensitive to friction and impact.

Like many nitrate esters, ETN acts as a vasodilator, and was the active ingredient in Cardilate tablets. Ingestion of or prolonged skin contact with ETN can lead to what is known as a nitro headache.

== History ==
ETN was discovered by John Stenhouse in 1849 by nitrating erythritol he recently discovered. He described its explosive properties but suggested an incorrect formula due to atomic weights not yet being accurately determined.

Its vasodilator properties have been researched since 1895.

DuPont researched the explosive after the war, getting a patent in 1928, but it was never commercialized due to the difficulty of erythritol synthesis. Only due to genetically-engineered yeasts in the 1990s did it become possible for the carbohydrate to become widely available.

== Properties ==
ETN has a relatively high velocity of detonation of 8,206 m/s (26,920 ft/s) at a density of 1.7219±0.0025 g/cm^{3}). It is white in color and odorless. ETN is commonly cast into mixtures with other high explosives. ETN dissolves readily in acetone and other ketone solvents. The impact and friction sensitivity is slightly higher than the sensitivity of pentaerythritol tetranitrate (PETN). The sensitivity of melt cast and pressed ETN is comparable. ETN is insoluble in water unlike lower nitrates of erythritol, such as erythritol trinitrate.

Much like PETN, ETN is known for having a very long shelf life. Studies that directly observed the crystalline structure saw no signs of decomposition after four years of storage at room temperature. ETN has a melting point of 61 °C (142 °F), compared to PETN which has a melting point of 141.3 °C (286.3 °F). Recent studies of ETN decomposition suggested a unimolecular rate-limiting step in which the O−NO_{2} bond is cleaved and begins the decomposition sequence.

Even small samples of ETN on the order of 20 mg can cause relatively powerful explosions verging on detonation when heated without confinement, e.g. when placed on a layer of aluminium foil and heated with flame from below.

ETN can be melt-cast in warm (about 65 °C (149 °F)) water. Slight decomposition is possible (often displayed by change in color from white to very light yellow). No reports of runaway reactions leading to explosion have been confirmed. However, the handling sensitivity in molten state is extremely poor (e. g., much worse than acetone peroxide) and it makes melt-casting it impractical for commercial applications.

Melt-cast ETN, if cooled down slowly over a period of 10–30 minutes, has a density of 1.70 g/cm^{3}, detonation velocity of 8,040 m/s (26,400 ft/s), and P_{cj} detonation pressure of about 300,000 bars (4,400,000 psi). Its brisance is far higher than that of Semtex (about 220,000 bars (3,200,000 psi), depending on brand). Mixtures of 50:50 PETN:ETN have P_{cj} slightly above 300,000 bars (4,400,000 psi) and detonation velocity above 8 km/s (26,000 ft/s). This is close to the maximum of fielded military explosives like LX-10 or EDC-29 (about 370,000 bars (5,400,000 psi) and close to 9 km/s (30,000 ft/s)).

ETN is often plasticized using PIB/synthetic oil binders (very comparable to the binder system in C4) or using liquid nitric esters. The PIB-based plastic explosives are nontoxic and completely comparable to C4 or Semtex with P_{cj} of 200,000–250,000 bars (2,900,000–3,600,000 psi), depending on density (influenced by crystal size, binder amount, and amount of final rolling). EGDN/ETN/NC systems are toxic to touch, quite sensitive to friction and impact, but generally slightly more powerful than C4 (P_{cj} of about 250,000 bars (3,600,000 psi) and E_{det} of 5.3 MJ/kg) and more powerful than Semtex (P_{cj} of about 220,000 bars (3,200,000 psi) and E_{det} below 5 MJ/kg) with P_{cj} of about 250,000–270,000 bars (3,600,000–3,900,000 psi) and E_{det} of about 6 MJ/kg. Note that explosion modeling software and experimental tests will yield absolute detonation pressures that can vary by 5% or more with the relative proportions being maintained. Erythritol tetranitrate can form eutectic mixtures with a variety of explosive compounds, including TNT, PETN, mannitol hexanitrate, and 1,3,5-trinitrobenzene.

125 grams (4.4 oz) of ETN based plastic explosive with EGDN/NC/camphor binder system with creamer on top of it

Melt-cast ETN gives invalid results in the Hess test, i.e. the deformation is greater than 26 mm, with the lead cylinder being completely destroyed. Semtex 1A gives only 21 mm in the same test, i.e. melt-cast ETN is at least 20% more brisant than Semtex 1A.

Melt-cast ETN or high density/low inert content ETN plastic explosives are one of the materials on "watch-lists" for terrorism.

== Oxygen balance ==
One positive characteristic of ETN that PETN does not possess is a positive oxygen balance, which means that ETN possesses more than enough oxygen in its structure to fully oxidize all of its carbon and hydrogen upon detonation. This can be seen in the schematic chemical equation below:

2 C_{4}H_{6}N_{4}O_{12} → 8 CO_{2} + 6 H_{2}O + 4 N_{2} + O_{2}

Whereas PETN decomposes to:

2 C_{5}H_{8}N_{4}O_{12} → 6 CO_{2} + 8 H_{2}O + 4 N_{2} + 4 CO

The carbon monoxide (CO) still requires oxygen to complete oxidation to carbon dioxide (CO_{2}). A detailed study of the decomposition chemistry of ETN has been recently elucidated.

Thus, for every two moles of ETN that decompose, one free mole of O_{2} is released. This oxygen could be used to oxidize an added metal dust, or an oxygen-deficient explosive, such as TNT or PETN. The extra oxygen from the ETN oxidizes the carbon monoxide (CO) to carbon dioxide (CO_{2}):

2 C_{4}H_{6}N_{4}O_{12} + C_{5}H_{8}N_{4}O_{12} → 13 CO_{2} + 10 H_{2}O + 6 N_{2}

== Manufacture ==
Like other nitrated polyols, ETN is made by nitrating erythritol either through the mixing of concentrated sulfuric acid and a nitrate salt, or by using a mixture of sulfuric and nitric acid.

== See also ==
- Mannitol hexanitrate
- Xylitol pentanitrate
- Pentaerythritol tetranitrate
