= C15H22O10 =

The molecular formula C_{15}H_{22}O_{10} (molar mass: 362.331 g/mol) may refer to:

- Catalpol
- Xylitol pentacetate
