= Nitroglycerin =

Chemical compound

- Skeletal formula of zwitterionic nitroglycerin

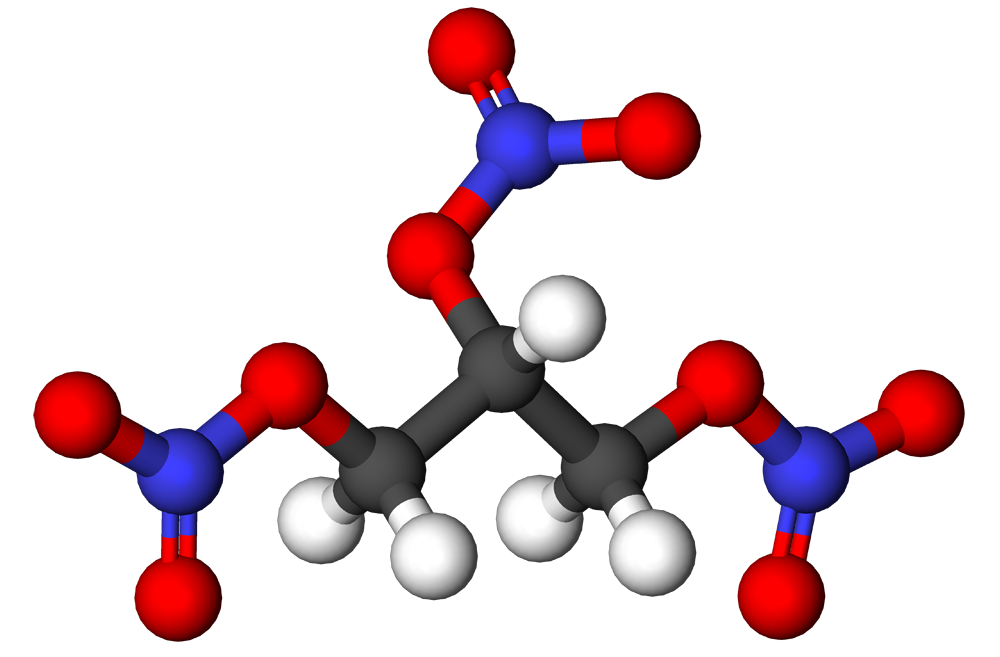
- Ball and stick model of nitroglycerin

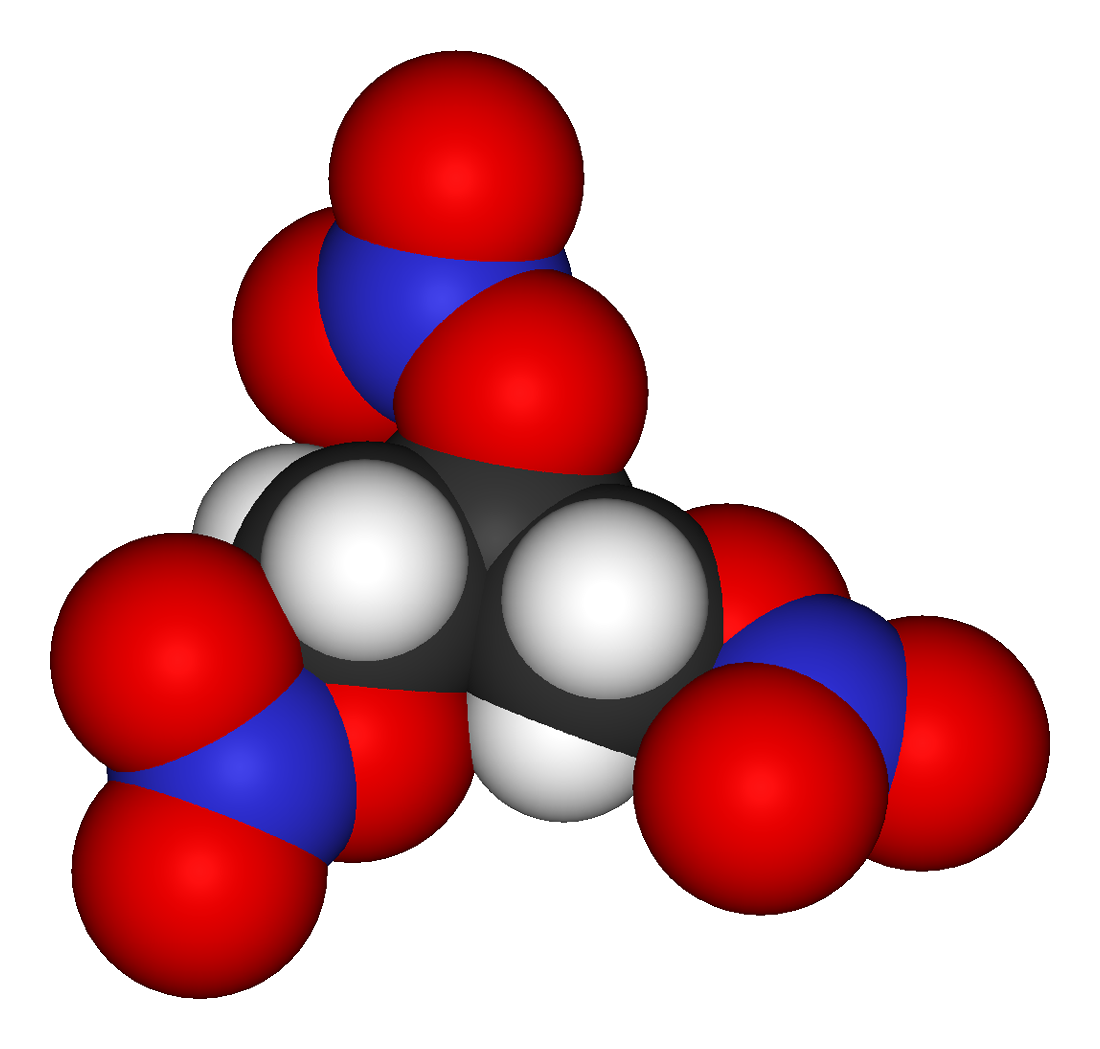
- Spacefill model of nitroglycerin

Names
- Preferred IUPAC name Propane-1,2,3-triyl trinitrate
- Other names: 1,2,3-Tris(nitrooxy)propane; 1,2,3-Trinitroxypropane; Glyceryl trinitrate; GTN; Nitro; TNG; Trinitroglycerin; alpha,alpha,alpha-Trinitroglycerin

Identifiers
CAS Number	55-63-0
3D model (JSmol)	Interactive image
Beilstein Reference	1802063
ChEBI	CHEBI:28787
ChEMBL	ChEMBL730
ChemSpider	4354
DrugBank	DB00727
ECHA InfoCard	100.000.219
EC Number	200-240-8
Gmelin Reference	165859
IUPHAR/BPS	7053
KEGG	D00515
MeSH	Nitroglycerin
PubChem CID	4510
UNII	G59M7S0WS3
UN number	0143, 0144, 1204, 3064, 3319
CompTox Dashboard (EPA)	DTXSID1021407
- InChI: InChI=1S/C3H5N3O9/c7-4(8)13-1-3(15-6(11)12)2-14-5(9)10/h3H,1-2H2 Key: SNIOPGDIGTZGOP-UHFFFAOYSA-N; InChI=1/C3H5N3O9/c7-4(8)13-1-3(15-6(11)12)2-14-5(9)10/h3H,1-2H2 Key: SNIOPGDIGTZGOP-UHFFFAOYAR
- SMILES: C(C(CO[N+](=O)[O-])O[N+](=O)[O-])O[N+](=O)[O-]

Properties
Chemical formula	C_{3}H_{5}N_{3}O_{9}
Molar mass	227.085 g·mol^{−1}
Appearance	Colorless or pale yellow, oily liquid or tetraclinic/orthorhombic crystal
Density	1.5931 g/cm^{3}
Melting point	12.8 °C (55.0 °F; 285.9 K)
Boiling point	218 °C (424 °F; 491 K) Explodes
Solubility in water	Slightly
Solubility	acetone, diethyl ether, benzene, toluene, ethanol
log P	2.154

Structure
Coordination geometry	Tetragonal at C1, C2, and C3; Trigonal planar at N7, N8, and N9
Molecular shape	Tetrahedral at C1, C2, and C3; Dihedral at N7, N8, and N9

Explosive data
Shock sensitivity	High
Friction sensitivity	High
Detonation velocity	7,820 m/s
RE factor	1.50

Thermochemistry
Std enthalpy of formation (Δ_{f}H^{⦵}_{298})	−370 kJ⋅mol^{−1}
Std enthalpy of combustion (Δ_{c}H^{⦵}_{298})	−1.529 MJ⋅mol^{−1}

Pharmacology
ATC code	C01DA02 (WHO) C05AE01 (WHO)
Routes of administration	Intravenous, by mouth, under the tongue, topical
- Pharmacokinetics
Bioavailability	<1%
Metabolism	Liver
Biological half-life	3 min
Legal status	AU: S3 (Pharmacist only)

Hazards
- Occupational safety and health (OHS/OSH)
Main hazards	Explosive, toxic
- GHS labelling
Pictograms	(GHS02: Flammable) (GHS06: Toxic) (GHS08: Health hazard) (GHS01: Explosive)
Signal word	Danger
Hazard statements	H202, H205, H241, H301, H311, H331, H370
Precautionary statements	P210, P243, P250, P260, P264, P270, P271, P280, P302+P352, P410
NFPA 704 (fire diamond)	3 2 4
- NIOSH (US health exposure limits)
PEL (Permissible)	C 0.2 ppm (2 mg/m^{3}) [skin]
- Except where otherwise noted, data are given for materials in their standard state (at 25 °C [77 °F], 100 kPa). verify (what is ?) Infobox references

Nitroglycerin (NG, alternative spelling nitroglycerine), also known as trinitroglycerin (TNG), nitro, glyceryl trinitrate (GTN), or 1,2,3-trinitroxypropane, is a dense, colorless or pale yellow, oily, explosive liquid most commonly produced by nitrating glycerol with white fuming nitric acid under conditions appropriate to the formation of the nitric acid ester. Chemically, the substance is a nitrate ester rather than a nitro compound, but the traditional name is retained. Discovered in 1846 by Ascanio Sobrero, nitroglycerin has been used as an active ingredient in the manufacture of explosives, namely dynamite, and as such it is employed in the construction, demolition, and mining industries. It is combined with nitrocellulose to form double-based smokeless powder, used as a propellant in artillery and firearms since the 1880s.

As is the case for many other explosives, nitroglycerin becomes more and more prone to exploding (i.e., spontaneous decomposition) as the temperature is increased. Upon exposure to heat above 218 °C at sea-level atmospheric pressure, nitroglycerin becomes extremely unstable and tends to explode. When placed in vacuum, it has an autoignition temperature of 270 °C instead. With a melting point of 12.8 °C, the chemical is almost always encountered as a thick and viscous fluid, changing to a crystalline solid when frozen. Although the pure compound itself is colorless, in practice the presence of nitric oxide impurities left over during production tends to give it a slight yellowish tint.

Due to its high boiling point and consequently low vapor pressure (0.00026 mmHg at 20 °C), pure nitroglycerin has practically no odor at room temperature, with a sweet and burning taste when ingested. Unintentional detonation may ensue when dropped, shaken, lit on fire, rapidly heated, exposed to sunlight and ozone, subjected to sparks and electrical discharges, or roughly handled. Its sensitivity to exploding is responsible for numerous devastating industrial accidents throughout its history. The chemical's characteristic reactivity may be reduced through the addition of desensitizing agents, which makes it less likely to explode. Clay (diatomaceous earth) is an example of such an agent, forming dynamite, a much more easily handled composition. The addition of other desensitizing agents gives birth to the various formulations of dynamite.

Nitroglycerin as a medication has been used since 1878 as a potent vasodilator (causing dilation of the vascular system) to treat heart conditions, such as angina pectoris and chronic heart failure. Though it was previously known that these beneficial effects are due to nitroglycerin being converted to nitric oxide, a potent vasodilator, the enzyme for this conversion was only discovered to be mitochondrial aldehyde dehydrogenase (ALDH2) in 2002. Nitroglycerin is available in sublingual tablets, sprays, ointments, and patches.

== History ==
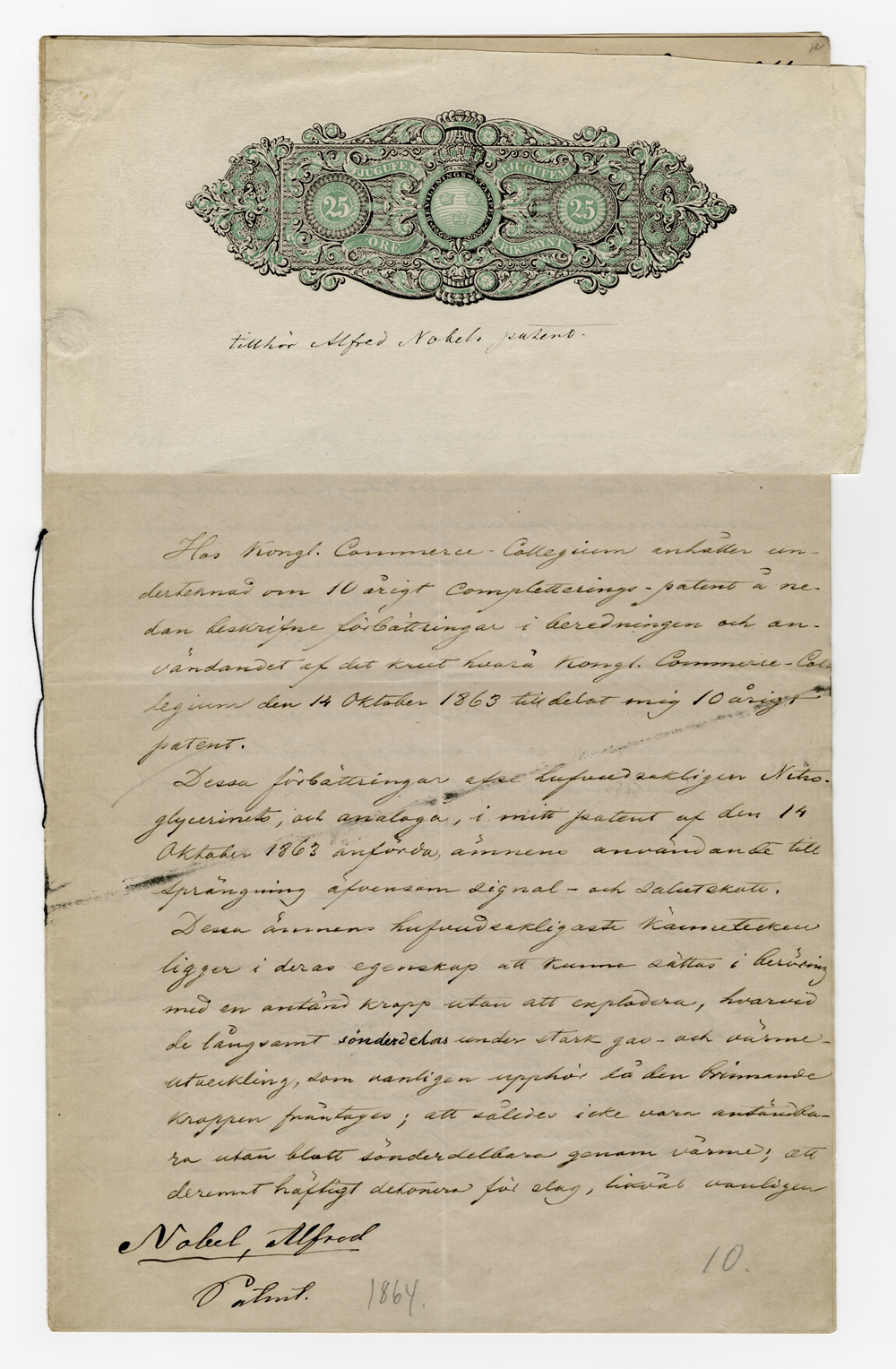
Alfred Nobel's patent application from 1864.

Nitroglycerin was the first practical explosive produced that was stronger than black powder. It was synthesized by the Italian chemist Ascanio Sobrero in 1846, working under Théophile-Jules Pelouze at the University of Turin. Sobrero initially called his discovery "pyroglycerin" and warned vigorously against its use as an explosive.

Nitroglycerin was adopted as a commercially useful explosive by Alfred Nobel, who experimented with safer ways to handle the dangerous compound after his younger brother, Emil Oskar Nobel, and several factory workers were killed in an explosion at the Nobels' armaments factory in 1864 in Heleneborg, Sweden.

One year later, Nobel founded Alfred Nobel and Company in Germany and built an isolated factory in the Krümmel hills of Geesthacht near Hamburg. This business exported a liquid combination of nitroglycerin and gunpowder called "Blasting Oil", but this was extremely unstable and difficult to handle, as evidenced in numerous catastrophes. The buildings of the Krümmel factory were destroyed twice.

In April 1866, several crates of nitroglycerin were shipped to California, three of which were destined for the Central Pacific Railroad, which planned to experiment with it as a blasting explosive to expedite the construction of the 1,659-foot-long (506 m) Summit Tunnel through the Sierra Nevada Mountains. One of the remaining crates exploded, destroying a Wells Fargo company office in San Francisco and killing 15 people. This led to a complete ban on the transportation of liquid nitroglycerin in California. The on-site manufacture of nitroglycerin was thus required for the remaining hard-rock drilling and blasting required for the completion of the First transcontinental railroad in North America.

On Christmas Day 1867, an attempt to dispose of nine canisters of Blasting Oil that had been illegally stored at the White Swan Inn in the centre of Newcastle upon Tyne resulted in an explosion on the Town Moor that killed eight people.

In June 1869, two one-ton wagons loaded with nitroglycerin, then known locally as Powder-Oil, exploded during transport while passing through the village of Cwm-y-glo in North Wales. The explosion led to the loss of six lives, many injuries, and much damage to the village. Little trace was found of the two horses. The UK Government was so alarmed at the damage caused and what could have happened in a city location (these two tons were part of a larger load coming from Germany via Liverpool) that they soon passed the Nitro Glycerine Act 1869 (32 & 33 Vict. c. 113). Liquid nitroglycerin was widely banned elsewhere, as well, and these legal restrictions led to Alfred Nobel and his company developing dynamite in 1867. This was made by mixing nitroglycerin with diatomaceous earth (Kieselguhr in German) found in the Krümmel hills. Similar mixtures, such as "dualine" (1867), "lithofracteur" (1869), and "gelignite" (1875), were formed by mixing nitroglycerin with other inert absorbents, and many combinations were tried by other companies in attempts to get around Nobel's tightly held patents for dynamite.

Dynamite mixtures containing nitrocellulose, which increases the viscosity of the mix, are commonly known as "gelatins".

Following the discovery that amyl nitrite helped alleviate chest pain, the physician William Murrell experimented with the use of nitroglycerin to alleviate angina pectoris and to reduce the blood pressure. He began treating his patients with small diluted doses of nitroglycerin in 1878, and this treatment was soon adopted into widespread use after Murrell published his results in The Lancet in 1879. A few months before he died in 1896, Alfred Nobel was prescribed nitroglycerin for this heart condition, writing to a friend: "Isn't it the irony of fate that I have been prescribed nitro-glycerin, to be taken internally! They call it Trinitrin, so as not to scare the chemist and the public." The medical establishment also used the name "glyceryl trinitrate" for the same reason.

=== Wartime production rates ===
Large quantities of nitroglycerin were manufactured during World War I and World War II for use as military propellants and in military engineering work. During World War I, HM Factory, Gretna, the largest propellant factory in the United Kingdom, produced about 800 tonnes of cordite RDB per week. This amount required at least 336 tonnes of nitroglycerin per week (assuming no losses in production). The Royal Navy had its own factory at the Royal Navy Cordite Factory, Holton Heath, in Dorset, England. A large cordite factory was also built in Canada during World War I. The Canadian Explosives Limited cordite factory at Nobel, Ontario was designed to produce 1,500,000 lb (680 t) of cordite per month, requiring about 286 tonnes of nitroglycerin per month.

== Instability and desensitization ==
In its undiluted form, nitroglycerin is a contact explosive, meaning physical shock causes it to explode. If it has not been adequately purified during manufacture, it can degrade over time to even more unstable forms. This makes nitroglycerin highly dangerous to transport or use. In its undiluted form, it is one of the world's most powerful explosives, comparable to the more recently developed RDX and PETN.

Early in its history, liquid nitroglycerin was found to be "desensitized" by freezing it at a temperature below 45 to 55 °F (7 to 13 °C), depending on its purity. Its sensitivity to shock while frozen is somewhat unpredictable: "It is more insensitive to the shock from a fulminate cap or a rifle ball when in that condition but on the other hand it appears to be more liable to explode on breaking, crushing, tamping, etc." Frozen nitroglycerin is much less energetic than liquid, and so must be thawed before use. Thawing it out can be extremely sensitizing, especially if impurities are present or the warming is too rapid. Ethylene glycol dinitrate or another polynitrate may be added to lower the melting point and thereby avoid the necessity of thawing frozen explosive.

Chemically "desensitizing" nitroglycerin is possible to a point where it can be considered about as "safe" as modern high explosives, such as by the addition of ethanol, acetone, or dinitrotoluene. The nitroglycerin may have to be extracted from the desensitizer chemical to restore its effectiveness before use, such as by adding water to draw off ethanol used as a desensitizer.

== Detonation ==
When nitroglycerin explodes, the products after cooling are given by:

4C_{3}H_{5}N_{3}O_{9} → 12CO_{2} + 10H_{2}O + 6N_{2} + O_{2}

The heat released can be calculated from the heats of formation. Using −371 kJ/mol for the heat of formation of condensed phase nitroglycerin gives 1414 kJ/mol released if forming water vapor, and 1524 if forming liquid water.

The detonation velocity of nitroglycerin is 7820 meters per second, which is about 113% the speed of TNT. Accordingly, nitroglycerin is considered to be a high-brisance explosive, which is to say, it has excellent shattering ability. The heat liberated during detonation raises the temperature of the gaseous byproducts to about 5,000 °C (9,000 °F). With a standard enthalpy of explosive decomposition of −1414 kJ/mol and a molecular weight of 227.0865 g/mol, nitroglycerin has a specific explosive energy density of 1.488 kilocalories per gram, or 6.23 kJ/g, making nitroglycerin 49% more energetic on a mass basis than the standard definitional value assigned to TNT (precisely 1 kcal/g).

== Manufacturing ==
Nitroglycerin synthesis

Nitroglycerin can be produced by acid-catalyzed nitration of glycerol (glycerin).

The industrial manufacturing process often reacts glycerol with a nearly 1:1 mixture of concentrated sulfuric acid and concentrated nitric acid. This can be produced by mixing white fuming nitric acid—a quite expensive pure nitric acid in which the oxides of nitrogen have been removed, as opposed to red fuming nitric acid, which contains nitrogen oxides—and concentrated sulfuric acid. More often, this mixture is attained by the cheaper method of mixing fuming sulfuric acid, also known as oleum—sulfuric acid containing excess sulfur trioxide—and azeotropic nitric acid (consisting of about 70% nitric acid, with the rest being water).

The sulfuric acid produces protonated nitric acid species, which are attacked by glycerol's nucleophilic oxygen atoms. The nitro group is thus added as an ester C−O−NO_{2}, and water is produced. This is different from an electrophilic aromatic substitution reaction in which nitronium ions are the electrophile.

The addition of glycerol results in an exothermic reaction (i.e., heat is produced), as usual for mixed-acid nitrations. If the mixture becomes too hot, it results in a runaway reaction, a state of accelerated nitration accompanied by the destructive oxidation of organic materials by the hot nitric acid and the release of poisonous nitrogen dioxide gas at high risk of an explosion. Thus, the glycerin mixture is added slowly to the reaction vessel containing the mixed acid (not acid to glycerin). The nitrator is cooled with cold water or some other coolant mixture and maintained throughout the glycerin addition at about 22 °C (72 °F), hot enough for esterification to occur at a fast rate but cold enough to avoid runaway reaction. The nitrator vessel, often constructed of iron or lead and generally stirred with compressed air, has an emergency trap door at its base, which hangs over a large pool of very cold water and into which the whole reaction mixture (called the charge) can be dumped to prevent an explosion, a process referred to as drowning. If the temperature of the charge exceeds about 30 °C (86 °F) (actual value varying by country) or brown fumes are seen in the nitrator's vent, then it is immediately drowned.

== Use as an explosive and a propellant ==
Nitroglycerin is an oily liquid that explodes when subjected to heat, shock, or flame. The main use of nitroglycerin, by tonnage, is in explosives such as dynamite and in propellants as an ingredient. However, its sensitivity has limited the usefulness of nitroglycerin as a military explosive; less sensitive explosives such as TNT, RDX, and HMX have largely replaced it in munitions.

Alfred Nobel developed the use of nitroglycerin as a blasting explosive by mixing nitroglycerin with inert absorbents, particularly "Kieselguhr", or diatomaceous earth. He named this explosive dynamite and patented it in 1867. It was supplied ready for use in the form of sticks, individually wrapped in greased waterproof paper. Dynamite and similar explosives were widely adopted for civil engineering tasks, such as in drilling highway and railroad tunnels, for mining, for clearing farmland of stumps, in quarrying, and in demolition work. Likewise, military engineers have used dynamite for construction and demolition work.

Nitroglycerin has been used in conjunction with hydraulic fracturing, a process used to recover oil and gas from shale formations. The technique involves displacing and detonating nitroglycerin in natural or hydraulically induced fracture systems, or displacing and detonating nitroglycerin in hydraulically induced fractures followed by wellbore shots using pelletized TNT.

Nitroglycerin has an advantage over some other high explosives in that, on detonation, it produces practically no visible smoke. Therefore, it is useful as an ingredient in the formulation of various kinds of smokeless powder.

Alfred Nobel then developed ballistite by combining nitroglycerin and guncotton. He patented it in 1887. Ballistite was adopted by several European governments as a military propellant. Italy was the first to adopt it. The British government and the Commonwealth governments adopted cordite instead, which had been developed by Sir Frederick Abel and Sir James Dewar of the United Kingdom in 1889. The original Cordite Mk I consisted of 58% nitroglycerin, 37% guncotton, and 5.0% petroleum jelly. Ballistite and cordite were both manufactured in the form of "cords".

Smokeless powders were originally developed using nitrocellulose as the sole explosive ingredient. Therefore, they were known as single-base propellants. A range of smokeless powders that contain both nitrocellulose and nitroglycerin, known as double-base propellants, was also developed. Smokeless powders were originally supplied only for military use, but they were also soon developed for civilian use and were quickly adopted for sports. Some are known as sporting powders. Triple-base propellants contain nitrocellulose, nitroglycerin, and nitroguanidine, but are reserved mainly for extremely high-caliber ammunition rounds such as those used in tank cannons and naval artillery. Blasting gelatin, also known as gelignite, was invented by Nobel in 1875, using nitroglycerin, wood pulp, and sodium or potassium nitrate. This was an early, low-cost, flexible explosive.

== Medical use ==
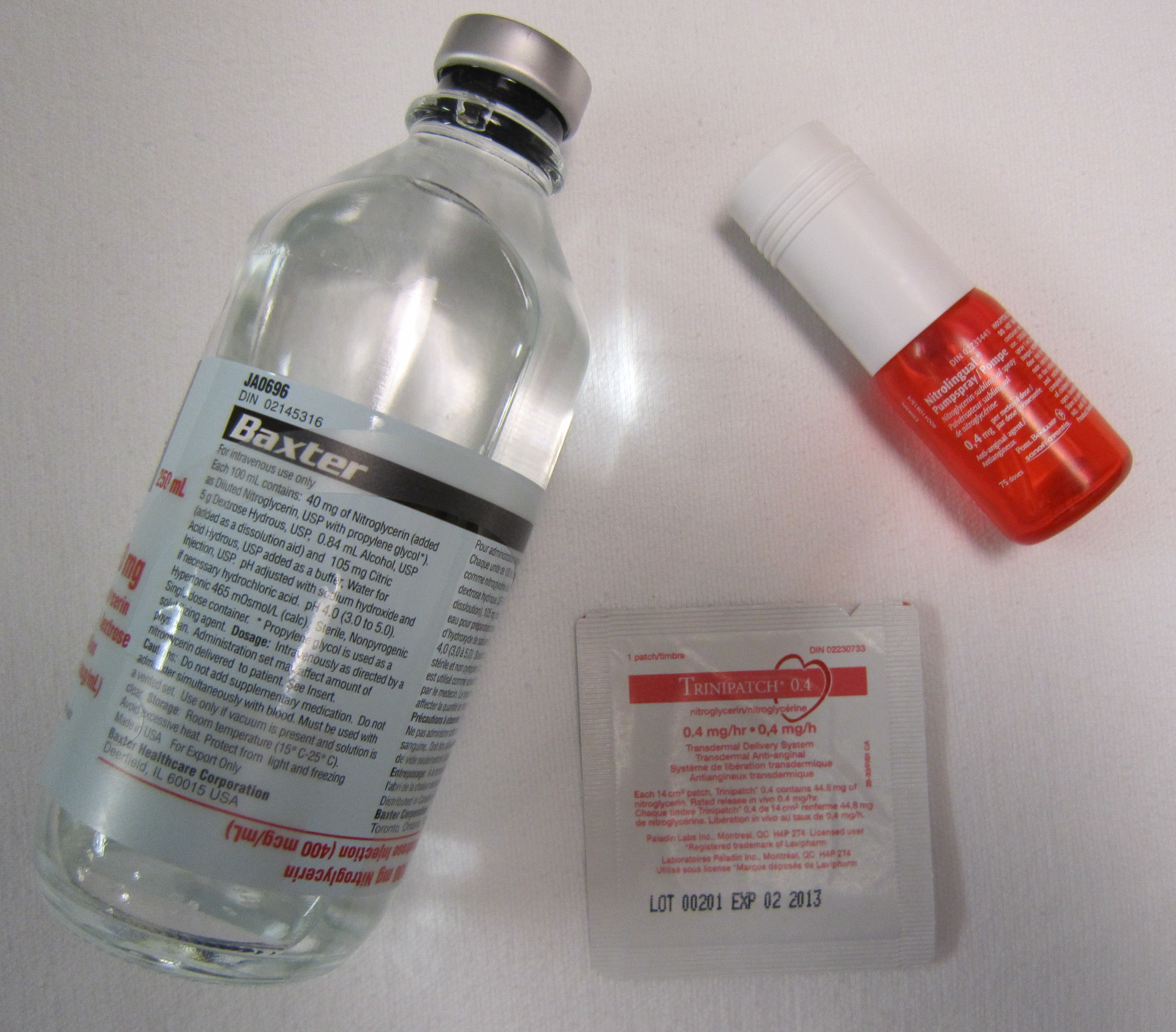
Nitroglycerin in three different forms: intravenous, sublingual spray, and the nitroglycerin patch.

Nitroglycerin belongs to a group of drugs called nitrates, which includes many other nitrates like isosorbide dinitrate (Isordil) and isosorbide mononitrate (Imdur, Ismo, Monoket). These agents all exert their effect by being converted to nitric oxide in the body by mitochondrial aldehyde dehydrogenase (ALDH2), and nitric oxide is a potent natural vasodilator.

In medicine, nitroglycerin is probably most commonly prescribed for angina pectoris, a painful symptom of ischemic heart disease caused by inadequate flow of blood and oxygen to the heart, and as a potent antihypertensive agent. Nitroglycerin corrects the imbalance between the flow of oxygen and blood to the heart and the heart's energy demand. There are many formulations on the market at different doses. At low doses, nitroglycerin dilates veins more than arteries, thereby reducing preload (volume of blood in the heart after filling); this is thought to be its primary mechanism of action. By decreasing preload, the heart has less blood to pump, which decreases oxygen requirement since the heart does not have to work as hard. Additionally, having a smaller preload reduces the ventricular transmural pressure (pressure exerted on the walls of the heart), which decreases the compression of heart arteries to allow more blood to flow through the heart. At higher doses, it also dilates arteries, thereby reducing afterload (decreasing the pressure against which the heart must pump). An improved ratio of myocardial oxygen demand to supply leads to the following therapeutic effects during episodes of angina pectoris: subsiding of chest pain, decrease of blood pressure, increase of heart rate, and orthostatic hypotension. Patients experiencing angina when doing certain physical activities can often prevent symptoms by taking nitroglycerin 5 to 10 minutes before the activity. Overdoses may generate methemoglobinemia.

Nitroglycerin is available in tablets, ointment, solution for intravenous use, transdermal patches, or sprays administered sublingually. Some forms of nitroglycerin last much longer in the body than others. Nitroglycerin, as well as the onset and duration of action of each form, is different. The sublingual or tablet spray of nitroglycerin has a two-minute onset and a twenty-five-minute duration of action. The oral formulation of nitroglycerin has a thirty-five-minute onset and a duration of action of 4–8 hours. The transdermal patch has an onset of thirty minutes and a duration of action of ten to twelve hours. Continuous exposure to nitrates has been shown to cause the body to stop responding normally to this medicine. Experts recommend that the patches be removed at night, allowing the body a few hours to restore its responsiveness to nitrates. Shorter-acting preparations of nitroglycerin can be used several times a day with less risk of developing tolerance. Nitroglycerin was first used by William Murrell to treat angina attacks in 1878, with the discovery published that same year.

== Industrial exposure ==
Infrequent exposure to high doses of nitroglycerin can cause severe headaches known as "NG head" or "bang head". These headaches can be severe enough to incapacitate some people; however, humans develop a tolerance to and dependence on nitroglycerin after long-term exposure. Although rare, withdrawal can be fatal; symptoms include chest pain and other heart problems. These symptoms may be relieved with re-exposure to nitroglycerin or other suitable organic nitrates.

For workers in nitroglycerin (NTG) manufacturing facilities, the effects of withdrawal sometimes include "Sunday heart attacks" in those experiencing regular nitroglycerin exposure in the workplace, leading to the development of tolerance for the venodilating effects. Over the weekend, the workers lost their tolerance, and when they were re-exposed on Monday, the drastic vasodilation produced a fast heart rate, dizziness, and a headache. This is referred to as "Monday disease".

People can be exposed to nitroglycerin in the workplace by breathing it in, skin absorption, swallowing it, or eye contact. The Occupational Safety and Health Administration has set the legal limit (permissible exposure limit) for nitroglycerin exposure in the workplace as 0.2 ppm (2 mg/m^{3}) skin exposure over an 8-hour workday. The National Institute for Occupational Safety and Health has set a recommended exposure limit of 0.1 mg/m^{3} skin exposure over an 8-hour workday. At levels of 75 mg/m^{3}, nitroglycerin is immediately dangerous to life and health.

== See also ==
- Erythritol tetranitrate
- Ethylene glycol dinitrate
- Mannitol hexanitrate
- Methyl nitrate
- Relative effectiveness factor
- Tetranitratoxycarbon
- Xylitol pentanitrate
