= MHN =

MHN may refer to:

- Mannitol hexanitrate, explosive used in detonators;
- As an initialism, MHN corresponds into different languages to several natural history museums, like in Spanish the Museo de Historia Natural (in Mexico) or in French the Muséum d'histoire naturelle de Genève (in Switzerland);
- National Historical Museum (Argentina), Argentine national museum, "Museo Histórico Nacional" in Spanish;
- MHN, a subsidiary of Health Net.
