= Cardilate =

Cardilate is a trade name for two different drugs:

- Erythritol tetranitrate (most prevalent usage of the trade name), and
- Pindolol
