= Ascanio Sobrero =

Italian chemist (1812–1888)

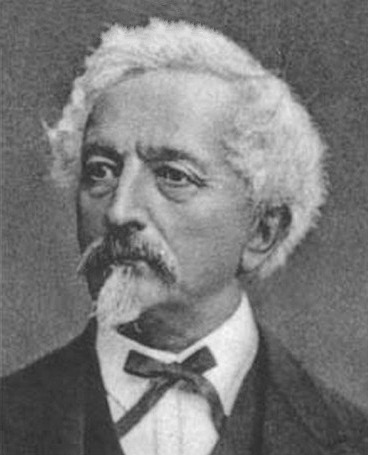
- Ascanio Sobrero
- Born: 12 October 1812; Casale Monferrato
- Died: 26 May 1888 (aged 75); Turin, Italy
- Education: University of Gießen
- Known for: discovery of nitroglycerine
- Scientific career
- Fields: Organic chemistry
- Workplaces: University of Gießen, University of Turin
- Doctoral advisor: Justus Liebig

Ascanio Sobrero (12 October 1812 – 26 May 1888) was an Italian chemist, born in Casale Monferrato. He studied under Théophile-Jules Pelouze at the University of Turin, who had worked with the explosive material guncotton.

== Education and career ==
He studied medicine in Turin and Paris and then chemistry at the University of Gießen with Justus Liebig, and earned his doctorate in 1832. In 1845, he became a professor at the University of Turin.

During his research, he discovered, in 1847, nitroglycerine. He initially called it "pyroglycerine", and warned vigorously against its use. In fact, he was so frightened by what he created that he kept it a secret for over a year.

Another of Pelouze's students was the young Alfred Nobel, who returned to the Nobel family's defunct armaments factory and began experimenting with the material around 1860; it did, indeed, prove to be very difficult to discover how to handle it safely. In the 1860s, Nobel received several patents around the world for mixtures, devices, and manufacturing methods based on the explosive power of nitroglycerine, eventually leading to the invention of dynamite, ballistite, and gelignite from which he made a fortune. Although Nobel always acknowledged and honoured Sobrero as the man who had discovered nitroglycerine, Sobrero was dismayed by the uses to which the explosive had been put and claimed he was almost ashamed by his discovery.

== Works ==
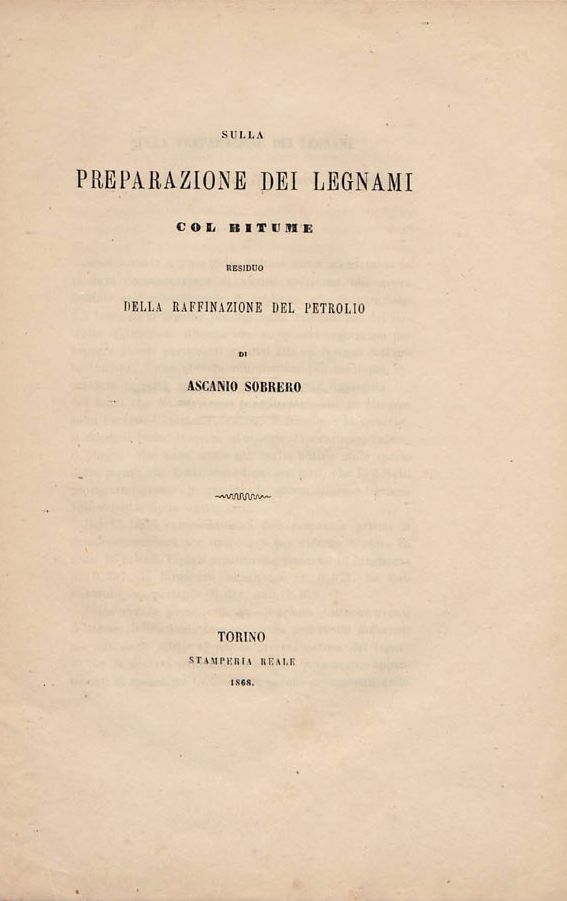
Sulla preparazione dei legnami col bitume residuo della raffinazione del petrolio, 1868

- Manuale di chimica applicata alle arti (in Italian). Vol. 1. Torino: Pomba. 1851.
- Manuale di chimica applicata alle arti (in Italian). Vol. 2. Torino: Pomba. 1853.
- Manuale di chimica applicata alle arti (in Italian). Vol. 3. Torino: UTET. 1856.
- Baroscopio o prenunziatore del tempo (in Italian). Torino: Camilla & Bertolero. 1864.
- Vetri e cristalli (in Italian). Torino: Dalmazzo. 1865.
- Manuale di chimica applicata alle arti (in Italian). Torino: UTET. 1866.
- Della cagione della malattia della vite e dei mezzi da usarsi per debellarla (in Italian). Torino: Stamperia reale. 1867.
- Sulla preparazione dei legnami col bitume residuo della raffinazione del petrolio (in Italian). Torino: Stamperia reale. 1868.
- Dei cementi magnesiaci (in Italian). Torino: Favale. 1869.
- Sul calcare bituminoso di Manopello (in Italian). Torino: Favale. 1869.
- Esame della foglia del gelso (in Italian). Torino: Stamperia reale. 1871.
- Della cagione della malattia del baco da seta (in Italian). Torino: Stamperia reale. 1871.
- Analisi delle calamine (in Italian). Torino: Stamperia reale. 1871.
- Conservazione dei legnami col mezzo del bitume residuo della raffinazione del petrolio (in Italian). Torino: Stamperia reale. 1871.
- Intorno alla malattia dominante del baco da seta (in Italian). Torino: Foa. 1872.
- Pensieri agronomici (in Italian). Torino: Camilla & Bertolero. 1873.
- Sopra un caso di fermentazione alcoolica (in Italian). Torino: Camilla & Bertolero. 1874.
- In un caso speciale di fermentazione alcoolica (in Italian). Torino: Paravia. 1874.
- Lezioni di chimica docimastica (in Italian). Torino: Loescher. 1877.
- Chimica orticola (in Italian). Torino: Stabilimento Artistico Letterario. 1883.
