= Ethylene glycol dinitrate =

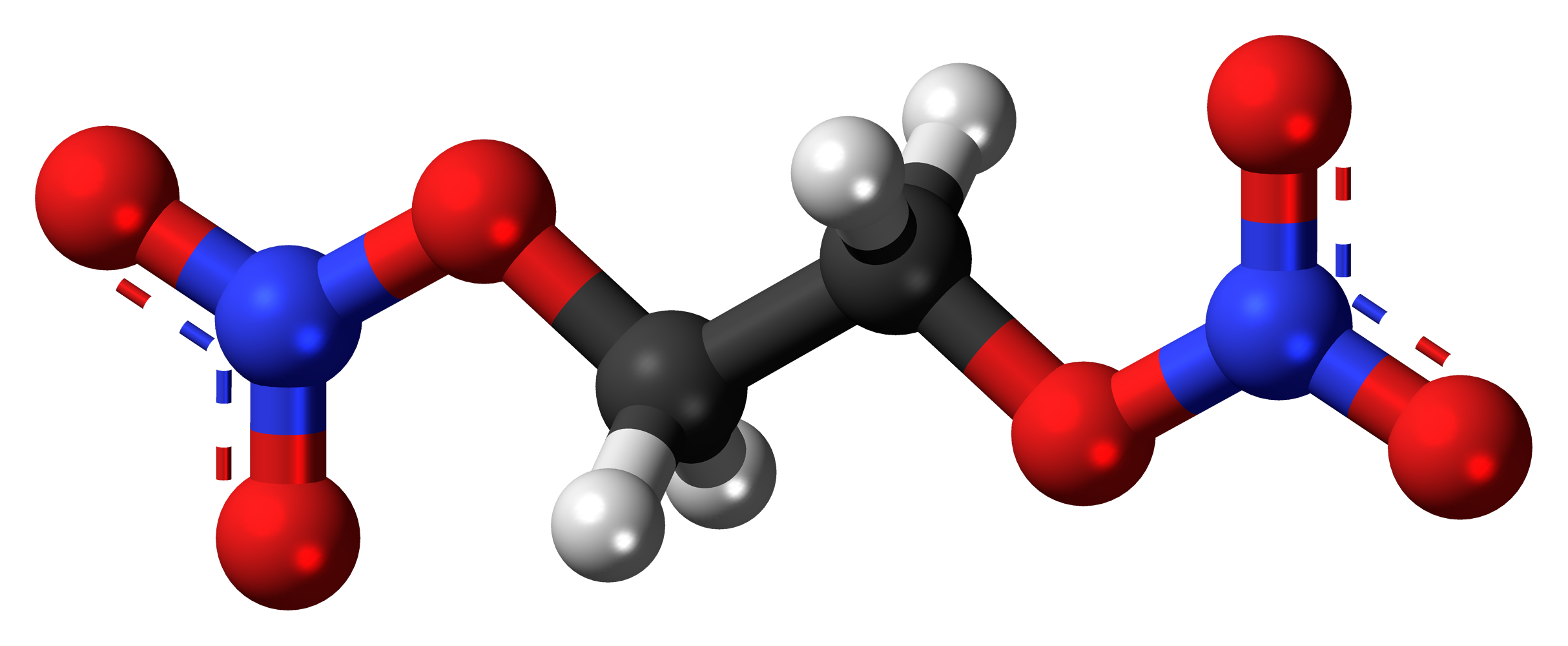

Names
- Preferred IUPAC name Ethane-1,2-diyl dinitrate
- Other names Ethylene glycol dinitrate, Glycol dinitrate, Ethylene dinitrate, Ethylene nitrate, 1,2-Bis(nitrooxy)ethane, Nitroglycol (NGc), 1,2-Ethanediol dinitrate, Dinitroglycol, EGDN, Ethane-1,2-diyl dinitrate

Identifiers
CAS Number	628-96-6
3D model (JSmol)	Interactive image; Interactive image
ChemSpider	37281
ECHA InfoCard	100.010.058
PubChem CID	40818
UNII	9CZ6PE9E3J
CompTox Dashboard (EPA)	DTXSID6027264
- InChI: InChI=1S/C2H4N2O6/c5-3(6)9-1-2-10-4(7)8/h1-2H2 Key: UQXKXGWGFRWILX-UHFFFAOYSA-N; InChI=1/C2H4N2O6/c5-3(6)9-1-2-10-4(7)8/h1-2H2
- SMILES: O=N(=O)OCCON(=O)=O; C(CO[N+](=O)[O-])O[N+](=O)[O-]

Properties
Chemical formula	C_{2}H_{4}N_{2}O_{6}
Molar mass	152.1 g/mol
Appearance	Oily, colorless to light yellow liquid
Odor	odorless
Density	1.4918 g/cm^{3}
Melting point	−22.0 °C (−7.6 °F; 251.2 K)
Boiling point	197.5 °C (387.5 °F; 470.6 K)
Solubility in water	5 g/L
log P	1.16
Vapor pressure	0.05 mmHg (@ 20 °C)
Refractive index (n_{D})	1.499 (15 °C)

Explosive data
Shock sensitivity	0.02 kp m = 0.2 Nm
Friction sensitivity	36 kp = 353 N pistil load no reaction
Detonation velocity	7300 m/s
RE factor	1.66

Hazards
- GHS labelling
Pictograms	(GHS01: Explosive) (GHS06: Toxic) (GHS08: Health hazard)
Signal word	Danger
Hazard statements	H200, H300, H310, H330, H373
Precautionary statements	P201, P202, P260, P262, P264, P270, P271, P280, P281, P284, P301+P316, P302+P352, P304+P340, P316, P319, P320, P321, P330, P361+P364, P372, P373, P380, P401, P403+P233, P405, P501
NFPA 704 (fire diamond)	2 1 4
Flash point	215 °C; 419 °F; 488 K
- NIOSH (US health exposure limits)
PEL (Permissible)	C 0.2 ppm (1 mg/m^{3}) [skin]
REL (Recommended)	ST 0.1 mg/m^{3} [skin]
IDLH (Immediate danger)	75 mg/m^{3}
- Except where otherwise noted, data are given for materials in their standard state (at 25 °C [77 °F], 100 kPa). verify (what is ?) Infobox references

Ethylene glycol dinitrate, abbreviated EGDN and NGC, also known as Nitroglycol, is a colorless, oily, explosive liquid obtained by nitrating ethylene glycol. It is similar to nitroglycerine in both manufacture and properties, though it is more volatile and less viscous. Unlike nitroglycerine, the chemical has a perfect oxygen balance, meaning that its ideal exothermic decomposition would completely convert it to low energy carbon dioxide, water, and nitrogen gas, with no excess unreacted substances, without needing to react with anything else.

== History and production ==
Pure EGDN was first produced by the Belgian chemist Louis Henry (1834–1913) in 1870 by dropping a small amount of ethylene glycol into a mixture of nitric and sulfuric acids cooled to 0 °C. The previous year, August Kekulé had produced EGDN by the nitration of ethylene, but this was actually contaminated with beta-nitroethyl nitrate.

Other investigators preparing NGC before publication in 1926 of Rinkenbach's work included: Champion (1871), Neff (1899) & Wieland & Sakellarios (1920), Dautriche, Hough & Oehme.

The American chemist William Henry Rinkenbach (1894–1965) prepared EGDN by nitrating purified glycol obtained by fractioning the commercial product under pressure of 40mm Hg, and at a temperature of 120°. For this 20g of middle fraction of purified glycol was gradually added to mixture of 70g nitric acid and 130g sulfuric acid, maintaining the temperature at 23°. The resulting 49g of crude product was washed with 300ml of water to obtain 39.6g of purified product. The low yield so obtained could be improved by maintaining a lower temperature and using a different nitrating acid mixture.

1. Direct Nitration of Glycol is carried out in exactly the same manner, with the same apparatus, and with the same mixed acids as nitration of glycerine. In the test nitration of anhydrous glycol (100g) with 625g of mixed acid HNO_{3} 40% & H_{2}SO_{4} 60% at 10-12°, the yield was 222g and it dropped to 218g when the temp was raised to 29-30°. When 500g of mixed acid HNO_{3} 50% & H_{2}SO_{4} 50% was used at 10-12°, the yield increased to 229g. In commercial nitration, the yields obtained from 100 kg anhydrous glycol and 625 kg of mixed acid containing HNO_{3} 41%, H_{2}SO_{4} 58% & water 1% were 222.2 kg of NGc at nitrating temp of 10-12° and only 218.3 kg at 29-30°. This means 90.6% of theory, as compared to 93.6% with NG.
  C_{2}H_{4}(OH)_{2} + 2 HNO_{3} → C_{2}H_{4}(ONO_{2})_{2} + 2 H_{2}O
  or through the reaction of ethylene oxide and dinitrogen pentoxide:
  C_{2}H_{4}O + N_{2}O_{5} → C_{2}H_{4}(ONO_{2})_{2}
2. Direct Production of NGc from Gaseous Ethylene.
3. Preparation of NGc from Ethylene Oxide.
4. Preparation of NGc by method of Messing from ethylene through chlorohydrin & ethylene oxide.
5. Preparation of NGc by duPont method.

== Properties ==
=== Physical properties ===
Ethylene glycol dinitrate is a colorless volatile liquid when in pure state, but is yellowish when impure.

Molar weight 152.07, N 18.42%, OB to CO_{2} 0%, OB to CO +21%; colorless volatile liquid when in pure state; yellowish liquid in crude state; sp gr 1.488 at 20/4° or 1.480 at 25°; n_D 1.4452 at 25° or 1.4472 at 20°; freezing point -22.75° (versus +13.1° for NG); frozen point given in is -22.3°; boiling point 199° at 760mm Hg (with decomposition).

Brisance by lead block compression (Hess crusher test) is 30.0 mm, versus 18.5 mm for NG and 16 mm for TNT (misleading, needs to give exact density and mass of explosive (25 or 50 g). Brisance by sand test, determined in mixtures with 40% kieselguhr, gave for NGc mixtures slightly higher results than with those containing NG.

=== Chemical properties ===
When ethylene glycol dinitrate is rapidly heated to 215 °C, it explodes; this is preceded by partial decomposition similar to that of nitroglycerin. EGDN has a slightly higher brisance than nitroglycerin.

Ethylene glycol dinitrate reacts violently with potassium hydroxide, yielding ethylene glycol and potassium nitrate:

C_{2}H_{2}(ONO_{2})_{2} + 2 KOH → C_{2}H_{2}(OH)_{2} + 2 KNO_{3}

== Other ==
EGDN was used in manufacturing explosives to lower the freezing point of nitroglycerin, in order to produce dynamite for use in colder weather. Due to its volatility, it was used as a detection taggant in some plastic explosives, e.g. Semtex, to allow more reliable explosive detection, until 1995 when it was replaced by dimethyldinitrobutane. It is considerably more stable than glyceryl trinitrate owing to the lack of secondary hydroxyl groups in the precursor polyol.

Like other organic nitrates, ethylene glycol dinitrate is a vasodilator.

== See also ==
- Methyl nitrate
- Erythritol tetranitrate
- Xylitol pentanitrate
- Mannitol hexanitrate
- RE factor
