= Mannitol hexanitrate =

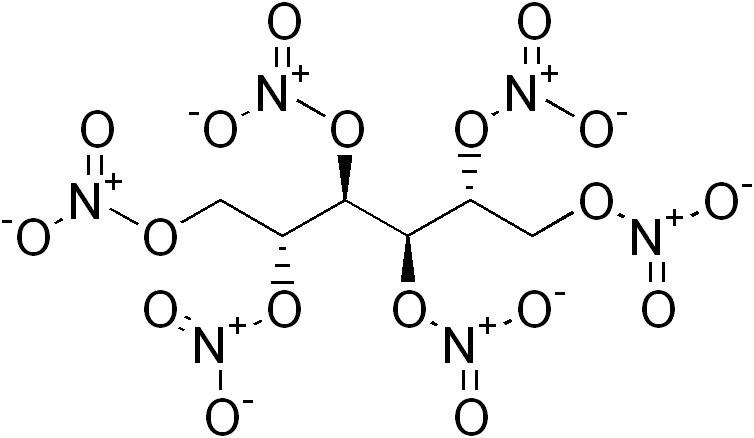

Names
- IUPAC name D-Mannitol hexanitrate
- Systematic IUPAC name (2R,3R,4R,5R)-Hexane-1,2,3,4,5,6-hexayl hexanitrate
- Other names Mannitol hexanitrate Nitromannite; Nitromannitol; Nitranitol; Mannitrin

Identifiers
CAS Number	15825-70-4
3D model (JSmol)	Interactive image
ChEMBL	ChEMBL2104740
ChemSpider	55696
ECHA InfoCard	100.036.280
EC Number	239-924-6
PubChem CID	61818
UNII	99AU28W1G9
CompTox Dashboard (EPA)	DTXSID8065953
- InChI: InChI=1S/C6H8N6O18/c13-7(14)25-1-3(27-9(17)18)5(29-11(21)22)6(30-12(23)24)4(28-10(19)20)2-26-8(15)16/h3-6H,1-2H2/t3-,4-,5-,6-/m1/s1 Key: DGMJZELBSFOPHH-KVTDHHQDSA-N; InChI=1/C6H8N6O18/c13-7(14)25-1-3(27-9(17)18)5(29-11(21)22)6(30-12(23)24)4(28-10(19)20)2-26-8(15)16/h3-6H,1-2H2/t3-,4-,5-,6-/m1/s1 Key: DGMJZELBSFOPHH-KVTDHHQDBN
- SMILES: C([C@H]([C@H]([C@@H]([C@@H](CO[N+](=O)[O-])O[N+](=O)[O-])O[N+](=O)[O-])O[N+](=O)[O-])O[N+](=O)[O-])O[N+](=O)[O-]

Properties
Chemical formula	C_{6}H_{8}N_{6}O_{18}
Molar mass	452.15 g/mol
Density	1.73 g/cm^{3}
Melting point	112 °C (234 °F; 385 K)
Solubility in water	insoluble

Explosive data
Shock sensitivity	more sensitive than PETN, slightly below the line separating primary and secondary explosives
Friction sensitivity	comparable to PETN
Detonation velocity	8260 m/s (@ 1.73 g/cm^{3})
RE factor	1.70
- Except where otherwise noted, data are given for materials in their standard state (at 25 °C [77 °F], 100 kPa). verify (what is ?) Infobox references

Mannitol hexanitrate is a powerful explosive. Physically, it is a powdery solid at normal temperature ranges, with density of 1.73 g/cm^{3}. The chemical name is hexanitromannitol and it is also known as nitromannite, MHN, and nitromannitol, and by the trademarks Nitranitol and Mannitrin. It is more stable than nitroglycerin, and it is used in detonators.

Mannitol hexanitrate is a secondary explosive formed by the nitration of mannitol, a sugar alcohol. The product is used in medicine as a vasodilator and as an explosive in blasting caps. Its sensitivity is high, particularly at high temperatures (> 75 °C) where it is slightly more sensitive than nitroglycerine. Nitromannite is a class B explosive.

The production of pure MHN is not a trivial task, since most preparations will yield a mixture of MHN and lower esters (pentanitrate and lower).

== See also ==
- Pentaerythritol tetranitrate (PETN)
- Xylitol pentanitrate
- Erythritol tetranitrate (ETN)
- Ethylene glycol dinitrate
- Methyl nitrate
