= Gelignite =

Explosive material

Gelignites

Gelignite (/ˈdʒɛlɪɡnaɪt/), also known as blasting gelatin or simply "jelly", is an explosive material consisting of collodion-cotton (a type of nitrocellulose or guncotton) dissolved in either nitroglycerine or nitroglycol and mixed with wood pulp and saltpetre (sodium nitrate or potassium nitrate).

It was invented in 1875 by Swedish chemist Alfred Nobel, who also invented dynamite. It is more stable than dynamite, but can still suffer from "sweating" or leaching out nitroglycerine. Its composition makes it easily moldable and safe to handle without protection, as long as it is not near anything capable of detonating it.

Considered one of the cheapest explosives, it burns slowly and cannot explode without a detonator. It can be stored safely as long as it does not sweat.

In the United Kingdom, an explosives certificate issued by the local Chief Officer of Police is required for possession of gelignite. Due to its widespread civilian use in quarries and mining, it has historically been used by rebel groups such as Mudiad Amddiffyn Cymru, the Provisional Irish Republican Army and the Ulster Volunteer Force, who often used gelignite as a booster.
