= 1,3,3-Trinitroazetidine =

Names
- Preferred IUPAC name 1,3,3-Trinitroazetidine
- Other names TNAZ

Identifiers
CAS Number	97645-24-4
3D model (JSmol)	Interactive image
ChemSpider	7969893
PubChem CID	9794126
UNII	41T9FAH22H
CompTox Dashboard (EPA)	DTXSID20913764
- InChI: InChI=1S/C3H4N4O6/c8-5(9)3(6(10)11)1-4(2-3)7(12)13/h1-2H2 Key: ZCRYIJDAHIGPDQ-UHFFFAOYSA-N
- SMILES: C1C(CN1[N+](=O)[O-])([N+](=O)[O-])[N+](=O)[O-]

Properties
Chemical formula	C_{3}H_{4}N_{4}O_{6}
Molar mass	192.087 g·mol^{−1}
Appearance	Pale yellow crystals
Density	1.86 g/cm^{3}
Melting point	101 °C (214 °F; 374 K)
Boiling point	252 °C (486 °F; 525 K)

Structure
Crystal structure	Orthorhombic

Explosive data
Detonation velocity	9597 m/s
- Except where otherwise noted, data are given for materials in their standard state (at 25 °C [77 °F], 100 kPa). (what is ?) Infobox references

1,3,3-Trinitroazetidine (TNAZ) is an explosive heterocyclic compound that has been considered as a potential replacement for TNT because of its low melting point (101 °C) and good thermal stability (up to 240 °C). TNAZ was first synthesized by Archibald et al. in 1990. Several synthesis routes are known, and bulk production of several hundred kilogram batches has been demonstrated at Los Alamos National Laboratory.

== Properties ==
The compound crystallizes in an orthorhombic lattice with the space group Pbca. Thermolysis occurs starting around 240 °C - 250 °C with decomposition products that include nitrogen dioxide, nitric oxide, nitrous acid, carbon dioxide, and formaldehyde. It has a heat of decomposition of 6343 kJ/kg, and a detonation pressure of 36.4 GPa.
