= William Murrell (physician) =

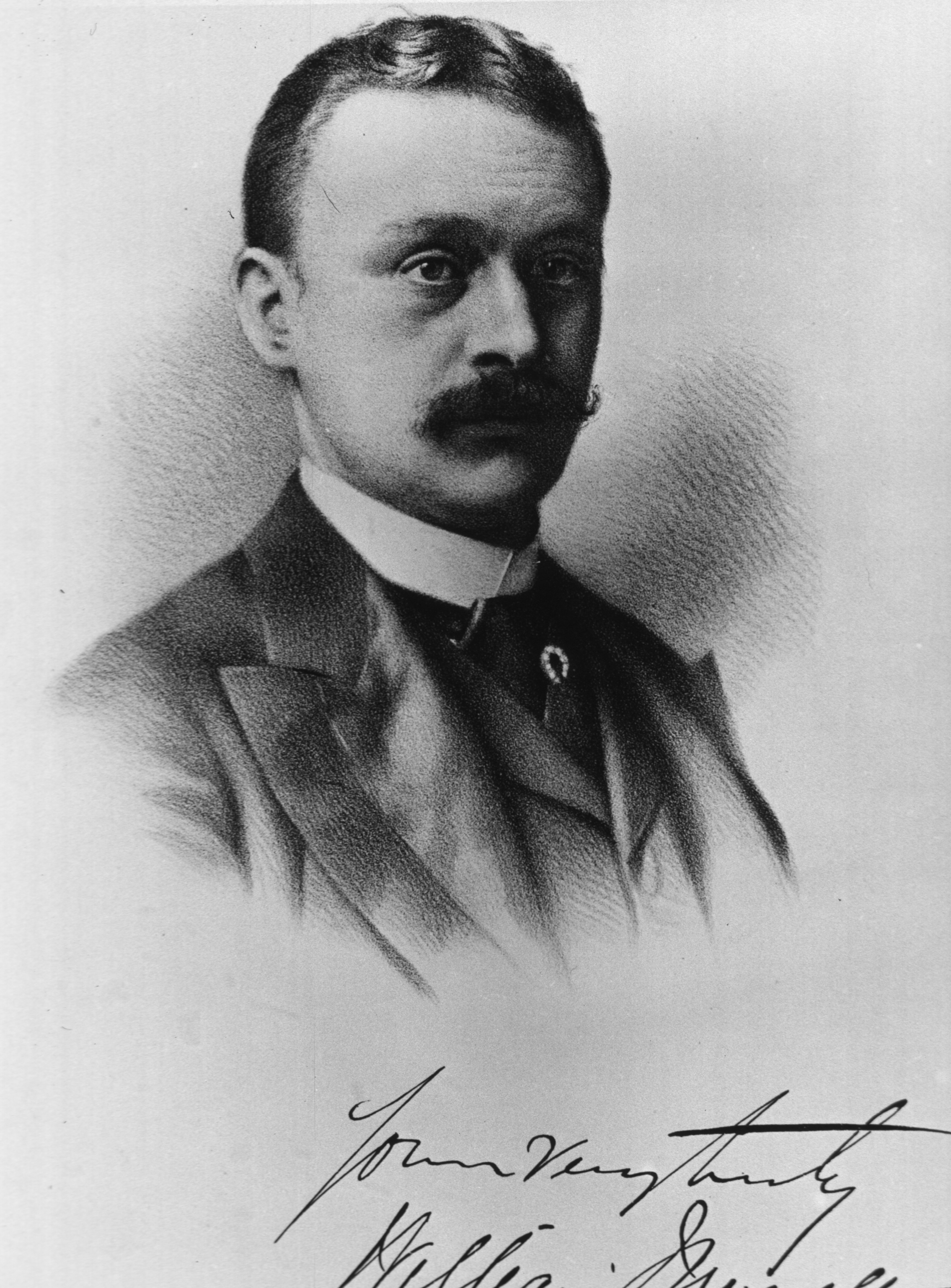
- Born: 26 November 1853; London, England
- Died: 28 June 1912 (aged 58); West End, London, England
- Education: University College London
- Awards: Fellow of the Royal College of Physicians
- Scientific career
- Fields: medicine, clinical pharmacology and toxicology
- Workplaces: Westminster Hospital Medical School and Paddington Green Children's Hospital

William Murrell (26 November 1853 – 28 June 1912) was an English physician, clinical pharmacologist, and toxicologist. Murrell is best known for being one of the first to recognize the clinical benefits of glyceryl trinitrate (also known as nitroglycerin) for the management of patients with angina pectoris.

== Early life and education ==
Murrell was born in London on 26 November 1853, the son of a lawyer. He was educated at Murray School in Wimbledon and University College in London. He trained at the University College and Brompton hospitals. At the University College hospital he taught physiology. He qualified for membership in the Royal College of Surgeons of England and Royal College of Physicians in 1877. The MD was granted by the University of Brussels in 1879.

== Personality ==
Edith Smith, a graduate student of Murrell, describes him as a quiet, polite, considerate and unassuming man. Smith stated that Murrell was always pleasant to the nursing staff, however, he commanded respect in a quiet manner and expected the nursing staff to adequately prepare the patients for his visits.

== Nitroglycerin and angina pectoris ==
Murrell's administration of nitroglycerin to patients with angina pectoris was documented in the article "Nitro-glycerine as a remedy for angina pectoris," published in 1879. The article describes a case series of patients which benefited from the administration of the drug. He also describes in detail the effects of nitroglycerin experienced by testing the drug on himself. Ironically, Alfred Nobel, the inventor of Nitroglycerin for use as an explosive, received nitroglycerin for treatment of angina.

== Other work ==
Some of the other research interests of William Murrell included the treatment of chronic bronchitis, treatment of arthritis, forensic medicine, and toxicology.
