= Tetranitratoxycarbon =

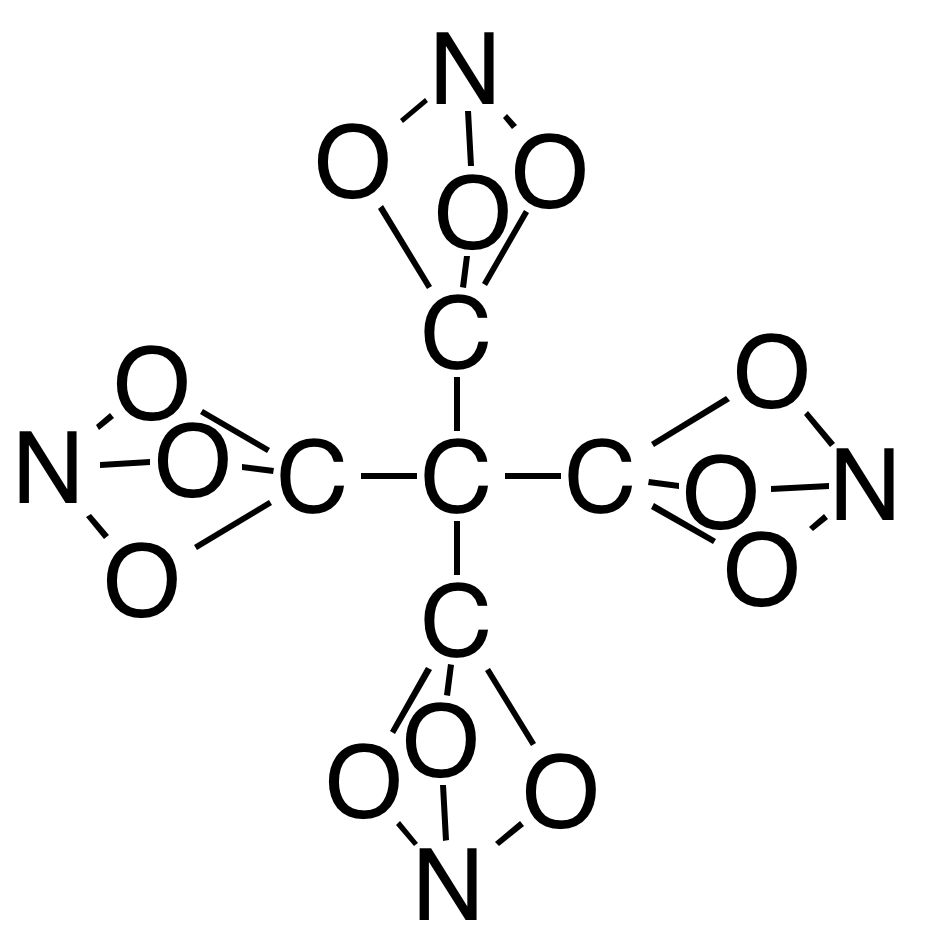

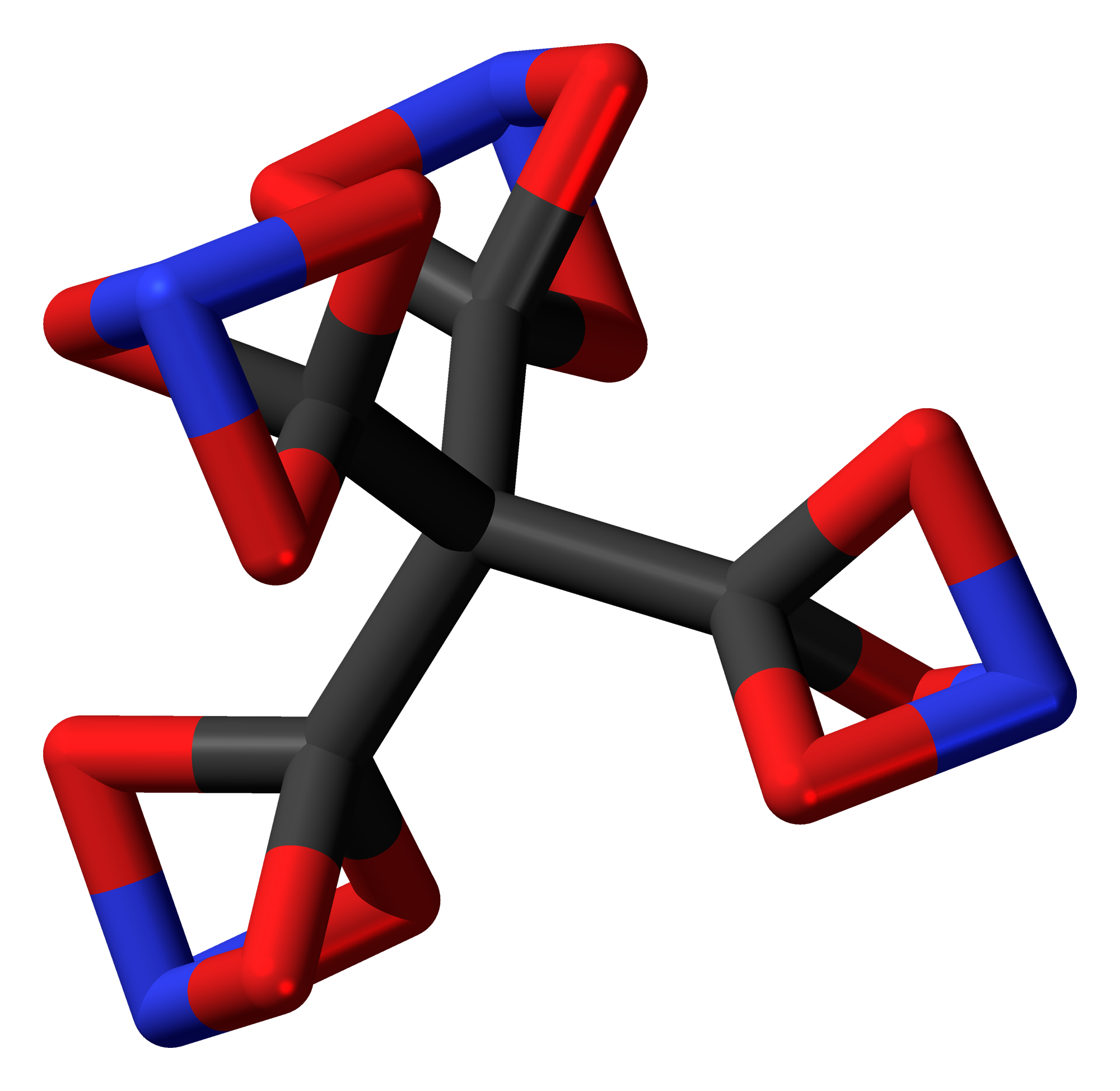
- Carbon Oxygen Nitrogen

Names
- Preferred IUPAC name 3,3′,3′′,3′′′-Methanetetrayltetra(2,4,5-trioxa-1-azabicyclo[1.1.1]pentane)
- Other names: Tetra(nitrato-O,O,O -methyl)methane; Tetrakis(nitratoxycarbon)methane; 3,3',3'',3'''-Methanetrayltetrayltetrakis-2,4,5-trioxa-1-azabicyclo[1.1.1]pentane; CLL-1

Identifiers
| CAS Number | 1400582-42-4 |
| 3D model (JSmol) | Interactive image |
| ChemSpider | 128912438 |
| PubChem CID | 102449643 |
| CompTox Dashboard (EPA) | DTXSID401336183 |
- InChI: InChI=1S/C5N4O12/c10-2(11-6(10)12-2)1(3-13-7(14-3)15-3,4-16-8(17-4)18-4)5-19-9(20-5)21-5 Key: DIVJHHZLRGLYFL-UHFFFAOYSA-N
- SMILES: N(O1)(O2)OC12C(C(O1)(O2)ON12)(C(O1)(O2)ON12)C(O1)(O2)ON12

Properties
| Chemical formula | C_{5}N_{4}O_{12} |
| Molar mass | 308.071 g·mol^{−1} |
| Density | 1.87 g/cm^{3} (predicted) |
- Except where otherwise noted, data are given for materials in their standard state (at 25 °C [77 °F], 100 kPa). Infobox references

Tetranitratoxycarbon, systematic name tetra(nitrato-O,O,O-methyl)methane (often shortened to tetrakis(nitratoxycarbon)methane), is a hypothetical molecule that was proposed by Clara Lazen, a fifth-grader in Kansas City, Missouri, who conceived of its structure and built a model in 2012. She is credited as co-author of a scientific paper on the molecule, which uses computational chemistry to predict that the molecule could actually exist.

== Prediction ==
Science teacher Kenneth Boehr was using ball-and-stick models to represent simple molecules during a fifth-grade class, when ten-year-old Clara Lazen assembled a complex model and asked whether it was a real molecule. It is unclear if Lazen randomly or deliberately assembled this particular molecule.

Unsure if the molecule existed, Boehr sent a picture of the model to a chemist friend, Robert Zoellner at Humboldt State University. Zoellner checked the molecule against the Chemical Abstracts database and confirmed that Lazen's model was of a structural type that had not been reported before.

Zoellner wrote a paper on the molecule, published in Computational and Theoretical Chemistry, crediting Lazen and Boehr as co-authors.

== Properties ==
Tetranitratoxycarbon consists of oxygen, nitrogen, and carbon, with molecular structure C(CO_{3}N)_{4}. Its oxygen-rich formula, in particular, a positive oxygen balance, means it does not require any external oxidizer to undergo complete oxidation, and may thus have explosive or other high-energy properties. However, it is expected to be too thermally unstable for practical use.

The nitratoxycarbon functional group itself—a carbon atom and a nitrogen atom linked by three oxygen-atom bridges—has yet to be observed in any chemical compound. Computational chemistry studies indicate that it is only metastable, with other structural isomers such as the carboxylic nitroso-ester (C(=O)ONO) being more stable. As such this functional group is likely to remain purely hypothetical and no method for its synthesis has yet been proposed. Compounds containing the general connective motif of two atoms connected by three one-atom linkers have been synthesized, including the all-carbon bicyclo[1.1.1]pentane and derivatives thereof, and several other elemental analogs have been mentioned in patents.
