= 1,3,5-Triazido-2,4,6-trinitrobenzene =

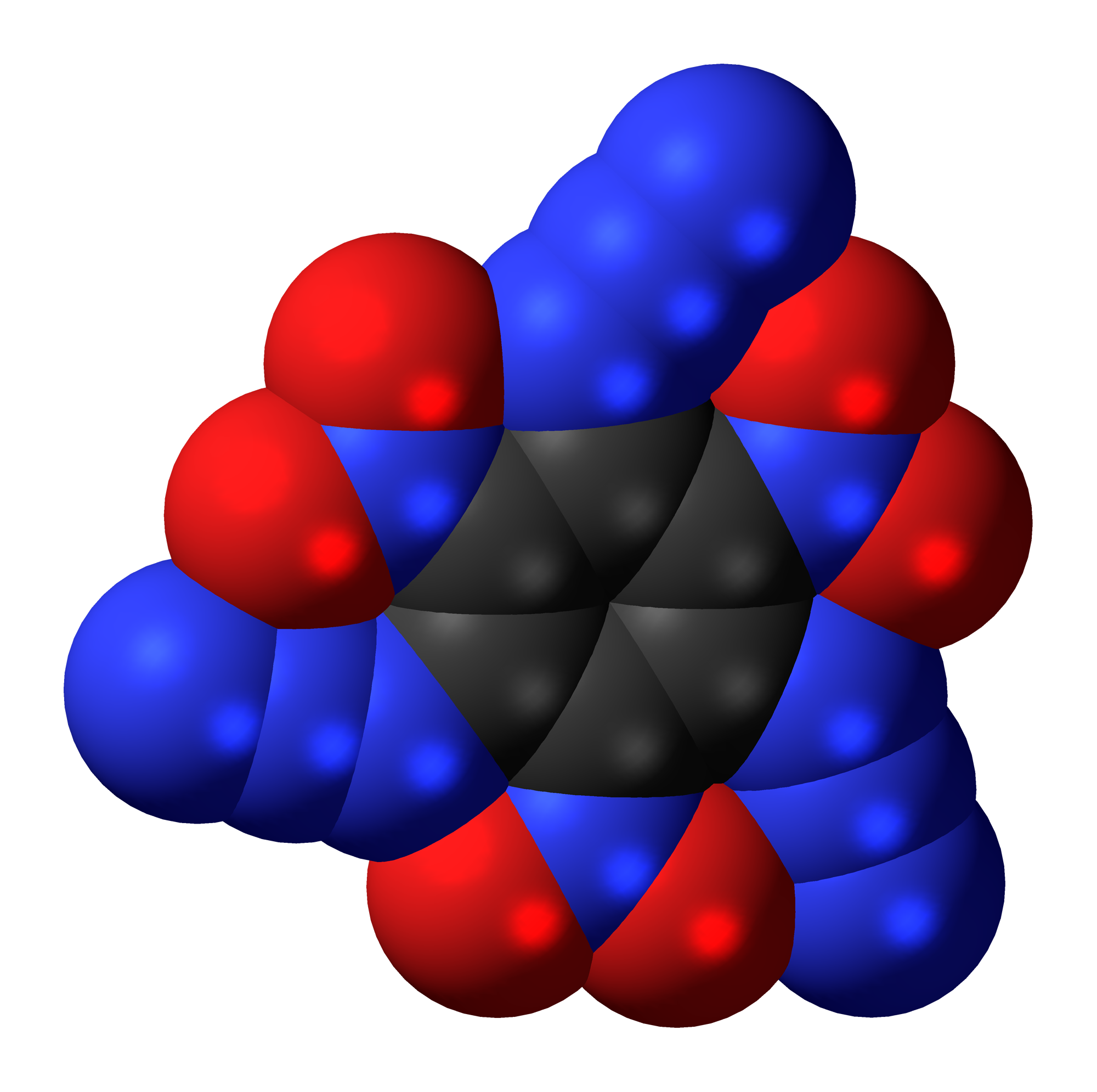

Names
- Preferred IUPAC name 1,3,5-Triazido-2,4,6-trinitrobenzene

Identifiers
CAS Number	29306-57-8
3D model (JSmol)	Interactive image; Interactive image
Abbreviations	TATNB
ChemSpider	56578
MeSH	C043826
PubChem CID	62844
UNII	25NHL6Y97G
CompTox Dashboard (EPA)	DTXSID30183552
- InChI: InChI=1S/C6N12O6/c7-13-10-1-4(16(19)20)2(11-14-8)6(18(23)24)3(12-15-9)5(1)17(21)22 Key: LIPDUIOSIFXENT-UHFFFAOYSA-N; InChI=1/C6N12O6/c7-13-10-1-4(16(19)20)2(11-14-8)6(18(23)24)3(12-15-9)5(1)17(21)22 Key: LIPDUIOSIFXENT-UHFFFAOYAO
- SMILES: O=[N+](c1c(N=[N+]=[N-])c([N+]([O-])=O)c(N=[N+]=[N-])c([N+]([O-])=O)c1N=[N+]=[N-])[O-]; c1(c(c(c(c(c1[N+](=O)[O-])N=[N+]=[N-])[N+](=O)[O-])N=[N+]=[N-])[N+](=O)[O-])N=[N+]=[N-]

Properties
Chemical formula	C_{6}N_{12}O_{6}
Molar mass	336.144 g·mol^{−1}
Appearance	yellow crystals
Melting point	131 °C

Structure
Crystal structure	monoclinic
Space group	P2_{1}/c, No. 14

Thermochemistry
Std enthalpy of formation (Δ_{f}H^{⦵}_{298})	765.8 kJ/mol
Std enthalpy of combustion (Δ_{c}H^{⦵}_{298})	3200 kJ/mol

Explosive data
Detonation velocity	7350 m/s
- Except where otherwise noted, data are given for materials in their standard state (at 25 °C [77 °F], 100 kPa). verify (what is ?) Infobox references

1,3,5-Triazido-2,4,6-trinitrobenzene, also known as TATNB (triazidotrinitrobenzene) and TNTAZB (trinitrotriazidobenzene), is an aromatic high explosive composed of a benzene ring with three azido groups (-N_{3}) and three nitro groups (-NO_{2}) alternating around the ring, giving the chemical formula C_{6}(N_{3})_{3}(NO_{2})_{3}. Its detonation velocity is 7,350 meters per second, which is comparable to TATB (triaminotrinitrobenzene).

== Preparation ==
The compound was first synthesized in 1924 by Oldřich Turek. It can be prepared by the reaction of 1,3,5-trichloro-2,4,6-trinitrobenzene with sodium azide. 1,3,5-trichloro-2,4,6-trinitrobenzene is obtained from the nitration of 1,3,5-trichlorobenzene with nitric acid and sulfuric acid.

Another route uses the nitration of 1,3,5-triazido-2,4-dinitrobenzene.

== Properties ==
=== Chemical Properties ===
Even at low temperatures, the compound slowly decomposes by giving off nitrogen gas, converting into benzotrifuroxan. This reaction proceeds quantitatively within 14 hours at 100 °C. As a solution in m-xylene, first order kinetics were observed for the decomposition, with a half-life of 340 minutes at 70 °C, 89 minutes at 80 °C, and 900 seconds at 100 °C.

The compound explodes if rapidly heated above 168 °C.
