= Xylitol pentacetate =

Names
- IUPAC name [(2S,4R)-2,3,4,5-tetraacetyloxypentyl] acetate
- Other names [(2S,4R)-2,3,4,5-Tetraacetyloxypentyl] acetate D-Ribitol pentaacetate 1,2,3,4,5-penta-O-acetyl ribitol

Identifiers
CAS Number	13437-68-8
3D model (JSmol)	Interactive image
ChemSpider	20000346
PubChem CID	12939086
- InChI: InChI=1S/C15H22O10/c1-8(16)21-6-13(23-10(3)18)15(25-12(5)20)14(24-11(4)19)7-22-9(2)17/h13-15H,6-7H2,1-5H3/t13-,14+,15? Key: NVKPIAUSOPISJK-YIONKMFJSA-N
- SMILES: CC(=O)OC[C@H](C([C@H](COC(=O)C)OC(=O)C)OC(=O)C)OC(=O)C

Properties
Chemical formula	C_{15}H_{22}O_{10}
Molar mass	362.331 g·mol^{−1}
Solubility in water	Soluble in water
Solubility	Soluble in methanol
- Except where otherwise noted, data are given for materials in their standard state (at 25 °C [77 °F], 100 kPa). Infobox references

Xylitol pentacetate is an organic compound with the formula C_{15}H_{22}O_{10}. It is an acetylated sugar alcohol that is used as an intermediary in the production of xylitol pentanitrate. It is also commonly made to isolate and identify xylitol from complex organic mixtures.

== Synthesis ==
Xylitol pentacetate is made by the addition of acetic anhydride and sodium acetate to xylitol.
