= Oxygen balance =

Degree to which an explosive can be oxidized

Oxygen balance (OB, OB%, or Ω) is an expression that is used to indicate the degree to which an explosive can be oxidized, to determine whether the molecules of explosive substance or mixture contains enough oxygen to fully oxidize the other atoms in the molecules. For example, fully oxidized carbon forms carbon dioxide, hydrogen forms water, sulfur forms sulfur dioxide, and metals form metal oxides. A molecule is said to have a positive oxygen balance if it contains more oxygen than is needed and a negative oxygen balance if it contains less oxygen than is needed.

An explosive with a negative oxygen balance will lead to incomplete combustion, which commonly produces carbon monoxide, which is a toxic gas. Explosives with negative or positive oxygen balance are commonly mixed with other energetic materials that are either oxygen positive or negative, respectively, to increase the explosive's power. For example, TNT is an oxygen negative explosive and is commonly mixed with oxygen positive energetic materials or fuels to increase its power.

Detonating a mixture of TNT (trinitrotoluene) and RDX (cyclotrimethylenetrinitramine), with its negative oxygen balance, in a closed chamber produces 5-nm detonation nanodiamonds.

== Calculating oxygen balance ==
The procedure for calculating oxygen balance in terms of 100 grams of the explosive material is to determine the number of moles of oxygen that are excess or deficient for 100 grams of the compound.

$\text{OB}\% = \frac{-1600}{\text{Mol. wt. of compound}} \times (2X + Y/2 + M - Z)$

X = number of atoms of carbon, Y = number of atoms of hydrogen, Z = number of atoms of oxygen, and M = number of atoms of metal (metallic oxide produced).

In the case of TNT (C_{6}H_{2}(NO_{2})_{3}CH_{3}),

Molecular weight = 227.1

X = 7 (number of carbon atoms)

Y = 5 (number of hydrogen atoms)

Z = 6 (number of oxygen atoms)

Therefore,

$$\text{OB}\% = \frac{-1600}{227.1} \times (14 + 2.5 - 6)$$
OB% = −73.97% for TNT

Examples of materials with negative oxygen balance are nitromethane (−39%), trinitrotoluene (−74%), aluminium powder (−89%), sulfur (−100%), or carbon (−266.7%). Examples of materials with positive oxygen balance are ammonium nitrate (+20%), ammonium perchlorate (+34%), potassium chlorate (+39.2%), sodium chlorate (+45%), potassium nitrate (+47.5%), tetranitromethane (+49%), lithium perchlorate (+60%), or nitroglycerine (+3.5%). Ethylene glycol dinitrate has an oxygen balance of zero, as does the theoretical compound trinitrotriazine.

== Oxygen balance and power ==
Because sensitivity, brisance, and strength are properties resulting from a complex explosive chemical reaction, a simple relationship such as oxygen balance cannot be depended upon to yield universally consistent results. When using oxygen balance to predict properties of one explosive relative to another, it is to be expected that one with an oxygen balance closer to zero will be the more brisant, powerful, and sensitive; however, many exceptions to this rule do exist.

One area in which oxygen balance can be applied is in the processing of mixtures of explosives. The family of explosives called amatols are mixtures of ammonium nitrate and TNT. Ammonium nitrate has an oxygen balance of +20% and TNT has an oxygen balance of −74%, so it would appear that the mixture yielding an oxygen balance of zero would also result in the best explosive properties. In actual practice a mixture of 80% ammonium nitrate and 20% TNT by weight yields an oxygen balance of +1%, the best properties of all mixtures, and an increase in strength of 30% over TNT.

== See also ==
- Air–fuel ratio (rich and lean)
- Oxidizing and reducing flames
