= Methyl nitrate =

- Methyl nitrate

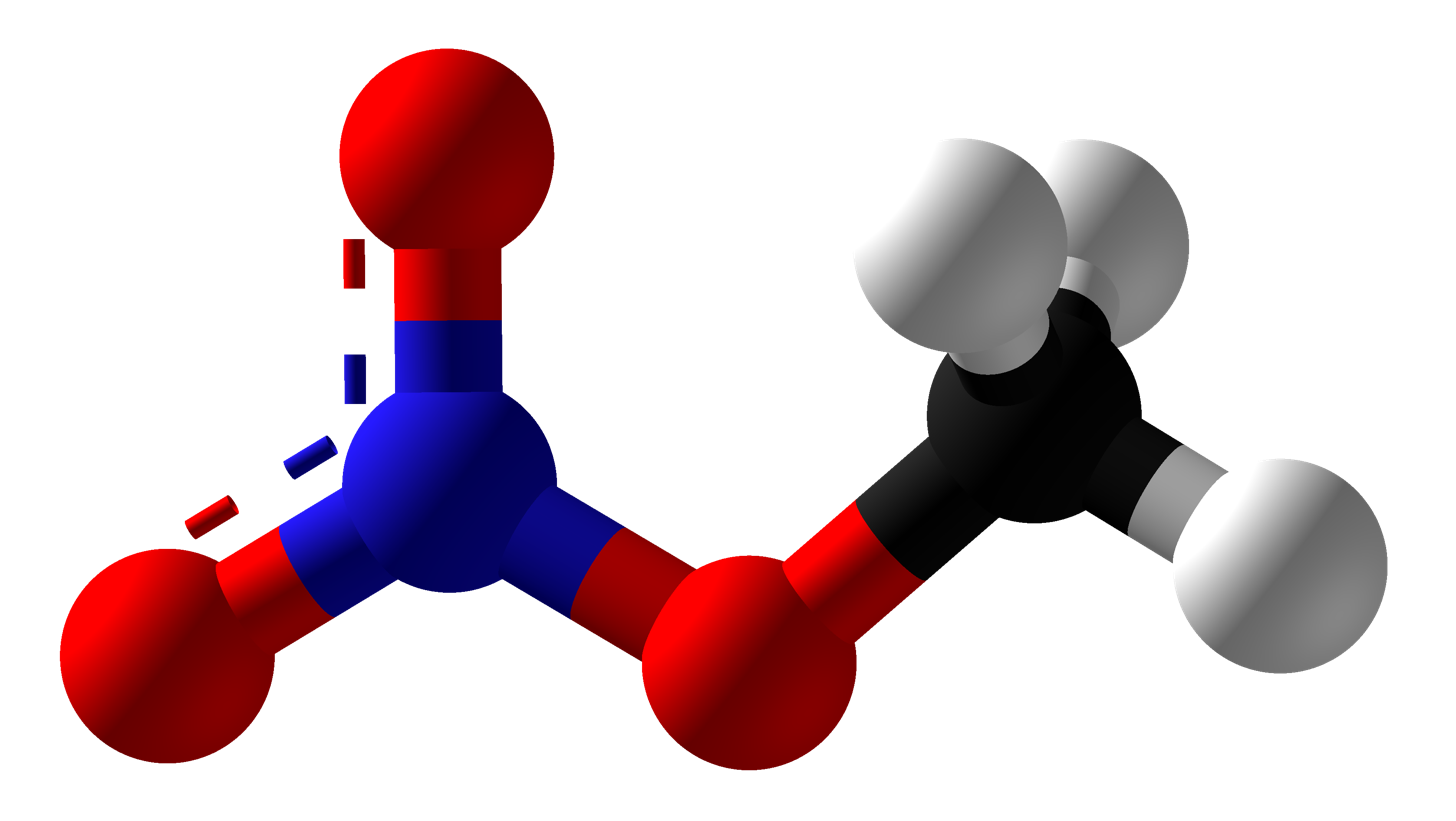

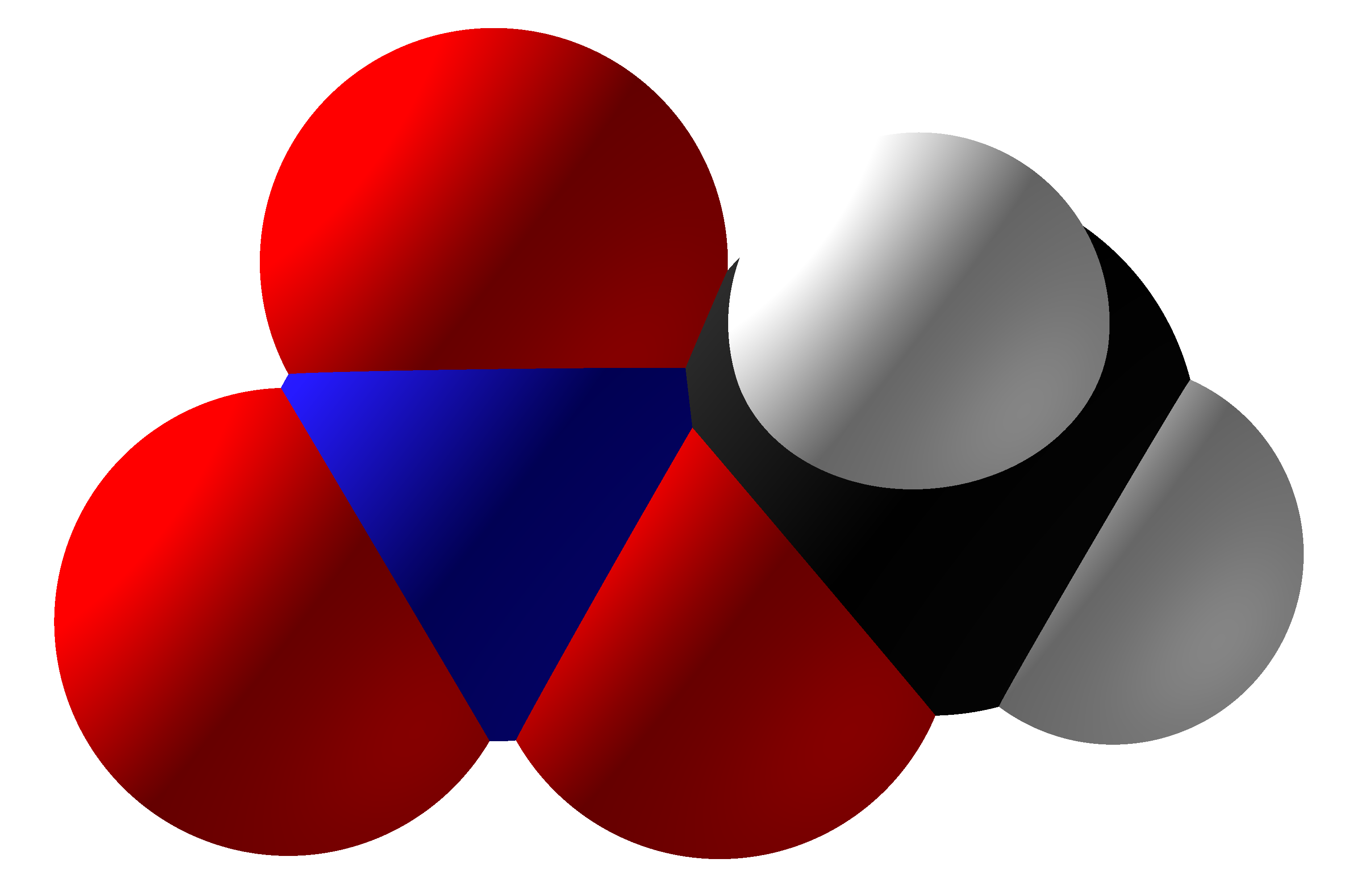

Names
- IUPAC name Methyl nitrate
- Other names nitric acid methyl ester, nitrooxymethane

Identifiers
CAS Number	598-58-3
3D model (JSmol)	Interactive image
ChemSpider	11231
ECHA InfoCard	100.009.039
PubChem CID	11724
UNII	LAD9RT85ES
CompTox Dashboard (EPA)	DTXSID4073205
- InChI: InChI=1S/CH3NO3/c1-5-2(3)4/h1H3 Key: LRMHVVPPGGOAJQ-UHFFFAOYSA-N; InChI=1/CH3NO3/c1-5-2(3)4/h1H3 Key: LRMHVVPPGGOAJQ-UHFFFAOYAP
- SMILES: [O-][N+](=O)OC

Properties
Chemical formula	CH_{3}NO_{3}
Molar mass	77.039 g·mol^{−1}
Appearance	Liquid
Density	1.203 g/cm^{3}, liquid
Melting point	−82.3 °C (−116.1 °F; 190.8 K)
Boiling point	64.6 °C (148.3 °F; 337.8 K) (explodes)

Explosive data
Shock sensitivity	High
Friction sensitivity	High
Detonation velocity	6300 m/s at ρ=1.217 g/cm^{3}

Hazards
- Occupational safety and health (OHS/OSH)
Main hazards	Toxic, High Explosive
- Lethal dose or concentration (LD, LC)
LC_{50} (median concentration)	1275 ppm (rat, 4h)
- Except where otherwise noted, data are given for materials in their standard state (at 25 °C [77 °F], 100 kPa). verify (what is ?) Infobox references

Methyl nitrate is the methyl ester of nitric acid and has the chemical formula CH_{3}NO_{3}. It is a colourless explosive volatile liquid.

== Synthesis ==
It can be produced by the condensation of nitric acid and methanol:

CH_{3}OH + HNO_{3} → CH_{3}NO_{3} + H_{2}O

Methyl nitrate can be produced on a laboratory or industrial scale either through the distillation of a mixture of methanol and nitric acid, or by the nitration of methanol by a mixture of sulfuric and nitric acids. The first procedure is not preferred due to the great explosion danger presented by the methyl nitrate vapour. The second procedure is essentially identical to that of making nitroglycerin. However, the process is usually run at a slightly higher temperature and the mixture is stirred mechanically on an industrial scale instead of with compressed air.

A newer method uses methyl iodide and silver nitrate:

CH_{3}I + AgNO_{3} → CH_{3}NO_{3} + AgI

Electrolytic production methods have been reported involving electrolyzing sodium acetate and sodium nitrate in acetic acid.

Methyl nitrate is also the product of the oxidation of some organic compounds in the presence of nitrogen oxides and chlorine, namely chloroethane or di-tert-butyl ether, while also producing nitromethane. Oxidation of nitromethane using nitrogen dioxide in an inert atmosphere can also yield methyl nitrate.

== Explosive properties ==
Methyl nitrate is a sensitive explosive. When ignited it burns extremely fiercely with a gray-blue flame. Methyl nitrate is a very strong explosive with a detonation velocity of 6,300 m/s, like nitroglycerin, ethylene glycol dinitrate, and other nitrate esters. The sensitivity of methyl nitrate to initiation by detonation is among the greatest known, with even a number one blasting cap, the lowest power available, producing a near full detonation of the explosive.

Despite the superior explosive properties of methyl nitrate, it has not received application as an explosive due mostly to its high volatility, which prevents it from being stored or handled safely.

== Safety ==
As well as being an explosive, methyl nitrate is toxic and causes headaches when inhaled.

== History ==
Methyl nitrate has not received much attention as an explosive, but as a mixture containing 25% methanol it was used as rocket fuel and volumetric explosive under the name Myrol in Nazi Germany during World War II. This mixture would evaporate at a constant rate and so its composition would not change over time. It presents a slight explosive danger (it is somewhat difficult to detonate) and does not detonate easily via shock.

According to A. Stettbacher, the substance was used as a combustible during the Reichstag fire in 1933.

Gartz shows in a recent work that only methyl nitrate with its production and explosion potential can represent the famous and mysterious Schießwasser ("shooting water") from the German Feuerwerkbuch ("fireworks book") of about 1420 (the oldest technical text in German language). The Feuerwerkbuch describes it as follows (written in Early New High German):

Wilt du mit wasser schiessen
das du denne kain puluer brvchest
vnd stercker vnd wyter mit schüssest
denne ob du das best puluer hettest
das ye gemachet ward so
nyme salpeter vnd distillier das zu wasser
vnd den swebel zu öl
vnd salarmoniack ouch zu wasser
vnd nym oleum benedictum ouch darzu
näch gewichte als du wol hören wirst
vnd wenn du das wasser zusammen bringen machst
so nym sechß tail salpeterwassers
zway tail swebelöls
zway tail salarmoniakwasser
zway tail de oleo benedicto
vnd lad die büchß vast wol
mit clotz vnd mit stain vnd güß
die wasser in die büchs
ain zechen tail des rors
hinder dem clotzen
vnd zünd si an mit zunder das
du dauon kommen mügest vnd lug
das die büchß vast starck sy
vnd mit disem wasser schüssest du
mit ain gemainer buchß
ob drwtusent schrytt wytt
es ist aber gar kostlichen.

Translation:

If you want to shoot with water,
so that you need no powder
and blast farther and wider
than if you had the best powder
that anyone had ever made, then
take saltpeter and distill it with water,
add sulfur to oil,
sal ammoniac to water,
and you'll need chrism oil there, too,
in careful proportions seen below.
And when you bring it all together,
take six parts saltpeter water,
two parts sulfur oil,
two parts sal ammoniac water
and two parts chrism.
Load the gun tight and well,
with bricks and stones; and pour
the water in the gun,
a tenth of the barrel,
behind the bricks;
and light it with tinder so that
you may escape the blast — ensure
the gun is fastened strong.
With this water you shall shoot
in a common gun
perhaps three thousand paces far.
It is a veritable delight.

== Structure ==
The structure of methyl nitrate has been studied experimentally in the gas phase (combined gas-electron diffraction and microwave spectroscopy, GED/MW) and in the crystalline state (X-ray diffraction, XRD) (see Table 1).

Gas phase structure of methyl nitrate determined by gas electron diffraction

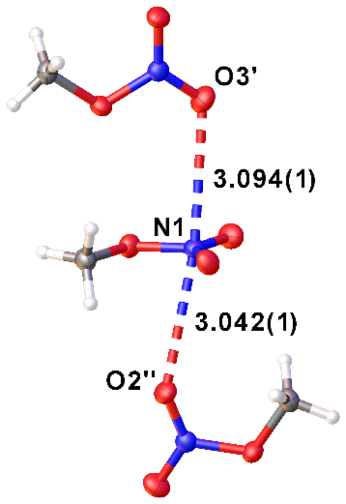
Solid-state structure of methyl nitrate determined by X-ray diffraction

In the solid state there are weak interactions between the O and N atoms of different molecules (see figure).

Table 1: Structural parameters of methyl nitrate Bond lengths in Å, angles in °
Parameter		
	XRD	GED/MW
C–O	1.451(1)	1.425(3)
N–OC	1.388(1)	1.403(2)
N–O_{terminal}	1.204(1)	1.205(1)
C–O–N	113.3(1)	113.6(3)
O_{terminal}-N-O_{terminal}	128.6(1)	131.4(4)

== See also ==
- Nitromethane
