= Nitrate ester =

Chemical group (–ONO2)

In organic chemistry, a nitrate ester is an organic functional group with the formula R−ONO_{2}, where R stands for any organyl group. They are the esters of nitric acid and alcohols. A well-known example is nitroglycerin, which is not a nitro compound, despite the "nitro" in its name.

Pentaerythritol tetranitrate is a commercially important explosive that contains four nitrate ester groups.

== Synthesis and reactions ==
Nitrate esters are typically prepared by condensation of nitric acid and the alcohol: For example, the simplest nitrate ester, methyl nitrate, is formed by reaction of methanol and nitric acid in the presence of sulfuric acid:

$$\ce{CH3OH  +  HNO3 -> CH3ONO2  +  H2O}$$

Formation of a nitrate ester is called a nitrooxylation (less commonly, nitroxylation).

Most commonly, "mixed acid" (nitric and sulfuric acids) are used, but in the 1980s production of the nitrocellulose with magnesium nitrate as a dehydrating agent was started in the US. In laboratory, phosphoric acid and phosphorus pentoxide or acetic acid and its anhydride may be used for the same purpose, or the nitroxylation can be conducted in anhydrous conditions (such as dichloromethane or chloroform).

== Explosive properties ==
The thermal decomposition of nitrate esters mainly yields the gases molecular nitrogen (N_{2}) and carbon dioxide. The considerable chemical energy of the detonation is due to the high strength of the bond in molecular nitrogen. This stoichiometry is illustrated by the equation for the detonation of nitroglycerin.

Illustrative of the highly sensitive nature of some organic nitrates is Si(CH_{2}ONO_{2})_{4}. A single crystal of this compound detonates even upon contact with a teflon spatula and in fact made full characterization impossible. Another contributor to its exothermic decomposition (inferred from much safer in silico experimentation) is the ability of silicon in its crystal phase to coordinate to two oxygen nitrito groups in addition to regular coordination to the four carbon atoms. This additional coordination would make formation of silicon dioxide (one of the decomposition products) more facile.

== Medical use ==
The nitrate esters isosorbide dinitrate (Isordil) and isosorbide mononitrate (Imdur, Ismo, Monoket, Mononitron) are converted in the body to nitric oxide, a potent natural vasodilator. In medicine, these esters are used as a medicine for angina pectoris (ischemic heart disease).

== Related compounds ==
Acetyl nitrate is a nitrate anhydride, being derived from the condensation of nitric and acetic acids.

== Atmospheric occurrence ==
=== Atmospheric abundance ===
Alkyl nitrates (RONO_{2}) compounds are widespread in the boundary layer, accounting for a large portion of total reactive nitrogen oxides in both urban and rural environments and across various hydrocarbon mixtures. In addition, alkyl nitrates are typically complex, multifunctional molecules that are still challenging to detect using chromatographic methods at the concentrations found under ambient conditions. Alkyl nitrates have been found to contribute to the NO_{y} compound budget. In total, 43 (C_{6}–C_{13}) alkyl mononitrates, 24 (C_{3}–C_{6}) alkyl dinitrates, and 19 (C_{2}–C_{6}) hydroxy alkyl nitrates were identified. In the urban air samples, the summed concentrations of 15 (C_{6}–C_{10}) alkyl mononitrates ranged from 2.9 to 11.0 pptv. The total levels of 21 (C_{3}–C_{6}) alkyl dinitrates were between 2.3 and 10.5 pptv, and the sum of 7 (C_{2}–C_{4}) hydroxy alkyl nitrates ranged from 7.3 to 28 pptv. These findings indicate that alkyl dinitrates, hydroxy alkyl nitrates, and alkyl mononitrates make an important contribution to the NO_{y} compound budget. Moreover, no significant differences in either the concentrations or patterns of organic nitrates were observed between the urban air of cities. Organic nitrates, however, occur at comparatively low concentrations. Short-chain alkyl nitrates (C_{4}–C_{6}) exhibit mixing ratios of about 0.2–2.5 pptv, with a pronounced minimum in the tropics and much lower levels in the Southern Hemisphere. For the longer and more functionalized species, the summed mixing ratio of 36 long-chain alkyl mononitrates (C_{7}–C_{13}) lies between 0.02 and 0.43 pptv, that of 23 alkyl dinitrates (C_{3}–C_{6}) ranges from 0.005 to 1.08 pptv, and that of 7 hydroxy alkyl nitrates (C_{2}–C_{4}) ranges from 0.005 to 1.07 pptv.

Alkyl nitrates abundance (pptv) in variant geographic regions
	Urban area	Marine air
Alkyl mononitrates	2.9–11.0	0.02–0.43
Alkyl dinitrates	2.3–10.5	0.005–1.08
Hydroxy alkyl nitrates	7.3–28	0.005–1.07

=== Formation mechanisms ===
There are two primary mechanisms for producing RONO_{2} in the atmosphere:

1. oxidation of hydrocarbons initiated by hydroxyl radicals (OH) in the presence of NO_{x} during the daytime.
2. oxidation of alkenes initiated by nitrate radicals (NO_{3}) at night.

Methyl nitrate (CH_{3}ONO_{2}), ethyl nitrate (C_{2}H_{5}ONO_{2}), and possibly propyl nitrate (C_{3}H_{7}ONO_{2}) are released directly from the oceans, and concentrations of these compounds reaching up to several tens of ppt have been observed in remote marine environments. Apart from these marine emissions, direct emissions are generally not regarded as a major source. RONO_{2} exhibit a wide range of vapor pressures. It occurs both in gaseous and aerosol particles.

==== OH-initiated RONO_{2} formation ====
When OH reacts with a saturated hydrocarbon (1), it first abstracts a hydrogen atom, and almost immediately afterward, oxygen (O_{2}) adds to the resulting radical to form an RO_{2} radical (2).

RH + OH → R • + H_{2}O (1)
R• + O_{2} → RO_{2} • (2)

Two distinct product pathways (3a and 3b) arise from the reaction between RO_{2} and NO when NO_{x} is present.

RO_{2}• + NO → RO • + NO_{2} (3a)
RO_{2}• + NO → RONO_{2} (3b)

The dominant pathway 3a, produces NO_{2} and an alkoxy radical and thereby continues the NO_{x} and HO_{x} catalytic cycles. In contrast, the less frequent pathway 3b, terminates the chain by generating a stable monofunctional organic nitrate. Reaction 3b is a termolecular process and represents only a minor pathway (typically <5%) compared with the major, bimolecular pathway, reaction 3a.

==== NO_{3}-initiated RONO_{2} formation ====
During daylight hours, the OH-initiated pathway described previously is the primary source of RONO_{2}. At night, in contrast, RONO_{2} formation occurs through reactions of NO_{3} with alkenes and phenols. These nighttime reactions have high nitrate formation amounts. Although the NO_{3} pathway constitutes only a small portion of overall organic oxidation relative to OH, this pathway can still account for up to about 50% of the regional RONO_{2} burden.

The process begins with NO_{3} adding to a carbon–carbon double bond (4). The alkyl radical formed in this step then rapidly reacts with O_{2}, analogous to reaction 2, yielding a peroxy radical (5).

R_{1}=R_{2} + NO_{3} → R_{1}(ONO_{2})- R_{2}• (4)
R_{1}(ONO_{2})−R_{2}• + O_{2} → R_{1}(ONO_{2})−R_{2}O_{2}• (5)

Once formed, this peroxy radical can react with HO_{2}, RO_{2}, or NO_{3}, and these reactions yield stable aldehyde- or alcohol-nitrate products. In contrast, pathways involving NO (3a and 3b) are negligible in the atmosphere because NO_{3} cannot accumulate where NO is present; NO and NO_{3} rapidly react together, producing two NO_{2} molecules. Nitrooxy-peroxynitrates (R_{1}(ONO_{2})–R_{2}O_{2}NO_{2}) can arise from the reaction of nitrooxy-peroxy radicals with NO_{2} and have been detected as transient species in laboratory experiments. However, their strong thermal instability and the lack of ambient detections indicate that they mainly influence how laboratory results are interpreted rather than playing a direct role in atmospheric chemistry. NO_{3} is also theoretically capable of oxidizing alkanes through hydrogen atom abstraction, but this reaction proceeds so slowly that it is not considered important under atmospheric conditions.

=== Atmospheric removal ===
For gas phase, a RONO_{2} molecule has several possible fates: it may be transported by atmospheric winds, take part in further chemical reactions, deposit onto the surface, or partition into the aerosol phase. How quickly any of these processes occur depends on the molecule’s specific structure, which controls both its reactivity and its tendency to deposit or move into particles.

Nitrates that contain multiple functional groups, either formed that way in the first oxidation step or made multifunctional after successive reactions, are expected to be particularly reactive. Molecules that still possess a carbon–carbon double bond or have abstractable hydrogen atoms also tend to be processed more rapidly. As one example, first-generation isoprene nitrates react quickly with both O_{3} and OH, and all eight isomers could survive daytime oxidation but no more than a few hours. With continued oxidation, the rate of resulting higher-generation products would differ from those of the parent nitrate.

The detailed products formed when RONO_{2} is oxidized by OH, O_{3}, and NO_{3} are not well constrained. The overall chemistry can be thought as two main pathways:

1. Oxidation preserves the nitrate group and produces a stable multifunctional nitrate, R_{1}ONO_{2}. Here the original carbon skeleton R has been altered so that the new backbone R_{1} carries additional functional groups (e.g., carbonyls, alcohols, or extra nitrate groups).
2. Oxidation removes the nitrate functionality, releasing NO_{2} and effectively stripping the nitrate group from the molecule.

RONO_{2} compounds absorb near-UV radiation (λ < 340 nm) and break down through photodissociation, yielding RO• radicals and NO2 with quantum efficiencies close to unity. Experimental studies have determined photolysis rates for numerous C_{1}–C_{5} alkyl and cycloalkyl nitrates, as well as for several difunctional organic nitrates.

For smaller members (C_{1}–C_{4}), photolysis rates rival oxidation by OH. Under typical summer surface conditions, photolytic lifetimes can vary from 3 to 10 days. On the other hand, most RONO_{2} species photolysis much slower than reactions with the peroxy radical. Because of this, photolysis is not significant to atmospheric loss.
