= Friction sensitivity =

Sensitivity of friction to surface changes.

Friction sensitivity is a sensitivity of an explosive characterizing the amount of friction or rubbing that a compound can withstand before prematurely exploding. For instance, nitroglycerin has an extremely high sensitivity to friction, meaning that very little rubbing against it could set off a violent explosion. There is no exact determination of the amount of friction required to set off a compound, but is rather approximated by the amount of force applied and the amount of time before the compound explodes. Various methods are in use, characterizing different aspects at different size ranges, and the relationship between size and sensitivity is not the same across all explosives.
