= Brisance =

Shattering ability of a high explosive

Brisance (/brɪˈzɑːns/, /ˈbriːzəns/, /ˈbriːzɒns/; from French briser 'break, shatter') is the shattering capability of a high explosive, determined mainly by its detonation pressure.

== Application ==
Brisance is of practical importance in explosives engineering for determining the effectiveness of an explosion in blasting and quarrying, and in weaponry such as fragmenting shells, bomb casings, grenades, and plastic explosives. The sand crush test and Trauzl lead block test are commonly used to determine the relative brisance in comparison to TNT (which is considered a standard reference for many purposes).

The value of brisance depends on the application. At one extreme, if an explosive is to be used for propulsion, e.g. by driving a piston or a bullet, brisance is likely to be undesirable, because the objective will be to move the load, not to shatter it or the engine or firearm, nor to produce a loud report. Such propulsive charges are designed to burn controllably, such as carburetted fuel/air mixes in vehicle piston engines, or nitrocellulose fibres or grains of controlled textures in firearm cartridges.

For certain types of blasting, as in some civil engineering works, the objective is to loosen the undesired material with the least amount of explosion and expense, both in explosive and safety precautions. Similarly, in quarrying a product such as slate, in which the objective is to loosen it from surrounding rock with as little damage as possible, no more brisance than is necessary to split off the valuable product profitably, without unacceptable waste, is desired. For this purpose blasting powder of low brisance is necessary.

In shattering hard rock or military defences, high brisance generally is necessary, so high explosives with extremely high detonation velocity are used as far as is practical. One of the most brisant of the conventional explosives is cyclotrimethylene trinitramine (also known as RDX or Hexogen). RDX is the explosive agent in the plastic explosive commonly known as C-4, constituting 91% RDX by mass.

Fragmentation occurs by the action of the transmitted shock wave, the strength of which depends on the detonation pressure of the explosive. Generally, the higher this pressure, the finer the fragments generated. High detonation pressure correlates with high detonation velocity, the speed at which the detonation wave propagates through the explosive, but not necessarily with the explosive's total energy (or work capacity), some of which may be released after passage of the detonation wave. A more brisant explosive, therefore, projects smaller fragments but not necessarily at a higher velocity than a less brisant one.

== See also ==
- Relative effectiveness factor
- Table of explosive detonation velocities
