= Detonation velocity =

Characteristic of explosions

Explosive velocity, also known as detonation velocity or velocity of detonation (VoD), is the velocity at which the shock wave front travels through a detonated explosive. Explosive velocities are always higher than the local speed of sound in the material by definition. (Rapid, highly exothermic, sub-sonic reactions are termed deflagrations rather than explosions.)

If the explosive is confined before detonation, such as in an artillery shell, the force produced is focused on a much smaller area, and the pressure is significantly intensified. This results in an explosive velocity that is higher than if the explosive had been detonated in open air. Unconfined velocities are often approximately 70 to 80 percent of confined velocities.

Explosive velocity is increased with smaller particle size (i.e., increased spatial density), increased charge diameter, and increased confinement (i.e., higher pressure).

Typical detonation velocities for organic dust mixtures range from 1,400 to 1,650 m/s. Gas explosions can either deflagrate or detonate based on confinement; detonation velocities are generally around 1,700 m/s but can be as high as 3,000 m/s. Solid explosives often have detonation velocities ranging beyond 4,000 m/s to 10,300 m/s.

Detonation velocity can be measured by the Dautriche method. In essence, this method relies on the time lag between the initiation of two ends of a detonating fuse of a known detonation velocity, inserted radially at two points into the explosive charge at a known distance apart. When the explosive charge is detonated, it triggers one end of the fuse, then the second end. This causes two detonation fronts travelling in opposite direction along the length of the detonating fuse, which meet at a specific point away from the centre of the fuse. Knowing the distance along the detonation charge between the two ends of the fuse, the position of the collision of the detonation fronts, and the detonation velocity of the detonating fuse, the detonation velocity of the explosive is calculated and is expressed in km/s.

In other words "VOD is the velocity or rate of propagation of chemical decomposition/reaction." And for high explosives, it is generally above 1,000 m/s.

In the cases where a material has not received dedicated testing, rough predictions based upon gas behavior theory are sometimes used (see Chapman–Jouguet condition).

The detonation velocity can be effectively determined by the Chapman–Jouguet (CJ) state, which represents the minimum sustainable steady detonation speed.

== See also ==
- Table of explosive detonation velocities
- Brisance
- Burn rate
- Detonation
- Explosion
- Deflagration
- Flame speed
- Gurney equations
