= NTB (explosive) =

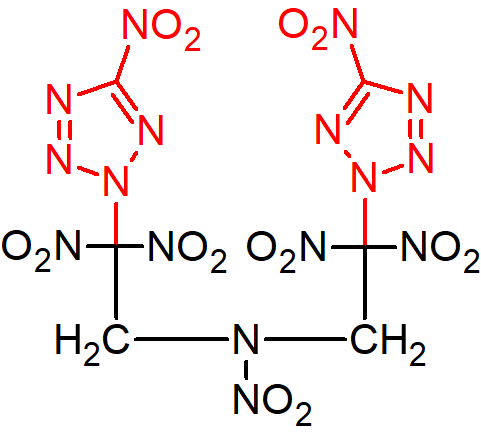

Names
- Preferred IUPAC name Bis[2,2-dinitro-2-(5-nitrotetrazol-2-yl)ethyl]nitramide
- Other names NTB

Identifiers
3D model (JSmol)	Interactive image
- InChI: InChI=1S/C6H4N16O14/c23-14(24)3-7-11-16(9-3)5(18(27)28,19(29)30)1-13(22(35)36)2-6(20(31)32,21(33)34)17-10-4(8-12-17)15(25)26/h1-2H2 Key: DICAGBNKWKITAH-UHFFFAOYSA-N
- SMILES: O=N(=O)c2nnn(C(CN(CC(N(=O)=O)(N(=O)=O)n1nnc(N(=O)=O)n1)N(=O)=O)(N(=O)=O)N(=O)=O)n2

Properties
Chemical formula	C_{6}H_{4}N_{16}O_{14}
Molar mass	524.196 g·mol^{−1}
Appearance	Off-white solid
Density	2.06 g/cm^{3}
Melting point	65 °C (149 °F; 338 K) (decomposes)
Solubility	Soluble in acetone, acetonitrile

Hazards
- Occupational safety and health (OHS/OSH)
Main hazards	Explosive compound

Explosive data
Shock sensitivity	0.7 J
Friction sensitivity	6 N
Detonation velocity	10,100 m/s

Related compounds
Related compounds	tetrazole bis(2,2,2-trinitroethyl)nitramide
- Except where otherwise noted, data are given for materials in their standard state (at 25 °C [77 °F], 100 kPa). Infobox references

Bis[2,2-dinitro-2-(5-nitrotetrazol-2-yl)ethyl]nitramide, commonly abbreviated as NTB, is a proposed green energetic compound designed for potential use in advanced applications. Introduced in a 2010 scientific paper, NTB is notable for its theoretical ability to achieve a detonation velocity exceeding 10,000 m/s. However, its high sensitivity and poor thermal stability pose significant challenges for practical implementation.

== Background and design ==
The development of NTB stems from the search for "green" energetic materials—compounds with zero oxygen balance that outperform traditional explosives while potentially offering environmental benefits, such as reduced toxicity or absence of halogens. Researchers focused on molecules with densities exceeding 2.0 g/cm^{3} to achieve extreme performance metrics, including detonation velocities above 10,000 m/s and detonation pressures over 50 GPa. NTB was designed by combining nitroheterocyclic (specifically 5-nitrotetrazole), dinitromethyl, and nitramide functional groups. It is structurally analogous to bis(2,2,2-trinitroethyl)nitramide, which has a density of 1.97 g/cm^{3} in one of its crystal forms. The incorporation of the 5-nitrotetrazole fragment allows NTB to theoretically surpass the density and performance barriers that limit other candidates like [[1,2,3,4]tetrazino[5,6-e][1,2,3,4]tetrazine-1,3,6,8-tetraoxide]] (TTTO), octanitrocubane (ONC), and 4,4'-Dinitro-3,3'-diazenofuroxan (DDF).

== Properties ==
Theoretical calculations indicate that NTB could achieve a detonation velocity of approximately 10,100 m/s at its maximum density, along with a detonation pressure approaching 50 GPa. These values position NTB as superior to leading industrial energetic materials. Despite these advantages, NTB exhibits high mechanical sensitivity and limited thermal stability, which restrict its real-world applicability. The compound's zero oxygen balance contributes to its classification as a CHNO "green" explosive, potentially minimizing environmental impact compared to conventional alternatives.

== Challenges ==
The primary obstacles for NTB are its high sensitivity, which increases handling risks, and poor thermal stability, which could lead to premature decomposition. These issues highlight the trade-offs in designing ultra-high-performance energetic compounds.

== See also ==
- Hexanitrobenzene (HNB)
- Hexanitrohexaazaisowurtzitane (HNIW)
- HHTDD (Hexanitrohexaazatricyclododecanedione)
