= Adam J. Matzger =

Chemistry researcher

- Born: Piedmont, California
- Education: Oberlin College, University of California, Berkeley, California Institute of Technology
- Scientific career
- Fields: Chemistry
- Workplaces: University of Michigan
- Doctoral advisor: Peter C. Vollhardt
- Other academic advisors: Robert H. Grubbs and Nathan S. Lewis
- Website: http://umich.edu/~ajmgroup/

Adam J. Matzger, a researcher in polymers and crystals, is the Charles G. Overberger Collegiate Professor of Chemistry at the University of Michigan.

== Biography ==
Matzger is a native of Piedmont, California but moved to Ohio to complete his undergraduate career at Oberlin College, where he graduated with a Bachelor of Arts in Chemistry in 1992. From there he moved back to California for his graduate work at the University of California at Berkeley where he studied under Professor Peter C. Vollhardt. In 1997 he earned his Ph. D. degree with a thesis titled "Synthetic, Theoretical, and Structural Studies on Dehydrobenzoannulenes and Phenylenes."

He then was a Postdoctoral Researcher at California Institute of Technology (co-mentored by Robert H. Grubbs and Nathan S. Lewis) until 2000 when he was appointed Assistant Professor of Chemistry and of Macromolecular Science and Engineering at the University of Michigan. In 2006 he became an Associate Professor and finally a full Professor in 2009; in 2013 he was appointed as the Charles G. Overberger Collegiate Professor of Chemistry. His group researches a range of topics in organic materials, specifically porous materials, polymorphism and metal organic frameworks (MOFs). He is also leading a Multi-University Research Initiative (MURI), funded by the US Army, for improving material properties through cocrystallization.

== Scientific career ==
While traditionally polymorphs are discovered or selectively made through manipulation of growth conditions, such as temperature or solvent, Matzger's group has instead found the ability to control polymorphs by employing different polymers to induce heteronucleation. He first showed this ability with the control over the monoclinic and orthorhombic forms of acetaminophen, a widely used pharmaceutical. This is the only polymorph discovery technique invented in the last 100 years to substantially increase the range of polymorphs accessible;

Matzger has pioneered the use of cocrystallization for development of energetic materials. His group has made numerous cocrystals with increased power and decreased sensitivity. Among these are a 2:1 cocrystal of CL-20:HMX and a 1:1 CL20:TNT(2,4,6-trinitro-toluene). CL-20 (2,4,6,8,10,12-hexanitro-2,4,6,8,10,12-hexaazaiso-wurtzitane) is a powerful explosive that is too sensitive to be viable in military use and HMX (1,3,5,7-tetranitro-1,3,5,7-tetrazacyclooctane) is a standard military explosive. Previous to his work, only aromatic energetic materials were able to form cocrystals because of their ability to pi-stack. Cocrystals that his group have formed are realized through CH hydrogen bonding with the oxygen atoms from the nitro groups, thus opening cocrystallization to the more powerful non-aromatic energetics.

His group uses scanning tunneling microscopy to investigate the spontaneous self-assembly of physisorbed monolayers at atmospheric conditions, two-dimensional crystallization. From this they have created a two-dimensional structural database (2DSD) which has helped unify the view of interfacial self-assembly making it possible to draw comparisons to bulk crystals. This allows the investigation of the differences that arise due to the presence of an interface or reduced dimensionality.

His lab synthesized metal-organic frameworks (MOFs) with high surface areas. Through a collaboration with Michael O'Keeffe and Omar M. Yaghi, they developed MOF-177, or Zn_{4}O(1,3,5-benzenetribenzonate)_{2}, which has a very large surface area, 4,500 m^{2}g^{−1} and extra large pores which allow the binding of large guest molecules, such as polycyclic organic molecules, the combination of which was not possible in a single material prior to this. Developments from this have included the introduction of coordination copolymerization for producing high surface area materials from simple feedstocks.

== Awards and honors ==
- Associate editor, Crystal Growth & Design, American Chemical Society 2011–2018
- American Association for the Advancement of Science Fellow 2010
- Member Editorial Advisory Board of Journal of Pharmaceutical Sciences 2008-2010
- Alfred P. Sloan Foundation Research Fellow 2005-2007
- Beckman Young Investigators Award, The Arnold and Mabel Beckman Foundation, 2003
