= HHTDD =

Names
- Preferred IUPAC name 1,3,4,5,7,8-Hexanitrooctahydrodiimidazo[4,5-b:4′,5′-e]pyrazine-2,6(1H,3H)-dione
- Other names Hexanitrohexaazatricyclododecanedione

Identifiers
CAS Number	115029-33-9
3D model (JSmol)	Interactive image
ChemSpider	23078717
PubChem CID	14870237
UNII	A4D9GR5FE5
CompTox Dashboard (EPA)	DTXSID401029627
- InChI: InChI=1S/C6H4N12O14/c19-5-9(15(25)26)1-2(10(5)16(27)28)8(14(23)24)4-3(7(1)13(21)22)11(17(29)30)6(20)12(4)18(31)32/h1-4H Key: ZFBXJPJQJKATGM-UHFFFAOYSA-N; InChI=1/C6H4N12O14/c19-5-9(15(25)26)1-2(10(5)16(27)28)8(14(23)24)4-3(7(1)13(21)22)11(17(29)30)6(20)12(4)18(31)32/h1-4H Key: ZFBXJPJQJKATGM-UHFFFAOYAE
- SMILES: C12C(N(C3C(N1[N+](=O)[O-])N(C(=O)N3[N+](=O)[O-])[N+](=O)[O-])[N+](=O)[O-])N(C(=O)N2[N+](=O)[O-])[N+](=O)[O-]

Properties
Chemical formula	C_{6}H_{4}N_{12}O_{14}
Molar mass	468.168 g·mol^{−1}

Explosive data
Detonation velocity	9700 m/s
- Except where otherwise noted, data are given for materials in their standard state (at 25 °C [77 °F], 100 kPa). verify (what is ?) Infobox references

HHTDD (hexanitrohexaazatricyclododecanedione) is a powerful but moisture sensitive explosive compound. It is essentially an open analogue of the cyclic nitroamine cage compounds such as CL-20. While it is highly explosive, with a velocity of detonation even higher than that of CL-20, HHTDD readily decomposes in the presence of even trace amounts of water, making it unsuitable for any practical applications.

== See also ==
- 2,4,6-Tris(trinitromethyl)-1,3,5-triazine
- 4,4'-Dinitro-3,3'-diazenofuroxan (DDF)
- Heptanitrocubane
- Octanitrocubane
- RE factor
