= NHN =

NHN may refer to:

- NHN Corporation, the previous name of South Korean firm which later split into Naver Corporation and NHN Corporation
- Nickel hydrazine nitrate, an explosive
- Normalhöhennull, the standard geographical height system used in Germany
- New Hampshire Northcoast Corporation, a US railroad company
