= TNT equivalent =

Class of units of measurement for explosive energy

- 11-megaton nuclear test at Bikini Atoll in 1954

General information
- Unit system: Non-standard
- Unit of: Energy
- Symbol: t, ton of TNT

Conversions
1 t in ...	... is equal to ...
- SI base units: ≈ 4.184 gigajoules
- CGS: 10^{9} calories

TNT equivalent is a convention for expressing energy, typically used to describe the energy released in an explosion. A ton of TNT equivalent is a unit of energy defined by convention to be 4.184 gigajoules (1 gigacalorie). It is the approximate energy released in the detonation of a metric ton (megagram) of trinitrotoluene (TNT). In other words, for each gram of TNT exploded, 4.184 kilojoules (or 1 kcal) of energy are released. This convention intends to compare the destructiveness of an event with that of conventional explosive materials, of which TNT is a typical example, although other conventional explosives such as dynamite contain more energy. A related concept is the physical quantity TNT-equivalent mass (or mass of TNT equivalent), expressed in the ordinary units of mass and its multiples: kilogram (kg), megagram (Mg) or tonne (t), etc.

The unit is routinely used to describe the yield of nuclear weapons. The 1945 atomic bombings of Hiroshima and Nagasaki used the Little Boy and Fat Man bombs, with yields of approximately 15 and 20 kilotons respectively. During the nuclear arms race, thermonuclear weapons were developed with yields in the megaton range. The largest nuclear weapon ever tested was the Tsar Bomba at 50 megatons. Only a handful of nuclear tests exceeded 10 megatons. Modern strategic nuclear weapons have yields of at least 100 kilotons.

== Kiloton and megaton ==
The "kiloton (of TNT equivalent)" is a unit of energy equal to 4.184 terajoules (4.184×10^{12} J). A kiloton of TNT can be visualized as a cube of TNT 8.46 metres (27.8 ft) on a side.

The "megaton (of TNT equivalent)" is a unit of energy equal to 4.184 petajoules (4.184×10^{15} J).

The kiloton and megaton of TNT equivalent have traditionally been used to describe the energy output, and hence the destructive power, of a nuclear weapon. The TNT equivalent appears in various nuclear weapon control treaties, and has been used to characterize the energy released in asteroid impacts.

== Historical derivation of the value ==
Alternative values for TNT equivalency can be calculated according to which property is being compared and when in the two detonation processes the values are measured.

Where for example the comparison is by energy yield, an explosive's energy is normally expressed for chemical purposes as the thermodynamic work produced by its detonation. For TNT this has been accurately measured as 4,686 J/g from a large sample of air blast experiments, and theoretically calculated to be 4,853 J/g.

However, even on this basis, comparing the actual energy yields of a large nuclear device and an explosion of TNT can be slightly inaccurate. Small TNT explosions, especially in the open, do not tend to burn the carbon-particle and hydrocarbon products of the explosion. Gas-expansion and pressure-change effects tend to "freeze" the burn rapidly. A large, open explosion of TNT may maintain fireball temperatures high enough that some of those products do burn up with atmospheric oxygen.

Such differences can be substantial. For safety purposes, a range as wide as 2,673–6,702 J has been stated for a gram of TNT upon explosion. Thus one can state that a nuclear bomb has a yield of 15 kt (6.3×10^{13} J), but the explosion of an actual 15,000-ton pile of TNT may yield (for example) 8×10^{13} J due to additional carbon/hydrocarbon oxidation not present with small open-air charges.

These complications have been sidestepped by convention. The energy released by one gram of TNT was arbitrarily defined as a matter of convention to be 4,184 J, which is exactly one kilocalorie.

Grams TNT	Symbol	Tons TNT	Symbol	Energy	Corresponding mass loss (Note: Mass–energy equivalence.)
milligram of TNT	mg	nanoton of TNT	nt	4.184 J (1.162 mWh)	46.55 fg
gram of TNT	g	microton of TNT	μt	4.184 kJ (4,184 J; 1.162 Wh)	46.55 pg
kilogram of TNT	kg	milliton of TNT	mt	4.184 MJ (4,184,000 J; 1.162 kWh)	46.55 ng
megagram of TNT	Mg	ton of TNT	t	4.184 GJ (4.184×10^{9} J; 1.162 MWh)	46.55 μg
gigagram of TNT	Gg	kiloton of TNT	kt	4.184 TJ (4.184×10^{12} J; 1.162 GWh)	46.55 mg
teragram of TNT	Tg	megaton of TNT	Mt	4.184 PJ (4.184×10^{15} J; 1.162 TWh)	46.55 g
petagram of TNT	Pg	gigaton of TNT	Gt	4.184 EJ (4.184×10^{18} J);1.162 PWh	46.55 kg

== Conversion to other units ==
1 ton of TNT equivalent is approximately:

- 1.0×10^{9} calories
- 4.184×10^{9} joules
- 3.96831×10^{6} British thermal units
- 3.086×10^{9} foot-pounds
- 1.162×10^{3} kilowatt-hours
- 2.611×10^{28} electronvolts
- 4.655×10^{−8} kilograms mass equivalent
- 2.139 Planck energies

== Examples ==
Energy		Description
Megatons of TNT	Watt-hours [Wh]	Description
1×10^{−12}	1.162 Wh	≈ 1 food kilocalorie (kilocalorie, kcal), which is the approximate amount of energy needed to raise the temperature of one kilogram of water by one degree Celsius at a pressure of one atmosphere.
1×10^{−9}	1.162 kWh	Under controlled conditions one kilogram of TNT can destroy (or even obliterate) a small vehicle.
4.8×10^{−9}	5.6 kWh	The energy to burn 1 kilogram of wood.
1×10^{−8}	11.62 kWh	The approximate radiant heat energy released during 3-phase, 600 V, 100 kA arcing fault in a 0.5 m × 0.5 m × 0.5 m (20 in × 20 in × 20 in) compartment within a 1-second period.
1.2×10^{−8}	13.94 kWh	Amount of TNT used (12 kg) in Coptic church explosion in Cairo, Egypt on 11 December 2016 that left 29 dead and 47 injured.
1.9×10^{−6}	2.90 MWh	The television show MythBusters used 2.5 tons of ANFO to make "homemade" diamonds. (Episode 116)
2.4×10^{−7}–2.4×10^{−6}	280–2,800 kWh	The energy output released by an average lightning discharge.
(1–44)×10^{−6}	1.16–51.14 MWh	Conventional bombs yield from less than one ton to FOAB's 44 tons. The yield of a Tomahawk cruise missile is equivalent to 500 kg of TNT.
4.54×10^{−4}	581 MWh	A real 0.454-kiloton-of-TNT (1.90 TJ) charge at Operation Sailor Hat. If the charge were a full sphere, it would be 1 kiloton of TNT (4.2 TJ). 454 tons of TNT (5 by 10 m (17 by 34 ft)) awaiting detonation at Operation Sailor Hat.
1.8×10^{−3}	2.088 GWh	Estimated yield of the Beirut explosion of 2,750 tons of ammonium nitrate that killed initially 137 at and near a Lebanese port at 6 p.m. local time Tuesday 4 August 2020. An independent study by experts from the Blast and Impact Research Group at the University of Sheffield predicts the best estimate of the yield of Beirut explosion to be 0.5 kilotons of TNT and the reasonable bound estimate as 1.12 kilotons of TNT.
(1–2)×10^{−3}	1.16–2.32 GWh	Estimated yield of the Oppau explosion that killed more than 500 at a German fertilizer factory in 1921.
2.3×10^{−3}	2.67 GWh	Amount of solar energy falling on 4,000 m^{2} (1 acre) of land in a year is 9.5 TJ (2,650 MWh) (an average over the Earth's surface).
2.9×10^{−3}	3.4 GWh	The Halifax Explosion in 1917 was the accidental detonation of 200 tons of TNT and 2,300 tons of Picric acid.
3.2×10^{−3}	3.6 GWh	The Operation Big Bang on 18 April 1947, blasted the bunkers on Heligoland. It accumulated 6700 metric tons of surplus World War II ammunition placed in various locations around the island and set off. The energy released was 1.3×10^{13} J, or about 3.2 kilotons of TNT equivalent.
4×10^{−3}	9.3 GWh	Minor Scale, a 1985 United States conventional explosion, using 4,744 tons of ANFO explosive to provide a scaled equivalent airblast of an eight kiloton (33.44 TJ) nuclear device, is believed to be the largest planned detonation of conventional explosives in history.
(1.5–2)×10^{−2}	17.4–23.2 GWh	The Little Boy atomic bomb dropped on Hiroshima on 6 August 1945, exploded with an energy of about 15 kilotons of TNT (63 TJ) killing between 90,000 and 166,000 people, and the Fat Man atomic bomb dropped on Nagasaki on 9 August 1945, exploded with an energy of about 20 kilotons of TNT (84 TJ) killing over 60,000. The modern nuclear weapons in the United States arsenal range in yield from 0.3 kt (1.3 TJ) to 1.2 Mt (5.0 PJ) equivalent, for the B83 strategic bomb.
2.4×10^{−1}	280 GWh	The typical energy yield of severe thunderstorms.
1.5×10^{−5} – 6×10^{−1}	20 MWh – 700 GWh	The estimated kinetic energy of tornados.
1	1.16 TWh	The energy contained in one megaton of TNT (4.2 PJ) is enough to power the average American household for 103,000 years. The 30 Mt (130 PJ) estimated upper limit blast power of the Tunguska event could power the same average home for more than 3,100,000 years. The energy of that blast could power the entire United States for 3.27 days.
8.6	10 TWh	The energy output that would be released by a typical tropical cyclone in one minute, primarily from water condensation. Winds constitute 0.25% of that energy.
16	18.6 TWh	The approximate radiated surface energy released in a magnitude 8 earthquake.
21.5	25 TWh	The complete conversion of 1 kg of matter into pure energy would yield the theoretical maximum (E = mc^{2}) of 89.8 petajoules, which is equivalent to 21.5 megatons of TNT. No such method of total conversion as combining 500 grams of matter with 500 grams of antimatter has yet been achieved. In the event of proton–antiproton annihilation, approximately 50% of the released energy will escape in the form of neutrinos, which are almost undetectable. Electron–positron annihilation events emit their energy entirely as gamma rays.
24	28 TWh	Approximate total yield of the 1980 eruption of Mount St. Helens.
26.3	30.6 TWh	Energy released by the 2004 Indian Ocean earthquake. An animation of the 2004 Indian Ocean tsunami.
45	53 TWh	The energy released in the 2011 Tōhoku earthquake and tsunami was over 200,000 times the surface energy and was calculated by the USGS at 1.9×10^{17}joules, slightly less than the 2004 Indian Ocean quake. It was estimated at a moment magnitude of 9.0–9.1. The damage caused by the 2011 Tōhoku tsunami.
50–56	58 TWh	The Soviet Union developed a prototype thermonuclear device, nicknamed the Tsar Bomba, which was tested at 50–56 Mt (210–230 PJ), but had a maximum theoretical design yield of 100 Mt (420 PJ). The effective destructive potential of such a weapon varies greatly, depending on such conditions as the altitude at which it is detonated, the characteristics of the target, the terrain, and the physical landscape upon which it is detonated.
61	70.9 TWh	The energy released by the 2022 Hunga Tonga–Hunga Haʻapai volcanic eruption, in the southern Pacific Ocean, is estimated to have been equivalent to 61 Megatons of TNT.
84	97.04 TWh	The solar irradiance on Earth every second. (Note: The solar constant of the sun is 1370 watts per square meter and Earth has a cross-sectional surface area of 2.6×10^{14} square meters.)
200	230 TWh	The total energy released by the 1883 eruption of Krakatoa in the Dutch East Indies (present-day Indonesia).
540	630 TWh	The total energy released worldwide by all nuclear explosions combined, from 1945 to the present, is about 540 megatons.
1460	1.69 PWh	The total global nuclear arsenal is about 15,000 nuclear warheads with a destructive capacity of around 1460 megatons or 1.46 gigatons (1,460 million tons) of TNT. This is the equivalent of 6.11×10^{18} joules of energy.
2680	3 PWh	The energy yield of the 1960 Valdivia earthquake, was estimated at a moment magnitude of 9.4–9.6. This is the most powerful earthquake recorded in history. The aftermath of the 1960 Valdivia earthquake.
2870	3.34 PWh	The energy released by a hurricane per day during condensation.
33000	38.53 PWh	The total energy released by the 1815 eruption of Mount Tambora in the island of Sumbawa in Indonesia. Yielded the equivalent of 2.2 million Little Boys (the first atomic bomb to drop on Japan) or one-quarter of the entire world's annual energy consumption. This eruption was 4-10 times more destructive than the 1883 Krakatoa eruption.
240000	280 PWh	The approximate total yield of the super-eruption of the La Garita Caldera is 10,000 times more powerful than the 1980 Mount St. Helens eruption. It was the second most energetic event to have occurred on Earth since the Cretaceous–Paleogene extinction event 66 million years ago. A photo of the La Garita Caldera.
301000	350 PWh	The total solar irradiance energy received by Earth in the upper atmosphere per hour. (Note: The solar constant of the sun is 1370 watts per square meter and Earth has a cross-sectional surface area of 2.6×10^{14} square meters.) (Note: 1 hour is equivalent to 3600 seconds.)
875000	1.02 EWh	Approximate yield of the last eruption of the Yellowstone supervolcano. Image of the Yellowstone supervolcano.
3.61×10^{6}	4.2 EWh	The solar irradiance of the Sun every 12 hours. (Note: 1 day is equivalent to 86400 seconds.)
6×10^{6}	7 EWh	The estimated energy at impact when the largest fragment of Comet Shoemaker–Levy 9 struck Jupiter is equivalent to 6 million megatons (6 trillion tons) of TNT. The impact site of the Comet Shoemaker-Levy 9.
7.2×10^{7}	116 EWh	Estimates in 2010 show that the kinetic energy of the Chicxulub impact event yielded 72 teratons of TNT equivalent (1 teraton of TNT equals 10^{6} megatons of TNT) which caused the K-Pg extinction event, wiping out 75% of all species on Earth. This is far more destructive than any natural disaster recorded in history. Such an event would have caused global volcanism, earthquakes, megatsunamis, and global climate change. The animation of the Chicxulub impact.
2.4×10^{10}	>28 ZWh	The impact energy of Archean asteroids.
9.1×10^{10}	106 ZWh	The total energy output of the Sun per second.
2.4×10^{11}	280 ZWh	The kinetic energy of the Caloris Planitia impactor. The photo of the Caloris Planitia on Mercury. Taken by the MESSENGER orbiter.
5.972×10^{15}	6.94 RWh	The explosive energy of a quantity of TNT of the mass of Earth.
7.89×10^{15}	9.17 RWh	Total solar output in all directions per day.
1.98×10^{21}	2.3×10^{33} Wh	The explosive energy of a quantity of TNT of the mass of the Sun.
(2.4–4.8)×10^{28}	(2.8–5.6)×10^{40} Wh	A type Ia supernova explosion gives off 1–2×10^{44} joules of energy, which is about 2.4–4.8 hundred billion yottatons (24–48 octillion (2.4–4.8×10^{28}) megatons) of TNT, equivalent to the explosive force of a quantity of TNT over a trillion (10^{12}) times the mass of the planet Earth. This is the astrophysical standard candle used to determine galactic distances.
(2.4–4.8)×10^{30}	(2.8–5.6)×10^{42} Wh	The largest type of supernova observed, gamma-ray bursts (GRBs) release more than 10^{46} joules of energy.
1.3×10^{32}	1.5×10^{44} Wh	A merger of two black holes, resulting in the first observation of gravitational waves, released 5.3×10^{47} joules.
9.6×10^{53}	1.12×10^{66} Wh	Estimated mass-energy of the observable universe.

== Relative effectiveness factor ==
The relative effectiveness factor (RE factor) relates an explosive's demolition power to that of TNT, in units of the TNT equivalent/kg (TNTe/kg). The RE factor is the relative mass of TNT to which an explosive is equivalent; the greater the RE, the more powerful the explosive.

This enables engineers to determine the proper masses of different explosives when applying blasting formulas developed specifically for TNT. For example, if a timber-cutting formula calls for a charge of 1 kg of TNT, then based on octanitrocubane's RE factor of 2.38, it would take only 1.0/2.38 (or 0.42) kg of it to do the same job. Using PETN, engineers would need 1.0/1.66 (or 0.60) kg to obtain the same effects as 1 kg of TNT. With ANFO or ammonium nitrate, they would require 1.0/0.74 (or 1.35) kg or 1.0/0.32 (or 3.125) kg, respectively.

Calculating a single RE factor for an explosive is, however, impossible. It depends on the specific case or use. Given a pair of explosives where one can produce double the shockwave output (this depends on the distance of measuring instruments), the difference in direct metal cutting ability may be quadruple for one type of metal and septuple for another type of metal. The relative differences between two explosives with shaped charges will be even greater. The table below should be taken as an example and not as a precise source of data.

Some relative effectiveness factor examples
Explosive, grade	Density (g/ml)	Detonation vel. (m/s)	Relative effectiveness
Ammonium nitrate (AN + <0.5% H_{2}O)	0.88	2,700	0.32
Mercury(II) fulminate	4.42	4,250	0.51
Black powder (75% KNO_{3} + 19% C + 6% S, ancient low explosive)	1.65	400	0.55
Hexamine dinitrate (HDN)	1.30	5,070	0.60
Dinitrobenzene (DNB)	1.50	6,025	0.60
HMTD (hexamine peroxide)	0.88	4,520	0.74
ANFO (94% AN + 6% fuel oil)	0.92	4,200	0.74
Urea nitrate	1.67	4,700	0.77
TATP (acetone peroxide)	1.18	5,300	0.80
Tovex Extra (AN water gel) commercial product	1.33	5,690	0.80
Hydromite 600 (AN water emulsion) commercial product	1.24	5,550	0.80
ANNMAL (66% AN + 25% NM + 5% Al + 3% C + 1% TETA)	1.16	5,360	0.87
Amatol (50% TNT + 50% AN)	1.50	6,290	0.91
Nitroguanidine	1.76	6,750	1.04, ballistic mortar test; 1.01, Trauzl test; 0.95, Plate dent test
Trinitrotoluene (TNT)	1.60	6,900	1.00
Hexanitrostilbene (HNS)	1.70	7,080	1.05
Nitrourea	1.45	6,860	1.05
Tritonal (80% TNT + 20% aluminium) (Note: TBX (thermobaric explosives) or EBX (enhanced blast explosives), in a small, confined space, may have over twice the power of destruction. The total power of aluminized mixtures strictly depends on the condition of explosions.)	1.70	6,650	1.05
Nickel hydrazine nitrate (NHN)	1.70	7,000	1.05
Amatol (80% TNT + 20% AN)	1.55	6,570	1.10
Nitrocellulose (13.5% N, NC; AKA guncotton)	1.40	6,400	1.10
Nitromethane (NM)	1.13	6,360	1.10
PBXW-126 (22% NTO, 20% RDX, 20% AP, 26% Al, 12% PU's system)	1.80	6,450	1.10
Diethylene glycol dinitrate (DEGDN)	1.38	6,610	1.17
PBXIH-135 EB (42% HMX, 33% Al, 25% PCP-TMETN's system)	1.81	7,060	1.17
PBXN-109 (64% RDX, 20% Al, 16% HTPB's system)	1.68	7,450	1.17
Triaminotrinitrobenzene (TATB)	1.80	7,550	1.17
Picric acid (TNP)	1.71	7,350	1.17
Trinitrobenzene (TNB)	1.60	7,300	1.20
Tetrytol (70% tetryl + 30% TNT)	1.60	7,370	1.20
Dynamite, Nobel's (75% NG + 23% diatomite)	1.48	7,200	1.25
Tetryl	1.71	7,770	1.25
Torpex (aka HBX, 41% RDX + 40% TNT + 18% Al + 1% wax)	1.80	7,440	1.30
Composition B (63% RDX + 36% TNT + 1% wax)	1.72	7,840	1.33
Composition C-3 (78% RDX)	1.60	7,630	1.33
Composition C-4 (91% RDX)	1.59	8,040	1.34
Pentolite (56% PETN + 44% TNT)	1.66	7,520	1.33
Semtex 1A (76% PETN + 6% RDX)	1.55	7,670	1.35
Hexal (76% RDX + 20% Al + 4% wax)	1.79	7,640	1.35
RISAL P (50% IPN + 28% RDX + 15% Al + 4% Mg + 1% Zr + 2% NC)	1.39	5,980	1.40
Hydrazine nitrate	1.59	8,500	1.42
Mixture: 24% nitrobenzene + 76% TNM	1.48	8,060	1.50
Mixture: 30% nitrobenzene + 70% nitrogen tetroxide	1.39	8,290	1.50
Nitroglycerin (NG)	1.59	7,700	1.54
Methyl nitrate (MN)	1.21	6300	1.54
Octol (80% HMX + 19% TNT + 1% DNT)	1.83	8,690	1.54
Nitrotriazolone (NTO)	1.87	8,120	1.60
DADNE (1,1-diamino-2,2-dinitroethene, FOX-7)	1.77	8,330	1.60
Gelignite (92% NG + 7% nitrocellulose)	1.60	7,970	1.60
Plastics Gel (in toothpaste tube: 45% PETN + 45% NG + 5% DEGDN + 4% NC)	1.51	7,940	1.60
Composition A-5 (98% RDX + 2% stearic acid)	1.65	8,470	1.60
Erythritol tetranitrate (ETN)	1.72	8,206	1.60
Hexogen (RDX)	1.78	8,600	1.60
PBXW-11 (96% HMX, 1% HyTemp, 3% DOA)	1.81	8,720	1.60
Penthrite (PETN)	1.77	8,400	1.66
Ethylene glycol dinitrate (EGDN)	1.49	7300	1.66
MEDINA (Methylene dinitroamine)	1.65	8,700	1.70
Trinitroazetidine (TNAZ)	1.86	9,597	1.70
Octogen (HMX grade B)	1.95	9,100	1.70
Hexanitrobenzene (HNB)	1.97	9,340	1.80
Hexanitrohexaazaisowurtzitane (HNIW; AKA CL-20)	1.97	9,500	1.90
AFX-757 (25% RDX, 30% ammonium perchlorate, 33% aluminium)	1.84	6,080	1.90
TKX-50	1.92	9,698	~1.90
DDF (4,4'-Dinitro-3,3'-diazenofuroxan)	1.98	10,000	1.95
Heptanitrocubane (HNC) (Note: Predicted values)	1.92	9,200	N/A
Octanitrocubane (ONC)	1.95	10,600	2.38
Octaazacubane (OAC)	2.69	15,000	>5.00

=== Nuclear examples ===
Nuclear weapons and the most powerful non-nuclear weapon examples
Weapon	Total yield (kilotons of TNT)	Mass (kg)	Relative effectiveness
GBU-57 bomb (Massive Ordnance Penetrator, MOP)	0.0035	13,600	0.26
Grand Slam (Earthquake bomb, M110)	0.0065	9,900	0.66
Bomb used in Oklahoma City (ANFO based on racing fuel)	0.0018	2,300	0.78
BLU-82 (Daisy Cutter)	0.0075	6,800	1.10
MOAB (non-nuclear bomb, GBU-43)	0.011	9,800	1.13
FOAB (advanced thermobaric bomb, ATBIP)	0.044	7,100	6.20
W54, Mk-54 (Davy Crockett)	0.022	23	1,000
Little Boy (dropped on Hiroshima) A-bomb	15	4,400	4,000
Fat Man (dropped on Nagasaki) A-bomb	20	4,600	4,500
W54, B54 (SADM)	1.0	23	43,500
Classic (one-stage) fission A-bomb	22	420	50,000
Hypothetical suitcase nuke	2.5	31	80,000
Typical (two-stage) thermonuclear weapon	500–1,000	650–1,120	900,000
W88 modern thermonuclear warhead (MIRV)	470	355	1,300,000
Tsar nuclear bomb (three-stage)	50,000–56,000	26,500	2,100,000
B53 nuclear bomb (two-stage)	9,000	4,050	2,200,000
Operation Dominic Housatonic (two-stage)	9,960	3,239	3,042,400
W56 thermonuclear warhead	1,200	272–308	4,960,000
B41 nuclear bomb (three-stage)	25,000	4,850	5,100,000

== See also ==
- Brisance
- Net explosive quantity
- Nuclear weapon yield
- Orders of magnitude (energy)
- Table of explosive detonation velocities
- Tonne of oil equivalent, a unit of energy almost exactly 10 tonnes of TNT
