= NTB =

NTB may refer to:

== Organizations ==
- National Tire and Battery, an American brand of auto service centers
- Nations Trust Bank, a bank in Sri Lanka
- Norsk Telegrambyrå, a Norwegian press agency
- Nepal Tourism Board, Government agency of Nepal

== Other uses ==
- Non-tariff barriers to trade
- Notodden Airport, Tuven, Norway, by IATA code
- Nusa Tenggara Barat, (West Nusa Tenggara) a province of Indonesia
- Net-top box, a type of set-top box
- NTB (band), a South Korean boyband
- NTB (explosive), a proposed explosive chemical
