= Iceane =

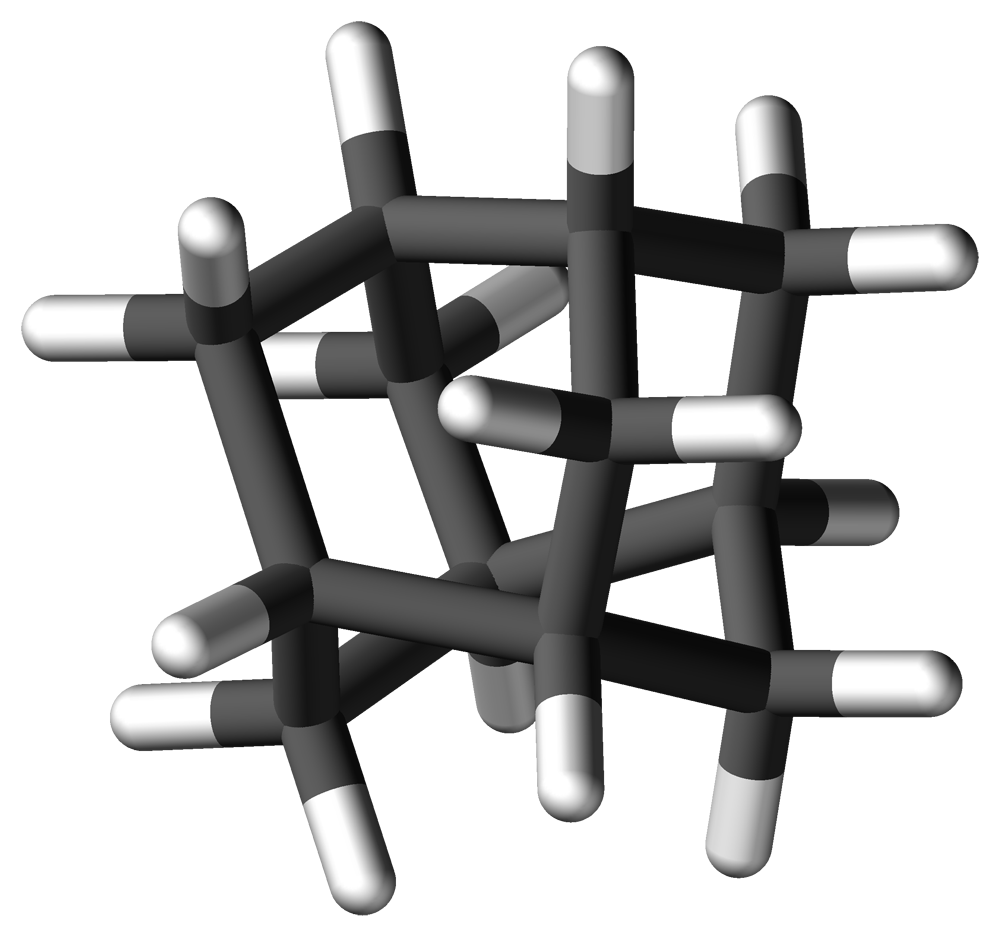

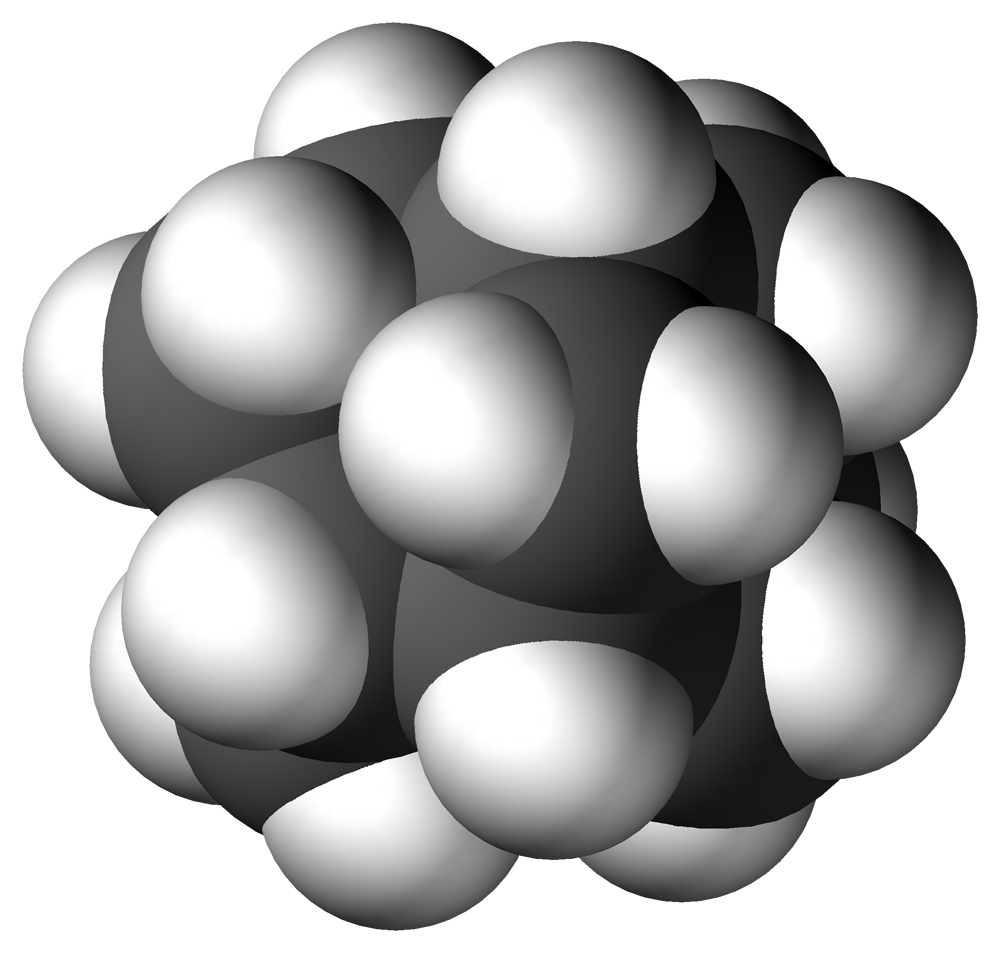

Names
- IUPAC name Tetracyclo[5.3.1.1^{2,6}.0^{4,9}]dodecane
- Other names Wurtzitane

Identifiers
CAS Number	53283-19-5
3D model (JSmol)	Interactive image
ChemSpider	26333278
PubChem CID	595503
UNII	QV8UUF9ZUY
CompTox Dashboard (EPA)	DTXSID70344261
- InChI: InChI=1S/C12H18/c1-7-2-11-3-8(1)10-4-9(7)5-12(11)6-10/h7-12H,1-6H2/t7-,8+,9+,10-,11-,12+ Key: KZNNISMAUNEBPT-KUDAMMAASA-N; InChI=1/C12H18/c1-7-2-11-3-8(1)10-4-9(7)5-12(11)6-10/h7-12H,1-6H2/t7-,8+,9+,10-,11-,12+ Key: KZNNISMAUNEBPT-KUDAMMAABM
- SMILES: C1C2CC3CC1C4CC2CC3C4

Properties
Chemical formula	C_{12}H_{18}
Molar mass	162.276 g·mol^{−1}
Melting point	325 °C (617 °F; 598 K)
Boiling point	Sublimes

Structure
Point group	D_{3h}
Dipole moment	0 D
- Except where otherwise noted, data are given for materials in their standard state (at 25 °C [77 °F], 100 kPa). verify (what is ?) Infobox references

Iceane, colored by symmetry, Carbon in black and blue, hydrogen in white and cyan

Iceane is a saturated polycyclic hydrocarbon with formula C_{12}H_{18}. It has a cage-like molecular structure, whose carbon skeleton can be viewed as three fused cyclohexane rings in the boat conformation; or as two such rings in the chair conformation, connected by three parallel axial bonds. The spatial arrangement of carbon atoms in iceane is the lonsdalite crystalline structure.

The name "iceane" was proposed by the chemist Louis Fieser about a decade before the compound was first prepared. He was carrying out studies on the arrangement of water molecules in ice, when it occurred to him that there could exist a stable hydrocarbon with the above structure.

It is also referred to as wurtzitane, due to its similarity to the wurtzite crystal structure; however, the name "iceane" has precedence.

== See also ==
- Adamantane
- Twistane
- Propellane
- Hexanitrohexaazaisowurtzitane
