= Nickel hydrazine nitrate =

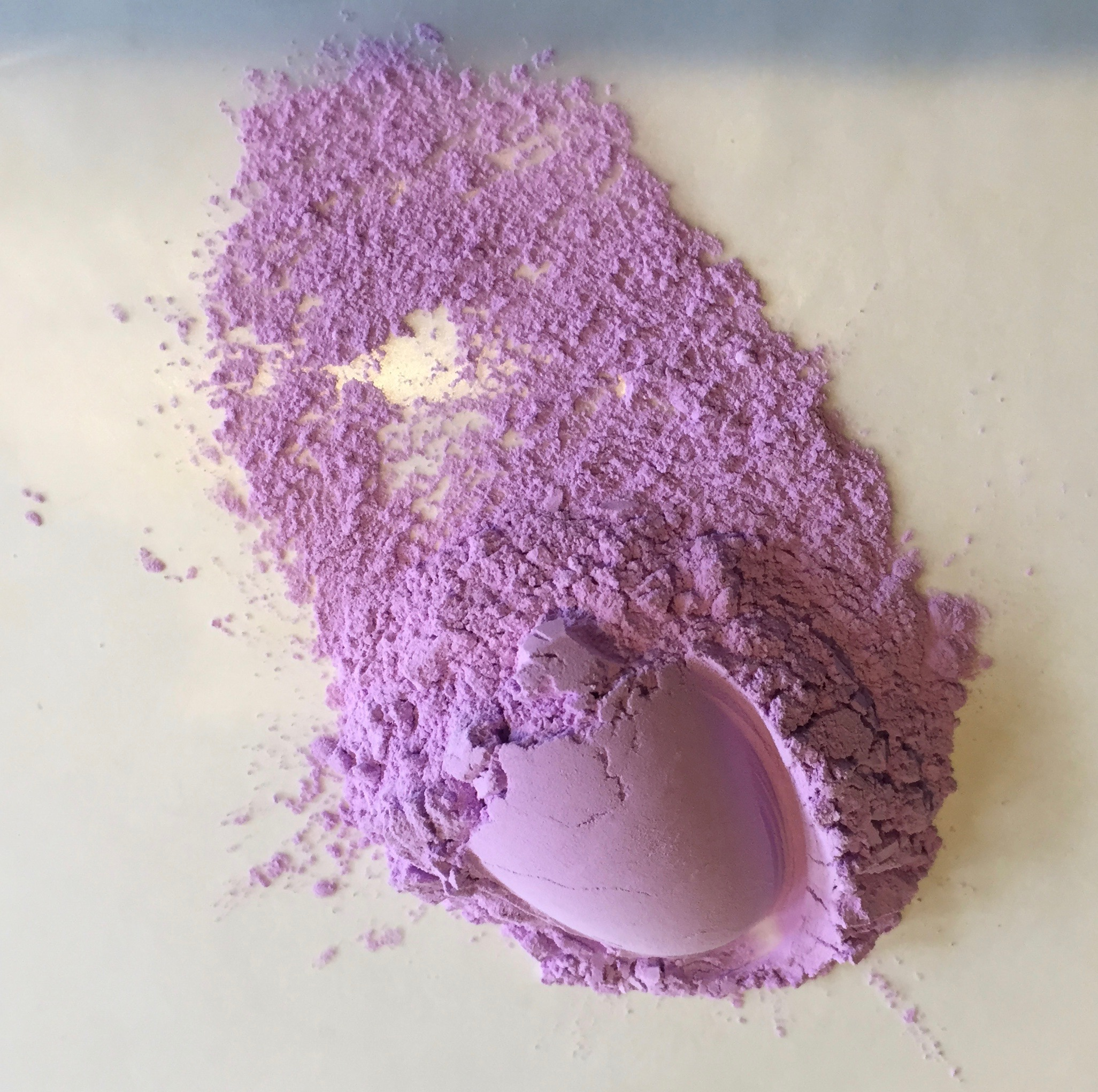
- Nickel Hydrazine Nitrate Properly made (talcum powder like consistency)

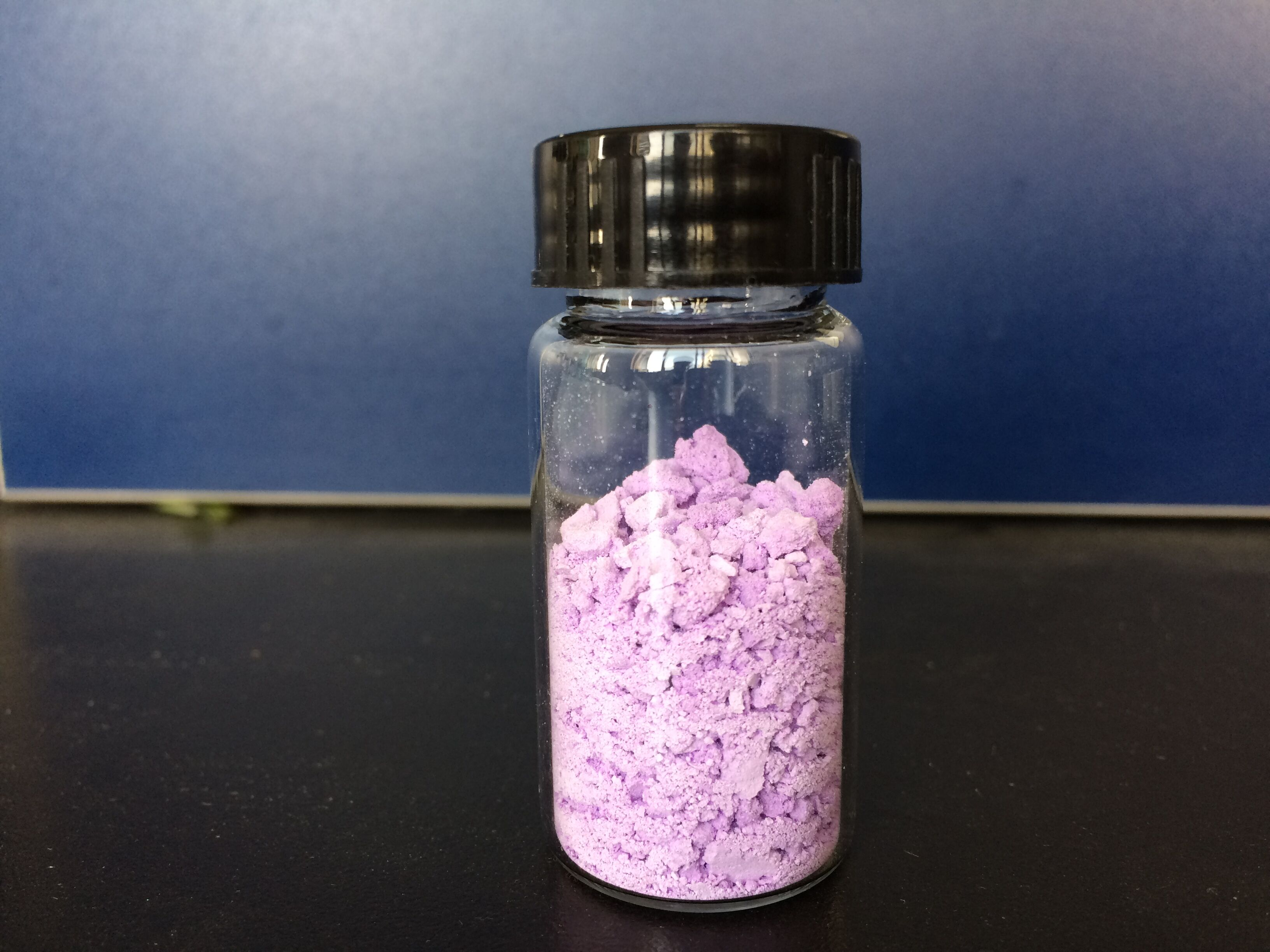
- Nickel hydrazine nitrate sample 2 Improperly made (Hard chunks, grains of sand consistency)

Names
- Other names Tris(hydrazine)nickel(II) nitrate Trihydrazinenickel nitrate NHN

Identifiers
CAS Number	69101-54-8; 82434-34-2
3D model (JSmol)	Interactive image
- InChI: InChI=1S/3H4N2.2NO3.Ni/c3*1-2;2*2-1(3)4;/h3*1-2H2;;;/q;;;2*-1;+2 Key: JUMILXZUBKIILC-UHFFFAOYSA-N
- SMILES: [Ni+2]([NH2]N)([NH2]N)[NH2]N.N(=O)(=O)[O-].N(=O)(=O)[O-]

Properties
Chemical formula	H_{12}N_{8}NiO_{6}
Molar mass	278.839 g·mol^{−1}
Appearance	purple solid
Boiling point	explode

Explosive data
Shock sensitivity	18.82 J
Friction sensitivity	15.6906 N
Detonation velocity	3,600 m/s @ .8 g/cm^{3} 7,000 m/s @ 1.7 g/cm^{3}
RE factor	1.05 @ 1.7 g/cm^{3}

Hazards
NFPA 704 (fire diamond)	1 1 3 OX
Autoignition temperature	219 °C (426 °F; 492 K)
- Except where otherwise noted, data are given for materials in their standard state (at 25 °C [77 °F], 100 kPa). Infobox references

Nickel hydrazine nitrate (NHN), (chemical formula: [Ni(N_{2}H_{4})_{3}](NO_{3})_{2} is an energetic material having explosive properties in between that of primary explosive and a secondary explosive. It is a salt of a coordination compound of nickel.

== Preparation ==
NHN can be synthesized by reacting nickel(II) nitrate hexahydrate with a dilute aqueous solution of hydrazine monohydrate at 65 C.

3N_{2}H_{4}·H_{2}O + Ni(NO_{3})_{2} → [Ni(N_{2}H_{4})_{3}](NO_{3})_{2} + 3H_{2}O

To help speed the drying of the product after filtration from the hot water, it can be rinsed with alcohol. The product is a fluffy powder (density=0.9 g/cm^{3}). To increase its bulk density to (1.2 g/cm^{3}), dextrin in the amount of (1%) of the weight of the nickel(II) nitrate hexahydrate can be added.

== Non-primary explosive detonator (NPED) ==
The sensitivity of NHN straddles the line between highly sensitive primaries and a sensitive secondary, so it can be considered a true non-primary explosive detonator (NPED).

Another benefit of NHN is that it will make the DDT (deflagration to detonation transition) in a cardboard shell, eliminating the danger of shrapnel from a metal shell.

== Safety ==
NHN straddles the line between primary and secondary. Because of this it is a relatively safe explosive to work with having 80x less sensitivity to friction (16.0 N) than lead azide (0.1N) as shown in table 2.

Friction sensitivities of some traditional explosives (lead azide – 0.1N; lead styphnate – 1.5 N; mercury fulminate (white) – 5.0 N; tetrazene – 8.0 N; PETN – 60 N; RDX – 120 N; HMX – 120 N, show that NHN is not very sensitive, and is thereby not exceedingly hazardous in handling.

== General and structural properties of nickel hydrazine nitrate ==
Molecular formula	Ni H_{12} N_{8} O_{6}
Formula weight	278.69
Color	Purple Violet
Crystal density (g/cm^{3})	2.1
Average particle size (μm)	13
Nickel content (%)	21.16 (21.06) ^{a}
Hydrazine content (%)	34.46 (34.45) ^{a}
Nitrate content (%)	44.47 (44.49) ^{a}
Nitrogen content in coordination sphere (%)	30.25 (30.14) ^{a}
FTIR peaks, (cm^{−1})	3238, 1630 (NH_{2}); 1356,1321 (-NO_{3})
Moisture content (at 333 K for 10 min) (%)	0.34
Average mol wt of combustion products	27.35
Percent condensable Ni (l)	18
Oxygen-fuel ratio	0.8571
Oxygen balance %	-5.74

^{a} Values in brackets are theoretical

== Comparative properties of nickel hydrazine nitrate, lead azide and lead styphnate ==
Property	Nickel hydrazine nitrate ^{a}	Lead azide ^{b}	Lead styphnate
Crystal Density (g/cm^{3})	2.129	4.38	3.02
Oxygen balance (%)	– 5.74 ^{c}	– 5.50	-19.00
Heat of combustion (kJ/kg)	5225	2635	5234
Heat of formation (kJ/mol)	– 449	469	-385
Heat of explosion (kJ/kg)	4390	1610	1912
Pressure output in closed vessel (100 mg in 48 cm^{3}) (kg/cm^{2})	17.5	8.2 ^{c}	
Onset of decomposition (K)	505.7	463	533.15
Peak of decomposition (K)	506.5	618	583.15
Friction sensitivity (kg f)	1.6	0.02	.15
Impact sensitivity (cm, 400 g wt, 20 mg sample, 50% explosion)	21 ^{b}	10.5	11
ESD sensitivity (J)	0.02 ^{b}	0.004	.0002
Vol. of detonation gases (ml/g)	884 ^{c}	308	368
Detonation temperature (K)	2342 ^{c}	5600	
Detonation pressure (GPa)	20.8 ^{c} (1.7 g/cm^{3})	16.1 (3.0 g/cm^{3})	
Detonation velocity (m/s)	7000 ^{b} (1.7 g/cm^{3})	4630 (3.0 g/cm^{3})	5200 (2.9 g/cm^{3})
RE Factor	1.05 ^{b} (1.7 g/cm^{3})	.8 (3.0 g/cm^{3})	

^{a} Experimental value, ^{b} literature value, and ^{c} theoretical value
