= HMX =

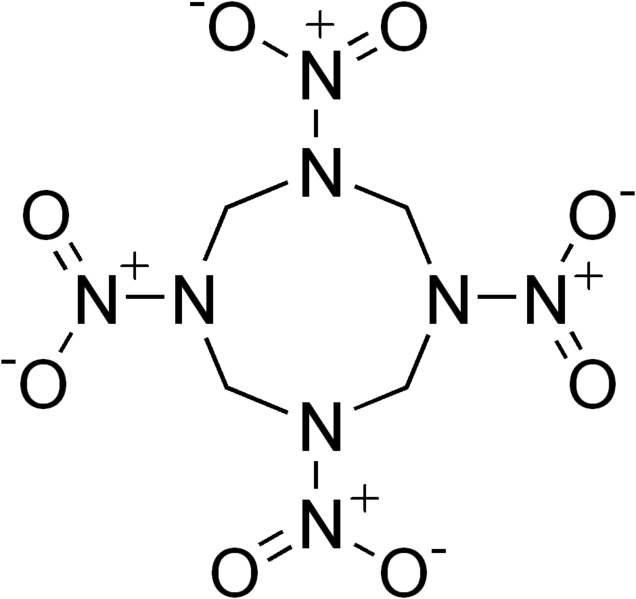

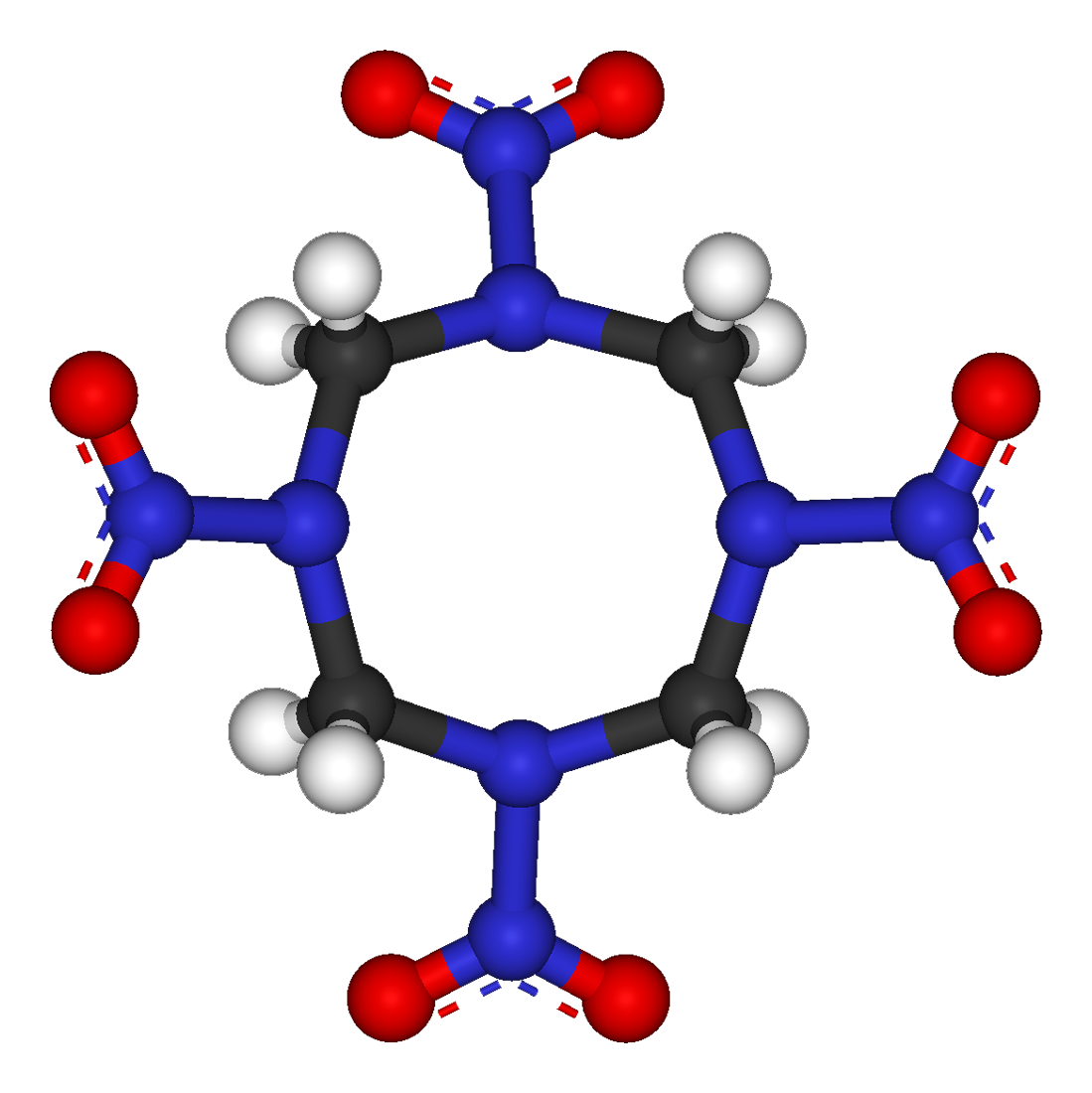

Names
- Preferred IUPAC name 1,3,5,7-Tetranitro-1,3,5,7-tetrazocane
- Other names Octahydro-1,3,5,7-tetranitro-1,3,5,7-tetrazocine; Cyclotetramethylenetetranitramine; Tetrahexamine tetranitramine

Identifiers
CAS Number	2691-41-0
3D model (JSmol)	Interactive image
ChEBI	CHEBI:33176
ChemSpider	16636
ECHA InfoCard	100.018.418
PubChem CID	17596
UNII	LLW94W5BSJ
CompTox Dashboard (EPA)	DTXSID3024237
- InChI: InChI=1S/C4H8N8O8/c13-9(14)5-1-6(10(15)16)3-8(12(19)20)4-7(2-5)11(17)18/h1-4H2 Key: UZGLIIJVICEWHF-UHFFFAOYSA-N; InChI=1/C4H8N8O8/c13-9(14)5-1-6(10(15)16)3-8(12(19)20)4-7(2-5)11(17)18/h1-4H2 Key: UZGLIIJVICEWHF-UHFFFAOYAL
- SMILES: C1N(CN(CN(CN1[N+](=O)[O-])[N+](=O)[O-])[N+](=O)[O-])[N+](=O)[O-]

Properties
Chemical formula	C_{4}H_{8}N_{8}O_{8}
Molar mass	296.155 g/mol
Density	1.95 g/cm^{3}, solid
Melting point	276 to 286 °C (529 to 547 °F; 549 to 559 K)

Explosive data
Shock sensitivity	Low
Friction sensitivity	Low
Detonation velocity	9100 m/s
RE factor	1.70

Hazards
- Occupational safety and health (OHS/OSH)
Main hazards	Explosive
- GHS labelling
Pictograms	(GHS01: Explosive) (GHS06: Toxic)
Signal word	Danger
Hazard statements	H201, H205, H241, H301, H304, H311, H319
Precautionary statements	P210, P250, P280, P370+P380, P372, P373
NFPA 704 (fire diamond)	3 1 3
- Except where otherwise noted, data are given for materials in their standard state (at 25 °C [77 °F], 100 kPa). verify (what is ?) Infobox references

HMX, also called octogen, is a powerful and relatively insensitive nitroamine high explosive chemically related to RDX. The compound's name is the subject of much speculation, having been variously listed as High Melting Explosive, High-velocity Military Explosive, or High-Molecular-weight RDX, as well as Her Majesty's Explosive.

The molecular structure of HMX consists of an eight-membered ring of alternating carbon and nitrogen atoms, with a nitro group attached to each nitrogen atom. Because of its high mass-specific enthalpy of formation, it is one of the most potent chemical explosives manufactured, although a number of newer ones, including HNIW, TKX-50, and ONC, are more powerful.

== Synthesis ==
HMX is more complicated to manufacture than most explosives, and this confines it to specialist applications. It and RDX are both produced by the Bachmann process—nitration of hexamine using a mixture of ammonium nitrate and nitric acid in a mixture of acetic acid and acetic anhydride as solvent—with the major product determined by the specific reaction conditions.

== Applications ==
Also known as cyclotetramethylenetetranitramine, tetrahexamine tetranitramine, or octahydro-1,3,5,7-tetranitro-1,3,5,7-tetrazocine, HMX was first made in 1930. In 1949 it was discovered that HMX can be prepared by nitrolysis of RDX. Nitrolysis of RDX is performed by dissolving RDX in a 55% HNO_{3} solution, followed by placing the solution on a steambath for about six hours. HMX is used almost exclusively in military applications, including as the detonator in nuclear weapons, in the form of polymer-bonded explosive, and as a solid-rocket propellant.

HMX is used in melt-castable explosives when mixed with TNT, which as a class are referred to as "octols". Additionally, polymer-bonded explosive compositions containing HMX are used in the manufacture of missile warheads and armor-piercing shaped charges.

HMX is also used in the process of perforating the steel casing in oil and gas wells. The HMX is built into a shaped charge that is detonated within the wellbore to punch a hole through the steel casing and surrounding cement out into the hydrocarbon-bearing formations. The pathway that is created allows formation fluids to flow into the wellbore and onward to the surface.

The Hayabusa2 space probe used HMX to excavate a hole in an asteroid in order to access material that had not been exposed to the solar wind.

Ongoing research aims to reduce its sensitivity and improve some manufacturing properties.

== Health and environmental fate ==
=== Analytical methods ===
HMX enters the environment through air, water, and soil because it is widely used in military and civil applications. At present, reverse-phase HPLC and more sensitive LC-MS methods have been developed to accurately quantify the concentration of HMX in a variety of matrices in environmental assessments.

=== Toxicity ===
At present, the information needed to determine if HMX causes cancer is insufficient. Due to the lack of information, EPA has determined that HMX is not classifiable as to its human carcinogenicity.

The available data on the effects on human health of exposure to HMX are limited. HMX causes CNS effects similar to those of RDX, but at considerably higher doses. In one study, volunteers submitted to patch testing, which produced skin irritation. Another study of a cohort of 93 workers at an ammunition plant found no hematological, hepatic, autoimmune, or renal diseases. However, the study did not quantify the levels of exposure to HMX.

HMX exposure has been investigated in several studies on animals. Overall, the toxicity appears to be quite low. HMX is poorly absorbed by ingestion. When applied to the dermis, it induces mild skin irritation but not delayed contact sensitization. Various acute and subchronic neurobehavioral effects have been reported in rabbits and rodents, including ataxia, sedation, hyperkinesia, and convulsions. The chronic effects of HMX that have been documented through animal studies include decreased hemoglobin, increased serum alkaline phosphatase, and decreased albumin. Pathological changes were also observed in the animals' livers and kidneys.

Gas exchange rate was used as an indicator of chemical stress in Northern bobwhite quail (Colinus virginianus) eggs, and no evidence of alterations in metabolic rates associated with HMX exposure was observed. No data are available concerning the possible reproductive, developmental, or carcinogenic effects of HMX. HMX is considered less toxic than TNT or RDX. Remediating HMX-contaminated water supplies has proven to be successful.

=== Biodegradation ===
Both wild and transgenic plants can phytoremediate explosives from soil and water.

== See also ==
- 2,4,6-Tris(trinitromethyl)-1,3,5-triazine
- 4,4'-Dinitro-3,3'-diazenofuroxan (DDF)
- Heptanitrocubane (HNC)
- HHTDD
- Octanitrocubane (ONC)
- RE factor
