= Cocrystal =

Special crystals composed of multiple compounds

In materials science (specifically crystallography), cocrystals are "solids that are crystalline, single-phase materials composed of two or more different molecular or ionic compounds generally in a stoichiometric ratio which are neither solvates nor simple salts." A broader definition is that cocrystals "consist of two or more components that form a unique crystalline structure having unique properties." Several subclassifications of cocrystals exist.

Cocrystals can encompass many types of compounds, including hydrates, solvates and clathrates, which represent the basic principle of host–guest chemistry. Hundreds of examples of cocrystallization are reported annually.

== History ==
The first reported cocrystal, quinhydrone, was studied by Friedrich Wöhler in 1844. Quinhydrone is a cocrystal of quinone and hydroquinone (known archaically as quinol). He found that this material was made up of a 1:1 molar combination of the components. Quinhydrone was analyzed by numerous groups over the next decade and several related cocrystals were made from halogenated quinones.

Many cocrystals discovered in the late 1800s and early 1900s were reported in Organische Molekülverbindungen, published by Paul Pfeiffer in 1922. This book separated the cocrystals into two categories; those made of inorganic:organic components, and those made only of organic components. The inorganic:organic cocrystals include organic molecules cocrystallized with alkali and alkaline earth salts, mineral acids, and halogens as in the case of the halogenated quinones. A majority of the organic:organic cocrystals contained aromatic compounds, with a significant fraction containing di- or trinitro aromatic compounds. The existence of several cocrystals containing eucalyptol, a compound which has no aromatic groups, was an important finding which taught scientists that pi stacking is not necessary for the formation of cocrystals.

Cocrystals continued to be discovered throughout the 1900s. Some were discovered by chance and others by screening techniques. Knowledge of the intermolecular interactions and their effects on crystal packing allowed for the engineering of cocrystals with desired physical and chemical properties. In the last decade there has been an enhanced interest in cocrystal research, primarily due to applications in the pharmaceutical industry.

Cocrystals represent about 0.5% of the crystal structures archived in the Cambridge Structural Database (CSD). However, the study of cocrystals has a long history spanning more than 160 years. They have found use in a number of industries, including pharmaceutical, textile, paper, chemical processing, photographic, propellant, and electronic.

== Definition ==
The meaning of the term cocrystal is subject of disagreement. One definition states that a cocrystal is a crystalline structure composed of at least two components, where the components may be atoms, ions or molecules. This definition is sometimes extended to specify that the components be solid in their pure forms at ambient conditions. However, it has been argued that this separation based on ambient phase is arbitrary. A more inclusive definition is that cocrystals "consist of two or more components that form a unique crystalline structure having unique properties." Due to variation in the use of the term, structures such as solvates and clathrates may or may not be considered cocrystals in a given situation. The difference between a crystalline salt and a cocrystal lies merely in the transfer of a proton. The transfer of protons from one component to another in a crystal is dependent on the environment. For this reason, crystalline salts and cocrystals may be thought of as two ends of a proton transfer spectrum, where the salt has completed the proton transfer at one end and an absence of proton transfer exists for cocrystals at the other end.

== Properties ==
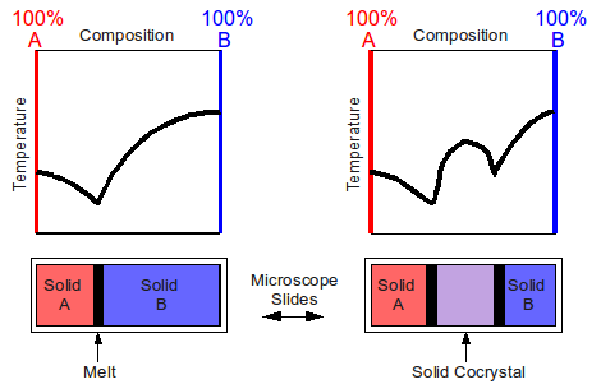
A schematic for the determination of melting point binary phase diagrams from thermal microscopy.

The components interact via non-covalent interactions such as hydrogen bonding, ionic interactions, van der Waals interactions and Π-interactions. These interactions lead to a cocrystal lattice energy that is generally more stable than the crystal structures of the individual components. The intermolecular interactions and resulting crystal structures can generate physical and chemical properties that differ from the properties of the individual components. Such properties include melting point, solubility, chemical stability, and mechanical properties. Some cocrystals have been observed to exist as polymorphs, which may display different physical properties depending on the form of the crystal.

Phase diagrams determined from the "contact method" of thermal microscopy is valuable in the detection of cocrystals. The construction of these phase diagrams is made possible due to the change in melting point upon cocrystallization. Two crystalline substances are deposited on either side of a microscope slide and are sequentially melted and resolidified. This process creates thin films of each substance with a contact zone in the middle. A melting point phase diagram may be constructed by slow heating of the slide under a microscope and observation of the melting points of the various portions of the slide. For a simple binary phase diagram, if one eutectic point is observed then the substances do not form a cocrystal. If two eutectic points are observed, then the composition between these two points corresponds to the cocrystal.

== Production and characterization ==
=== Production ===
There are many synthetic strategies that are available to prepare cocrystals. However, it may be difficult to prepare single cocrystals for X-ray diffraction, as it has been known to take up to 6 months to prepare these materials.

Cocrystals are typically generated through slow evaporation of solutions of the two components. This approach has been successful with molecules of complementary hydrogen bonding properties, in which case cocrystallization is likely to be thermodynamically favored.

Many other methods exist in order to produce cocrystals. Crystallizing with a molar excess of one cocrystal former may produce a cocrystal by a decrease in solubility of that one component. Another method to synthesize cocrystals is to conduct the crystallization in a slurry. As with any crystallization, solvent considerations are important. Changing the solvent will change the intermolecular interactions and possibly lead to cocrystal formation. Also, by changing the solvent, phase considerations may be utilized. The role of a solvent in nucleation of cocrystals remains poorly understood but critical in order to obtain a cocrystal from solution.

Cooling molten mixture of cocrystal formers often affords cocrystals. Seeding can be useful. Another approach that exploits phase change is sublimation which often forms hydrates.

Grinding, both heat and liquid-assisted, is employed to produce cocrystal, e.g., using a mortar and pestle, using a ball mill, ResonantAcoustic mixer, or using a vibratory mill. In liquid-assisted grinding, or kneading, a small or substoichiometric amount of liquid (solvent) is added to the grinding mixture. This method was developed in order to increase the rate of cocrystal formation, but has advantages over neat grinding such as increased yield, ability to control polymorph production, better product crystallinity, and applies to a significantly larger scope of cocrystal formers. and nucleation through seeding.

Supercritical fluids (SCFs) serve as a medium for growing cocrystals. Crystal growth is achieved due to unique properties of SCFs by using different supercritical fluid properties: supercritical CO_{2} solvent power, anti-solvent effect and its atomization enhancement.

Using intermediate phases to synthesize solid-state compounds is also employed. The use of a hydrate or an amorphous phase as an intermediate during synthesis in a solid-state route has proven successful in forming a cocrystal. Also, the use of a metastable polymorphic form of one cocrystal former can be employed. In this method, the metastable form acts as an unstable intermediate on the nucleation pathway to a cocrystal. As always, a clear connection between pairwise components of the cocrystal is needed in addition to the thermodynamic requirements in order to form these compounds.

Importantly, the phase that is obtained is independent of the synthetic methodology used. It may seem facile to synthesize these materials, but on the contrary the synthesis is far from routine.

=== Characterization ===
Cocrystals may be characterized in a wide variety of ways. Powder X-Ray diffraction proves to be the most commonly used method in order to characterize cocrystals. It is easily seen that a unique compound is formed and if it could possibly be a cocrystal or not owing to each compound having its own distinct powder diffractogram. Single-crystal X-ray diffraction may prove difficult on some cocrystals, especially those formed through grinding, as this method more often than not provides powders. However, these forms may be formed often through other methodologies in order to afford single crystals.

Aside from common spectroscopic methods such as FT-IR and Raman spectroscopy, solid state NMR spectroscopy allows differentiation of chiral and racemic cocrystals of similar structure.

Other physical methods of characterization may be employed. Thermogravimetric analysis (TGA) and differential scanning calorimetry (DSC) are two commonly used methods in order to determine melting points, phase transitions, and enthalpic factors which can be compared to each individual cocrystal former.

== Applications ==
Cocrystal engineering is relevant to production of energetic materials, pharmaceuticals, and other compounds. Of these, the most widely studied and used application is in drug development and more specifically, the formation, design, and implementation of active pharmaceutical ingredients (API). Changing the structure and composition of the API can greatly influence the bioavailability of a drug. The engineering of cocrystals takes advantage of the specific properties of each component to make the most favorable conditions for solubility that could ultimately enhance the bioavailability of the drug. The principal idea is to develop superior physico-chemical properties of the API while holding the properties of the drug molecule itself constant. Cocrystal structures have also become a staple for drug discovery. Structure-based virtual screening methods, such as docking, makes use of cocrystal structures of known proteins or receptors to elucidate new ligand-receptor binding conformations.

=== Pharmaceuticals ===
Cocrystal engineering has become of such great importance in the field of pharmaceuticals that a particular subdivision of multicomponent cocrystals has been given the term pharmaceutical cocrystals to refer to a solid cocrystal former component and a molecular or ionic API (active pharmaceutical ingredient). However, other classifications also exist when one or more of the components are not in solid form under ambient conditions. For example, if one component is a liquid under ambient conditions, the cocrystal might actually be deemed a cocrystal solvate as discussed previously. The physical states of the individual components under ambient conditions is the only source of division among these classifications. The classification naming scheme of the cocrystals might seem to be of little importance to the cocrystal itself, but in the categorization lies significant information regarding the physical properties, such as solubility and melting point, and the stability of APIs.

The objective for pharmaceutical cocrystals is to have properties that differ from that expected of the pure APIs without making and/or breaking covalent bonds. Among the earliest pharmaceutical cocrystals reported are of sulfonamides. The area of pharmaceutical cocrystals has thus increased on the basis of interactions between APIs and cocrystal formers. Most commonly, APIs have hydrogen-bonding capability at their exterior which makes them more susceptible to polymorphism, especially in the case of cocrystal solvates which can be known to have different polymorphic forms. Such a case is in the drug sulfathiazole, a common oral and topical antimicrobial, which has over a hundred different solvates. It is thus important in the field of pharmaceuticals to screen for every polymorphic form of a cocrystal before it is considered as a realistic improvement to the existing API. Pharmaceutical cocrystal formation can also be driven by multiple functional groups on the API, which introduces the possibility of binary, ternary, and higher ordered cocrystal forms. Nevertheless, the cocrystal former is used to optimize the properties of the API but can also be used solely in the isolation and/or purification of the API, such as a separating enantiomers from each other, as well and removed preceding the production of the drug.

It is with reasoning that the physical properties of pharmaceutical cocrystals could then ultimately change with varying amounts and concentrations of the individual components. One of the most important properties to change with varying the concentrations of the components is solubility. It has been shown that if the stability of the components is less than the cocrystal formed between them, then the solubility of the cocrystal will be lower than the pure combination of the individual constituents. If the solubility of the cocrystal is lower, this means that there exists a driving force for the cocrystallization to occur. Even more important for pharmaceutical applications is the ability to alter the stability to hydration and bioavailability of the API with cocrystal formation, which has huge implications on drug development. The cocrystal can increase or decrease such properties as melting point and stability to relative humidity compared to the pure API and therefore, must be studied on a case to case basis for their utilization in improving a pharmaceutical on the market.

A screening procedure has been developed to help determine the formation of cocrystals from two components and the ability to improve the properties of the pure API. First, the solubilities of the individual compounds are determined. Secondly, the cocrystallization of the two components is evaluated. Finally, phase diagram screening and powder X-ray diffraction (PXRD) are further investigated to optimize conditions for cocrystallization of the components. This procedure is still done to discover cocrystals of pharmaceutical interest including simple APIs, such as carbamazepine (CBZ), a common treatment for epilepsy, trigeminal neuralgia, and bipolar disorder. CBZ has only one primary functional group involved in hydrogen bonding, which simplifies the possibilities of cocrystal formation that can greatly improve its low dissolution bioavailability.

Another example of an API being studied would be that of Piracetam, or (2-oxo-1-pyrrolidinyl)acetamide, which is used to stimulate the central nervous system and thus, enhance learning and memory. Four polymorphs of Piracetam exist that involve hydrogen bonding of the carbonyl and primary amide. It is these same hydrogen bonding functional groups that interact with and enhance the cocrystallization of Piracetam with gentisic acid, a non-steroidal anti-inflammatory drug (NSAID), and with p-hydroxybenzoic acid, an isomer of the aspirin precursor salicylic acid. No matter what the API is that is being researched, it is quite evident of the wide applicability and possibility for constant improvement in the realm of drug development, thus making it clear that the driving force of cocrystallization continues to consist of attempting to improve on the physical properties in which the existing cocrystals are lacking.

=== Regulation ===
On August 16, 2016, the US food and drug administration (FDA) published a draft guidance Regulatory Classification of Pharmaceutical Co-Crystals. In this guide, the FDA suggests treating co-crystals as polymorphs, as long as proof is presented to rule out the existence of ionic bonds.

=== Energetic materials ===
Two explosives HMX and CL-20 cocrystallized in a ratio 1:2 to form a hybrid explosive. This explosive had the same low sensitivity of HMX and nearly the same explosive power of CL-20. Physically mixing explosives creates a mixture that has the same sensitivity as the most sensitive component, which cocrystallisation overcomes.

== See also ==
- Crystallization
