= Hexanitrobenzene =

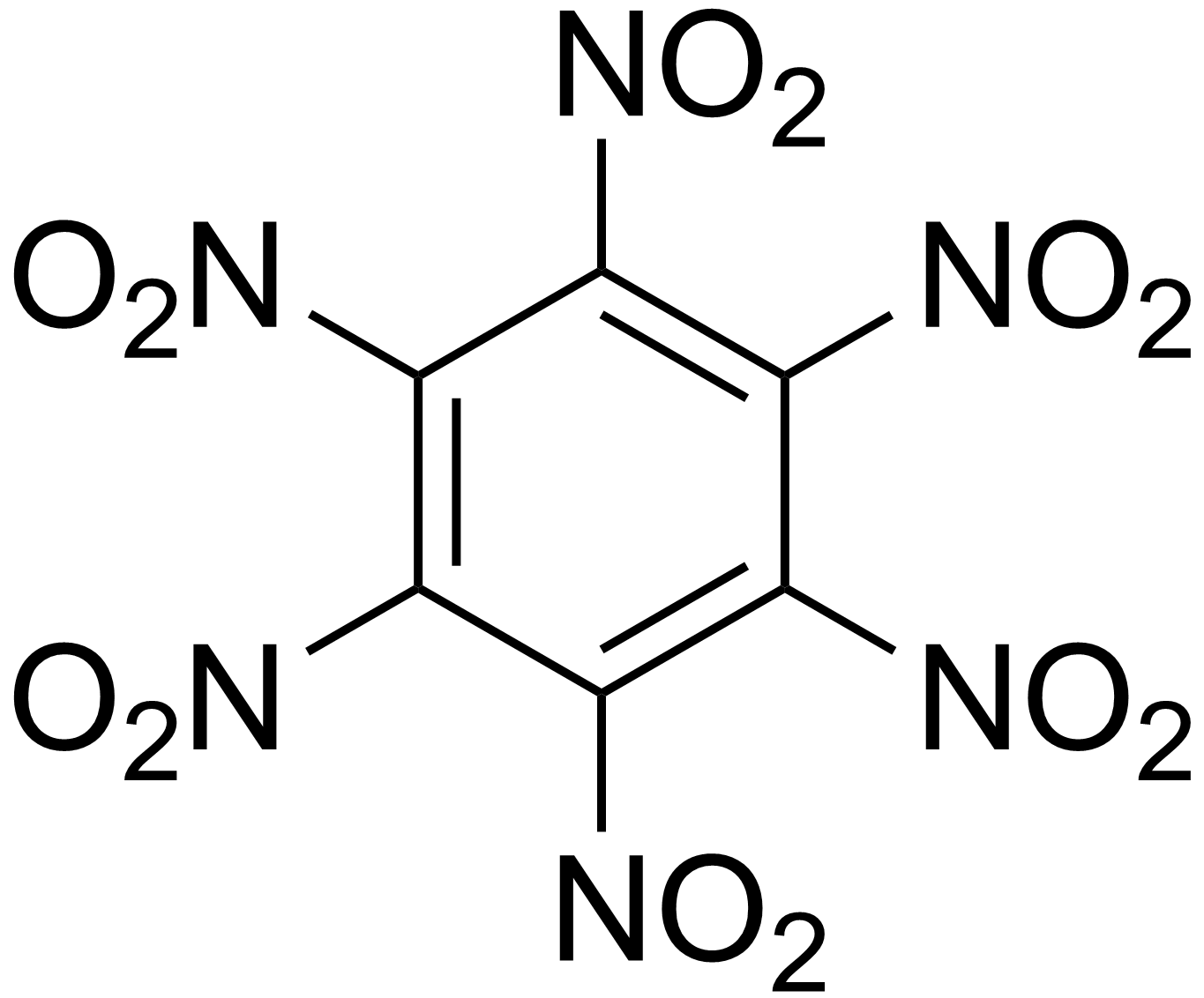

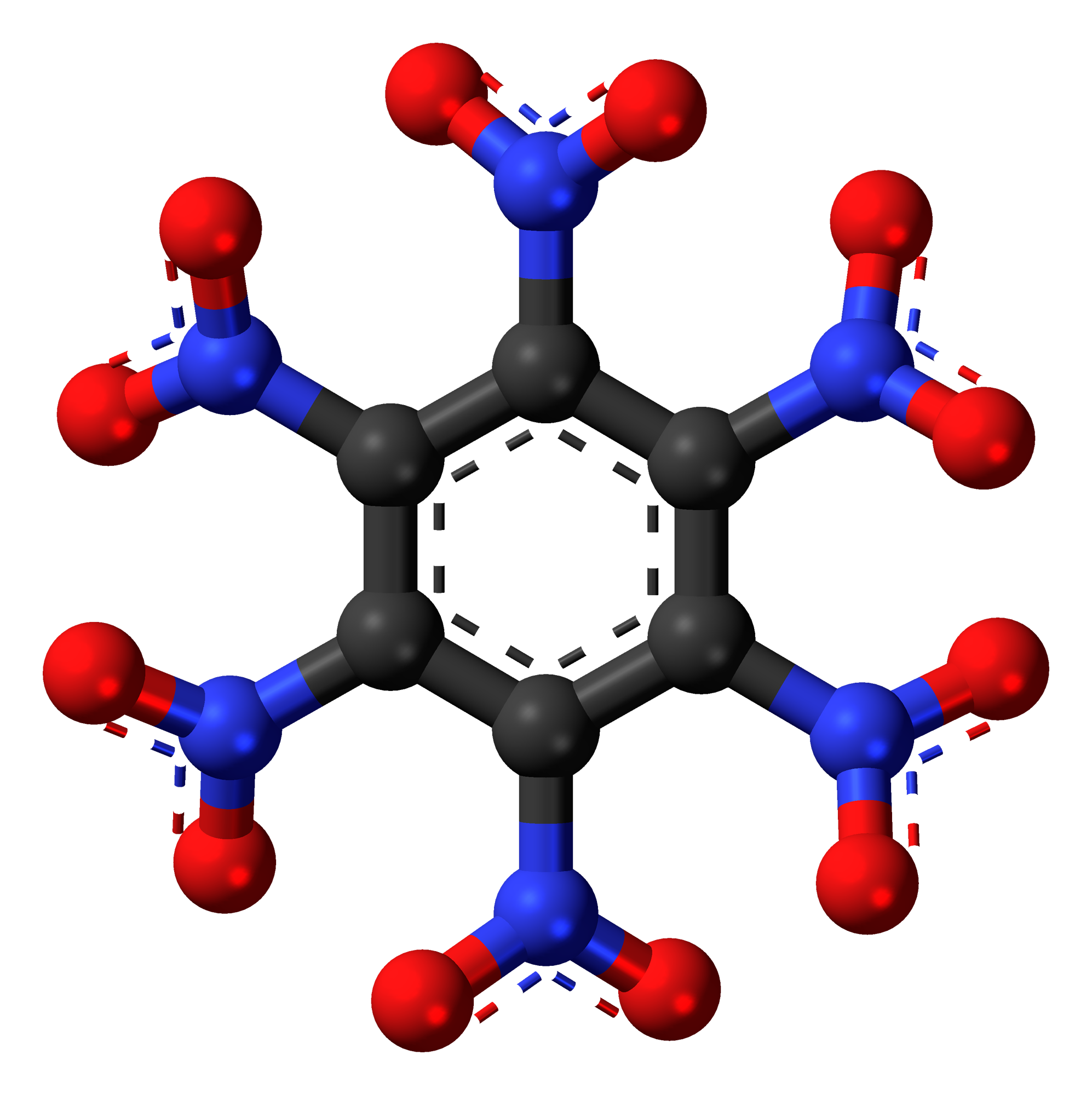

Names
- Preferred IUPAC name Hexanitrobenzene
- Other names 1,2,3,4,5,6-Hexanitrobenzene

Identifiers
CAS Number	13232-74-1
3D model (JSmol)	Interactive image
ChemSpider	10445694
PubChem CID	12488953
UNII	69FN42H7T4
CompTox Dashboard (EPA)	DTXSID90893766
- InChI: InChI=1S/C6N6O12/c13-7(14)1-2(8(15)16)4(10(19)20)6(12(23)24)5(11(21)22)3(1)9(17)18 Key: BVKZIAODKDJPLW-UHFFFAOYSA-N; InChI=1/C6N6O12/c13-7(14)1-2(8(15)16)4(10(19)20)6(12(23)24)5(11(21)22)3(1)9(17)18 Key: BVKZIAODKDJPLW-UHFFFAOYAP
- SMILES: c1(c(c(c(c(c1[N+](=O)[O-])[N+](=O)[O-])[N+](=O)[O-])[N+](=O)[O-])[N+](=O)[O-])[N+](=O)[O-]

Properties
Chemical formula	C_{6}N_{6}O_{12}
Molar mass	348.10 g/mol
Appearance	Yellow or brown powdered crystals
Density	1.985 g/cm^{3}
Melting point	256 to 264 °C (493 to 507 °F; 529 to 537 K)

Explosive data
Shock sensitivity	None
Friction sensitivity	None
Detonation velocity	9,340 m/s
RE factor	1.8
- Except where otherwise noted, data are given for materials in their standard state (at 25 °C [77 °F], 100 kPa). verify (what is ?) Infobox references

Hexanitrobenzene, also known as HNB, is a nitrobenzene compound in which six nitro groups are bonded to all six positions of a central benzene ring. It is a high-density explosive compound with chemical formula C_{6}N_{6}O_{12}, obtained by oxidizing the amine group of pentanitroaniline with hydrogen peroxide in sulfuric acid.

== Properties ==
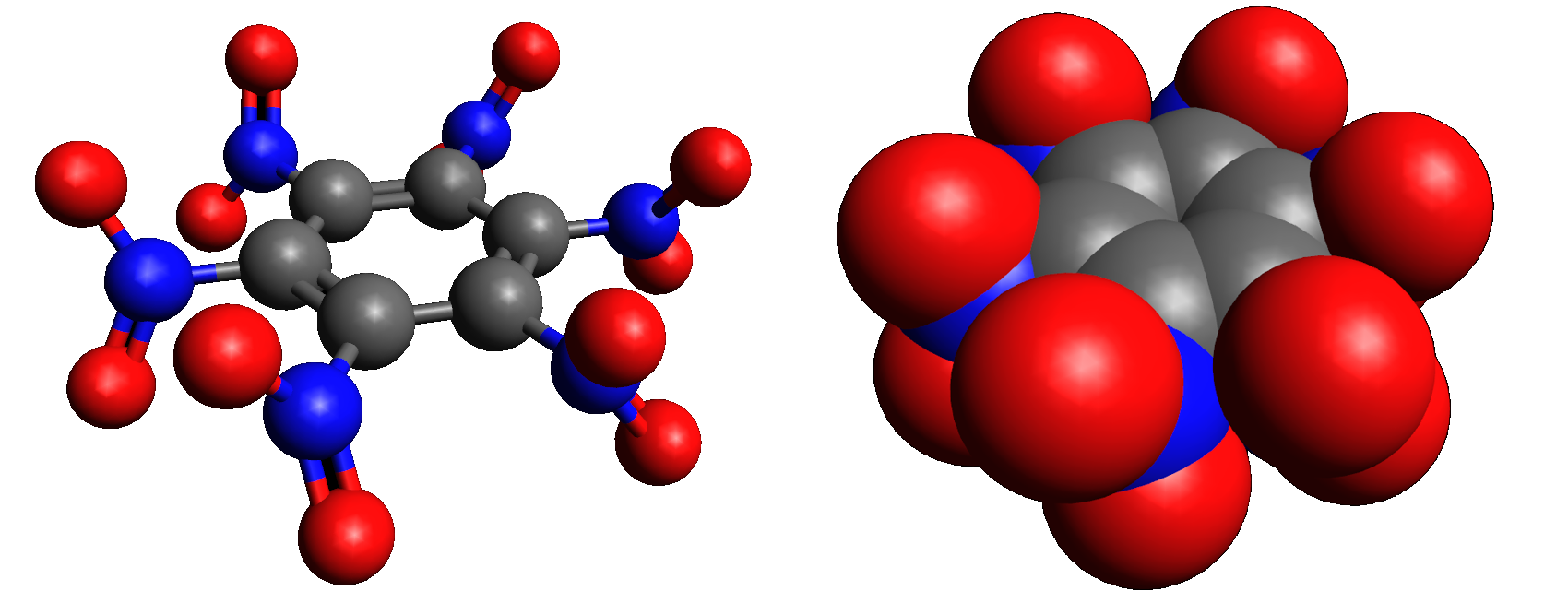
Perspective view of the crystal structure of hexanitrobenzene, showing the rotation of the nitro groups. Left: Ball-and-stick structure. Right: van der Waals space-filling structure.

The stable conformation of this molecule has the nitro groups rotated out of the plane of the central benzene ring. The molecule adopts a propeller-like conformation in which the nitro groups are rotated about 53° from planar.

HNB has the undesirable property of being moderately sensitive to light and, therefore, hard to utilize safely. As of 2021, it is not used in any production explosives applications, though it is used as a precursor chemical in one method of production of TATB, a much more insensitive explosive.

HNB was experimentally used as a gas source for explosively pumped gas dynamic laser. In this application, HNB and tetranitromethane are preferred to more conventional explosives because the explosion products CO_{2} and N_{2} are a simple enough mixture to simulate gas dynamic processes and quite similar to conventional gas dynamic laser medium. The water and hydrogen products of many other explosives could interfere with vibrational states of CO_{2} in this type of laser.

== Preparation ==
During World War II, a method of synthesis of hexanitrobenzene was suggested in Germany, and the product was supposed to be manufactured on a semi-industrial scale according to the following scheme:

C_{6}H_{3}(NO_{2})_{3} → C_{6}H_{3}(NHOH)_{3} (partial reduction)
C_{6}H_{3}(NHOH)_{3} → C_{6}(NO_{2})_{3}(NHOH)_{3} (nitration)
C_{6}(NO_{2})_{3}(NHOH)_{3} → C_{6}(NO_{2})_{6} (oxidation)

Direct complete nitration of benzene is practically impossible because the nitro groups are deactivating groups for further nitration. The nitro groups of 1,3,5-trinitrobenzene are converted to the less deactivating hydroxylamino groups, allowing for complete substitution of the ring upon nitration.

== Additional properties ==
- Chapman-Jouget detonation pressure: 43 GPa
- Crystal Density: 2.01

== See also ==
- ONC
- 4,4'-Dinitro-3,3'-diazenofuroxan (DDF)
- Octaazacubane (N8)
- Hexanitrohexaazaisowurtzitane (HNIW)
- Tetryl
- TNT
- RE factor
