= Gas dynamic laser =

Laser based on differences in relaxation velocities of molecular vibrational states

A gas dynamic laser (GDL) is a laser based on differences in relaxation velocities of molecular vibrational states. The lasing medium gas has such properties that an energetically lower vibrational state relaxes faster than a higher vibrational state, and so a population inversion is achieved in a particular time. It was invented by Edward Gerry and Arthur Kantrowitz at Avco Everett Research Laboratory in 1966.

Pure gas dynamic lasers usually use a combustion chamber, supersonic expansion nozzle, and CO_{2}, in a mixture with nitrogen or helium, as the laser medium.

Gas dynamic lasers can be pumped by combustion or adiabatic expansion of gas. Any hot and compressed gas with appropriate vibrational structure could be utilized.

The explosively pumped gas dynamic laser is a version of GDL pumped by expansion of explosion products. Hexanitrobenzene and/or tetranitromethane with metal powder is the preferred explosive. This device could have very high pulsed peak power output suitable for laser weapons.

== Function ==
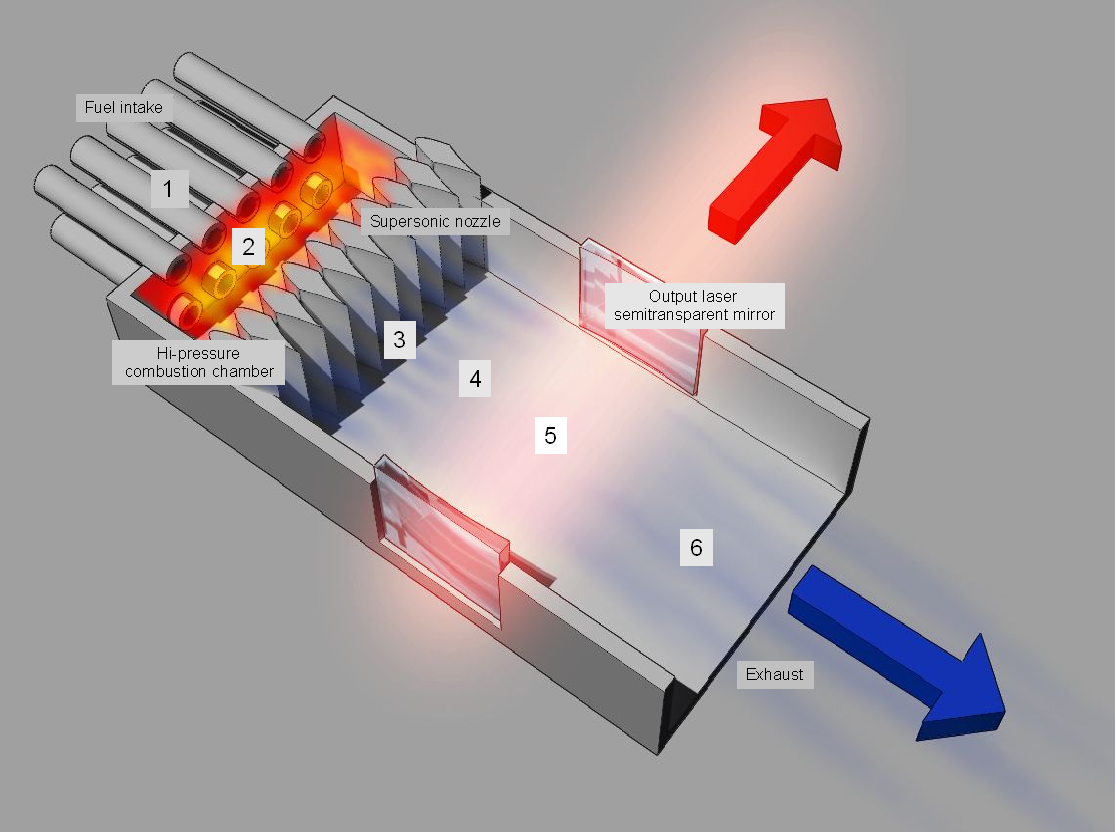
Gas dynamic laser components and function

1. Hot compressed gas is generated.
2. Gas expands through subsonic or supersonic expansion nozzle, the temperature of the gas becomes lower and according to Maxwell–Boltzmann distribution the gas isn't in thermodynamic equilibrium until the vibrational states relax.
3. The gas flows through the tube of a particular length for a particular time. In this time lower vibrational state does relax but higher vibrational state doesn't. Thus population inversion is achieved.
4. Gas flows through mirror area where stimulated emission takes place.
5. Gas returns to equilibrium and becomes warm. It must be removed from the laser cavity or it will interfere with the thermodynamics and vibrational state relaxation of the freshly expanded gas.

== Application ==
Almost any chemical laser uses gas-dynamic processes to increase its efficiency.

High energy efficiency (as high as 30%) and very high power output make GDL suitable for some (especially military) applications.

== See also ==
- Gas laser
- Chemical laser
- Carbon-dioxide laser
