= Philip Eaton =

American chemist (1936–2023)

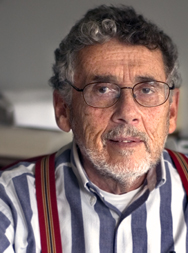

Philip E. Eaton (June 2, 1936 – July 21, 2023) was an American chemist. He served as Professor Emeritus of Chemistry at the University of Chicago. Eaton and his fellow researchers were the first to synthesize the "impossible" cubane molecule in 1964.

== Early life and education ==
Philip E. Eaton was born on June 2, 1936 in Brooklyn, New York. When Eaton was seven his family relocated to Budd Lake, New Jersey. Here he began attending Roxbury Grammar School and later Roxbury High School. It was during these high school years that he began to find his passion for science. It was the support of his parents and teachers that helped him decide to study chemistry.

Eaton attended Princeton University seeking a major in chemistry. Eaton received his B.A. in 1957 before attending Harvard University and earning his M.A. in 1960 and Ph.D. in 1961. During his time in school he became familiar with cage chemistry, specifically Kepone.

== Teaching experience ==
Upon graduating from Harvard Eaton accepted an assistant professorship position at the University of California, Berkeley. During this time he taught introductory organic chemistry. In 1962, he transferred to the University of Chicago where he remained as Professor Emeritus until his death in 2023.

== Research ==
After arriving at University of Chicago Eaton began his research which he is now most well known for, cubane synthesis. In 1964 Eaton and Thomas W. Cole Jr. synthesized the "impossible" cubane molecule. It was given this name because of its unusual cubic geometry. Many scientists believed that the 90 degree bond-angles would be too strained to allow this molecule to form. He later studied larger prismanes.

Working with Mao-Xi Zhang he is reported as having been the first to make octanitrocubane (their paper was published in the year 2003). Because of its eight nitro groups and highly strained C-C bonds, octanitrocubane is a very powerful high explosive.

== Death ==
Philip Eaton died on July 21, 2023, at the age of 87.

== Awards ==
- Alfred P. Sloan Foundation Fellow (1963)
- Research Award, Rohm and Haas Company (1975)
- Alexander von Humboldt Prize (1985)
- Alan Berman Research Rublication Award, Naval Research Laboratory, U.S. Navy (1995)
- Arthur C. Cope Scholar Award, American Chemical Society (1997)
