= Hexanitrohexaazaisowurtzitane =

Partially condensed, stereo, skeletal formula of hexanitrohexaazaisowurtzitane
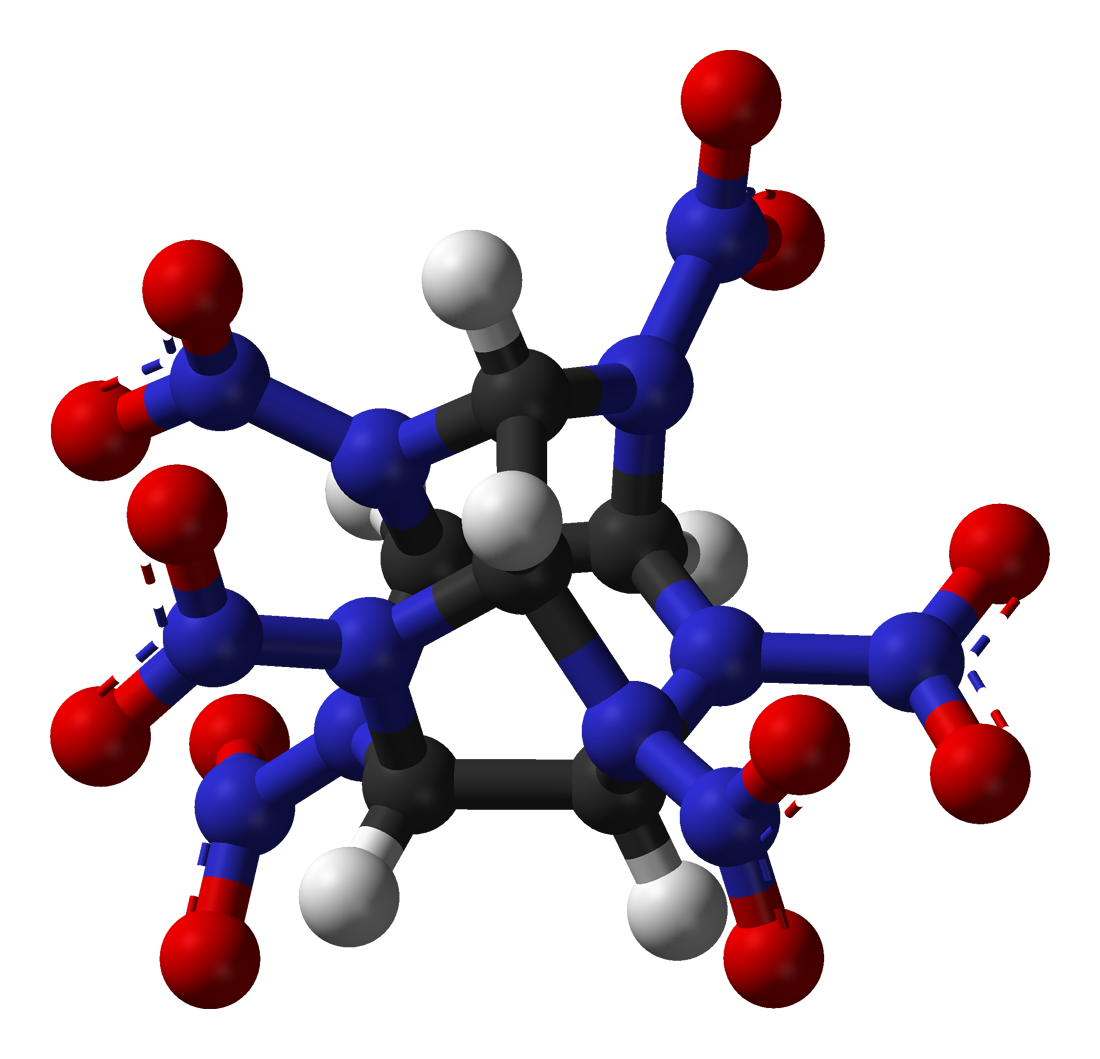
Ball and stick model of hexazaisowurtzitane

Names
- IUPAC name 2,4,6,8,10,12-Hexanitro-2,4,6,8,10,12-hexaazatetracyclo[5.5.0.0^{3,11}.0^{5,9}]dodecane
- Other names: CL-20; Hexanitrohexaazaisowurtzitane; 2,4,6,8,10,12-Hexanitro-2,4,6,8,10,12-hexaazaisowurtzitane; Octahydro-1,3,4,7,8,10-hexanitro-5,2,6-(iminomethenimino)-1H-imidazo[4,5-b]pyrazine; HNIW

Identifiers
CAS Number	135285-90-4
3D model (JSmol)	Interactive image
Abbreviations	CL-20, HNIW
ChEBI	CHEBI:77327
ChemSpider	8064994; 9223599 (3R,9R)-dodec; 9594121 (3R,5S,9R,11S)- dodec
ECHA InfoCard	100.114.169
PubChem CID	9889323; 11048432 (3R,9R)-dodec; 11419235 (3R,5S,9R,11S)- dodec
UNII	RQM82X0CL7
CompTox Dashboard (EPA)	DTXSID90873482
- InChI: InChI=1S/C6H6N12O12/c19-13(20)7-1-2-8(14(21)22)5(7)6-9(15(23)24)3(11(1)17(27)28)4(10(6)16(25)26)12(2)18(29)30/h1-6H Key: NDYLCHGXSQOGMS-UHFFFAOYSA-N
- SMILES: [O-][N+](=O)N1C2C3N(C4C(N3[N+]([O-])=O)N(C(C1N4[N+]([O-])=O)N2[N+]([O-])=O)[N+]([O-])=O)[N+]([O-])=O

Properties
Chemical formula	C_{6}N_{12}H_{6}O_{12}
Molar mass	438.1850 g mol^{−1}
Density	2.044 g cm^{−3}

Explosive data
Detonation velocity	9,500 m/s
RE factor	1.9
- Except where otherwise noted, data are given for materials in their standard state (at 25 °C [77 °F], 100 kPa). verify (what is ?) Infobox references

Hexanitrohexaazaisowurtzitane, also called HNIW and CL-20, is a polycyclic nitroamine explosive with the formula C_{6}H_{6}N_{12}O_{12}. It has a better oxidizer-to-fuel ratio than conventional HMX or RDX. It releases 20% more energy than traditional HMX-based propellants.

== History and use ==
In the 1980s, CL-20 was developed by the China Lake facility, primarily to be used in propellants.

While most development of CL-20 has been fielded by the Thiokol Corporation, the US Navy (through Office of Naval Research (ONR)) has also been interested in CL-20 for use in rocket propellants, such as for missiles, as it has lower observability characteristics such as less visible smoke.

Thus far, CL-20 has only been used in the AeroVironment Switchblade 300 "kamikaze" drone, but is undergoing testing for use in the Lockheed Martin [LMT] AGM-158C Long Range Anti-Ship Missile (LRASM) and AGM-158B Joint Air-to-Surface Standoff Missile-Extended Range (JASSM-ER).

CL-20 was used in the 2024 Lebanon electronic device attacks.

The Indian Armed Forces have also looked into CL-20.

The Taiwanese National Chung-Shan Institute of Science and Technology inaugurated a CL-20 production facility in 2022 with reported integration into the Hsiung Feng II (HF-2) and Hsiung Feng III (HF-3) product lines.

== Synthesis ==
Synthesis of CL20

First, benzylamine (1) is condensed with glyoxal (2) under acidic and dehydrating conditions to yield the first intermediate compound (3). Four benzyl groups selectively undergo hydrogenolysis using palladium on carbon and hydrogen. The amino groups are then acetylated during the same step using acetic anhydride as the solvent (4). Finally, compound 4 is reacted with nitronium tetrafluoroborate and nitrosonium tetrafluoroborate, resulting in HNIW.

== Cocrystals ==
In August 2011, Adam Matzger and Onas Bolton published results showing that a cocrystal of CL-20 and TNT had twice the stability of CL-20—safe enough to transport, but when heated to 136 °C (277 °F) the cocrystal may separate into liquid TNT and a crystal form of CL-20 with structural defects that is somewhat less stable than CL-20.

In August 2012, Onas Bolton et al. published results showing that a cocrystal of 2 parts CL-20 and 1 part HMX had similar safety properties to HMX, but with a greater firing power closer to CL-20.

== Polymeric derivatives ==
In 2017, K.P. Katin and M.M. Maslov designed one-dimensional covalent chains based on the CL-20 molecules. Such chains were constructed using CH_{2} molecular bridges for the covalent bonding between the isolated CL-20 fragments. It was theoretically predicted that their stability increased with efficient length growth. A year later, M.A. Gimaldinova and colleagues demonstrated the versatility of CH_{2} molecular bridges. It is shown that the use of CH_{2} bridges is the universal technique to connect both CL-20 fragments in the chain and the chains together to make a network (linear or zigzag). It is confirmed that the increase of the effective sizes and dimensionality of the CL-20 covalent systems leads to their thermodynamic stability growth. Therefore, the formation of CL-20 crystalline covalent solids seems to be energetically favorable, and CL-20 molecules are capable of forming not only molecular crystals but bulk covalent structures as well. Numerical calculations of CL-20 chains and networks' electronic characteristics revealed that they were wide-bandgap semiconductors.

== See also ==
- 2,4,6-Tris(trinitromethyl)-1,3,5-triazine
- 4,4'-Dinitro-3,3'-diazenofuroxan (DDF)
- Hexanitrobenzene (HNB)
- Heptanitrocubane (HNC)
- HHTDD
- Octaazacubane (N8)
- Iceane (Wurtzitane)
- Octanitrocubane (ONC)
- RE factor
- TEX (explosive)
- TKX-50
