= Heptanitrocubane =

- Structural formula

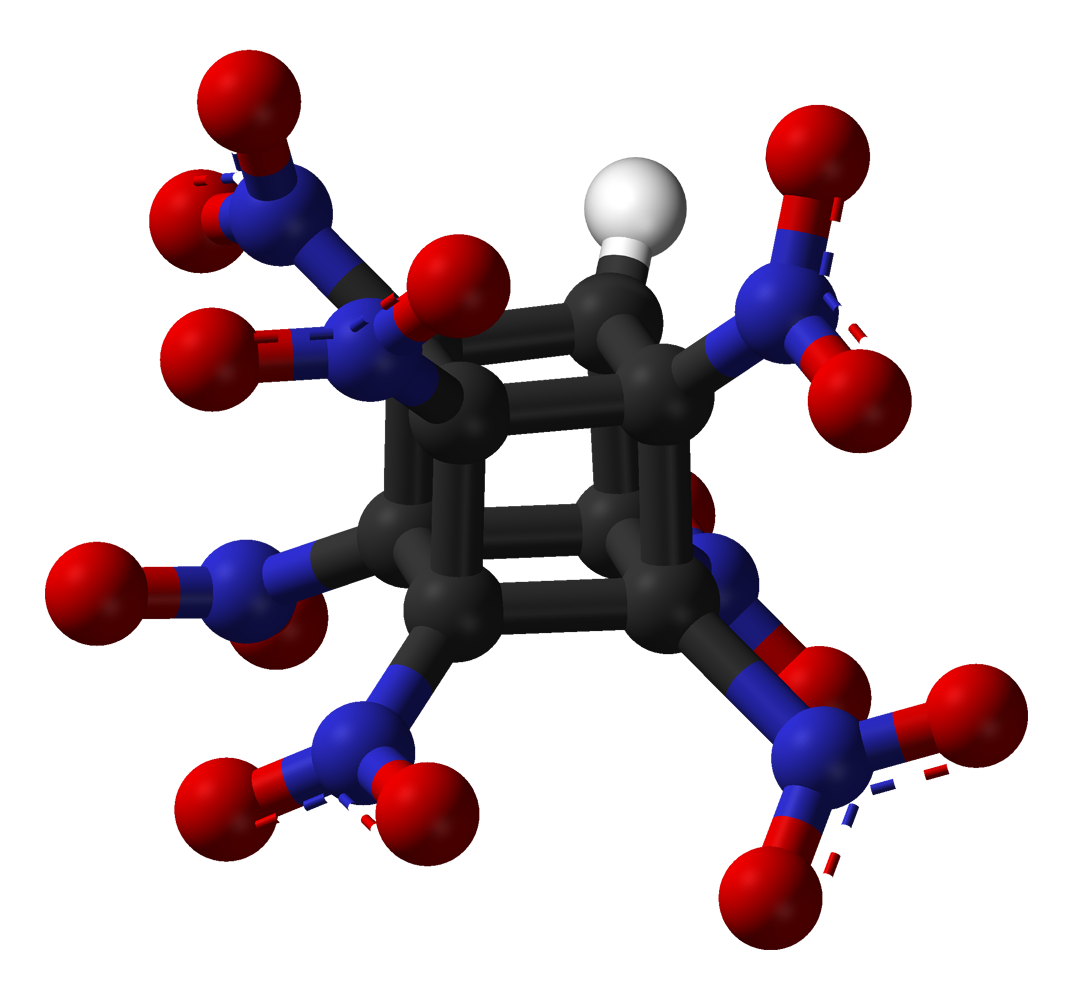
- Ball-and-stick model

Names
- Preferred IUPAC name 1,2,3,4,5,6,7-Heptanitrocubane

Identifiers
CAS Number	99393-62-1
3D model (JSmol)	Interactive image
ChemSpider	9907240
PubChem CID	11732527
CompTox Dashboard (EPA)	DTXSID70471268
- InChI: InChI=1S/C8HN7O14/c16-9(17)2-1-3(10(18)19)5(2,12(22)23)8(15(28)29)6(2,13(24)25)4(1,11(20)21)7(3,8)14(26)27/h1H Key: GUPWSTKEIMSQHI-UHFFFAOYSA-N; InChI=1/C8HN7O14/c16-9(17)2-1-3(10(18)19)5(2,12(22)23)8(15(28)29)6(2,13(24)25)4(1,11(20)21)7(3,8)14(26)27/h1H Key: GUPWSTKEIMSQHI-UHFFFAOYAQ
- SMILES: [O-][N+](=O)C14C3C2([N+]([O-])=O)C1([N+]([O-])=O)C5([N+]([O-])=O)C2([N+]([O-])=O)C3([N+]([O-])=O)C45[N+]([O-])=O

Properties
Chemical formula	C_{8}HN_{7}O_{14}
Molar mass	419.131 g·mol^{−1}

Hazards
- Occupational safety and health (OHS/OSH)
Main hazards	Explosive

Related compounds
Related compounds	Cubane; Octanitrocubane; 2,4,6-Tris(trinitromethyl)-1,3,5-triazine; 4,4'-Dinitro-3,3'-diazenofuroxan; Hexanitrohexaazaisowurtzitane
- Except where otherwise noted, data are given for materials in their standard state (at 25 °C [77 °F], 100 kPa). verify (what is ?) Infobox references

Heptanitrocubane /ˌhɛptəˌnaɪtroʊˈkjuːbeɪn/ is an experimental high explosive based on the cubic eight-carbon cubane molecule and closely related to octanitrocubane. Seven of the eight hydrogen atoms at the corners of the cubane molecule are replaced by nitro groups, giving the final molecular formula C_{8}H(NO_{2})_{7}.

As with octanitrocubane, not enough heptanitrocubane has been synthesized to perform detailed tests on its stability and energy. It is hypothesized to have slightly better performance than explosives such as HMX, the current high-energy standard explosive, based on chemical energy analysis. While in theory not as energetic as octanitrocubane's theoretical maximum density, the heptanitrocubane that has been synthesized so far is a more effective explosive than any octanitrocubane that has been produced, due to more efficient crystal packing and hence higher density (2,028).

Heptanitrocubane was first synthesized by the same team who synthesized octanitrocubane, Philip Eaton and Mao-Xi Zhang at the University of Chicago, in 1999.
