= Pentanitroaniline =

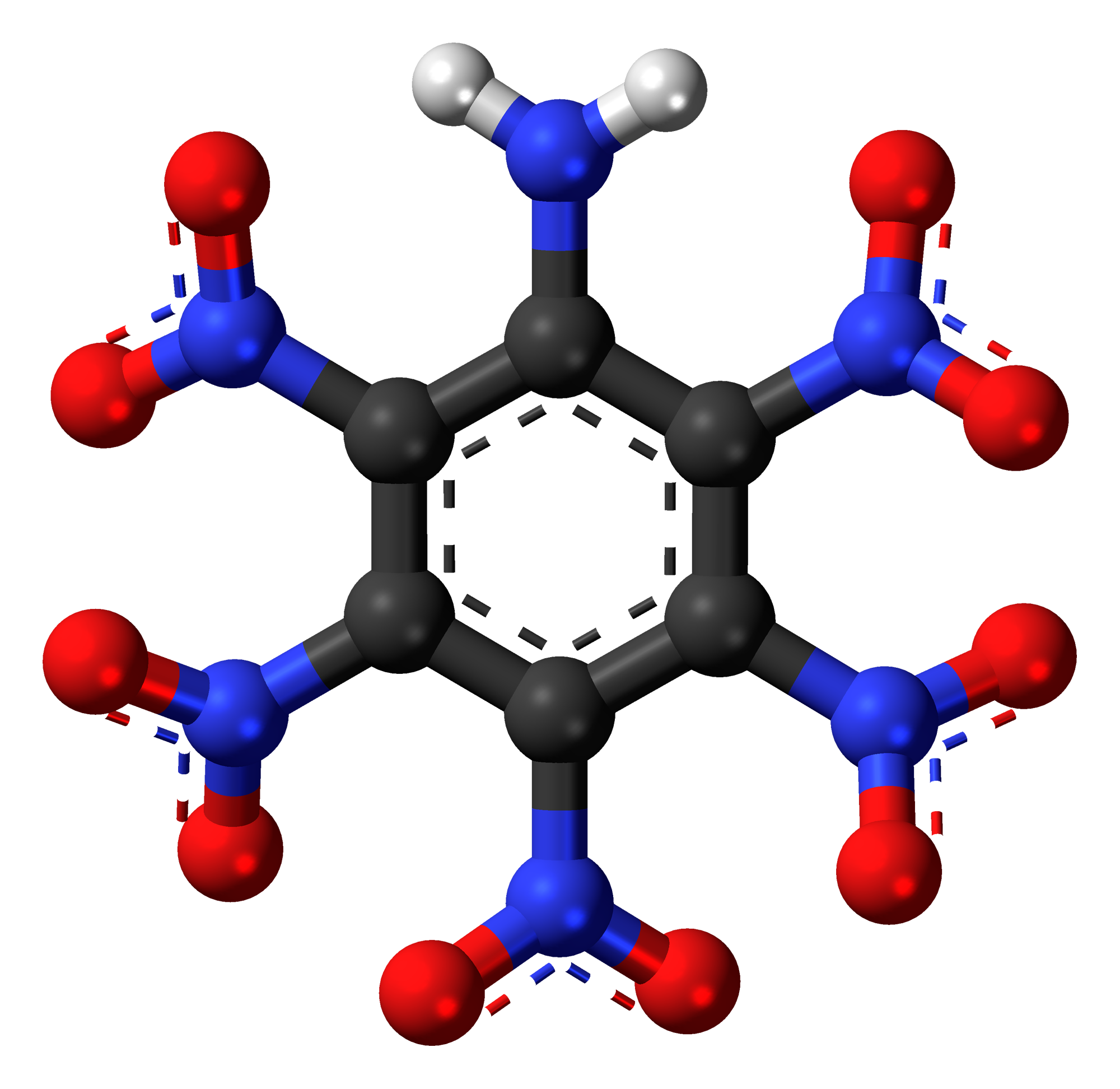

Names
- Preferred IUPAC name 2,3,4,5,6-Pentanitroaniline
- Other names 2,3,4,5,6-Pentanitrobenzenamine

Identifiers
CAS Number	21985-87-5
3D model (JSmol)	Interactive image
ChemSpider	9198736
PubChem CID	11023554
UNII	BW38Y827XU
CompTox Dashboard (EPA)	DTXSID10894078
- InChI: InChI=1S/C6H2N6O10/c7-1-2(8(13)14)4(10(17)18)6(12(21)22)5(11(19)20)3(1)9(15)16/h7H2 Key: XJYDCCKHUXCATF-UHFFFAOYSA-N; InChI=1/C6H2N6O10/c7-1-2(8(13)14)4(10(17)18)6(12(21)22)5(11(19)20)3(1)9(15)16/h7H2 Key: XJYDCCKHUXCATF-UHFFFAOYAC
- SMILES: C1(=C(C(=C(C(=C1[N+](=O)[O-])[N+](=O)[O-])[N+](=O)[O-])[N+](=O)[O-])[N+](=O)[O-])N

Properties
Chemical formula	C_{6}H_{2}N_{6}O_{10}
Molar mass	318.114 g·mol^{−1}
- Except where otherwise noted, data are given for materials in their standard state (at 25 °C [77 °F], 100 kPa). verify (what is ?) Infobox references

Pentanitroaniline, sometimes called hexyl, is an explosive organic compound. It is a relatively sensitive explosive (much more so than TNT) that can be used as a base charge for detonators, although it is uncommon in this application.

Pentanitroaniline can be reacted with ammonia in benzene, dichloromethane or another similar solvent to produce triaminotrinitrobenzene (TATB), an insensitive high explosive, used in nuclear bombs and other critical applications.

Pentanitroaniline is regulated by the United States Department of Transportation (DoT) as a "forbidden explosive" that is too dangerous to transport over public thoroughfares or by air.
