= Octanitrocubane =

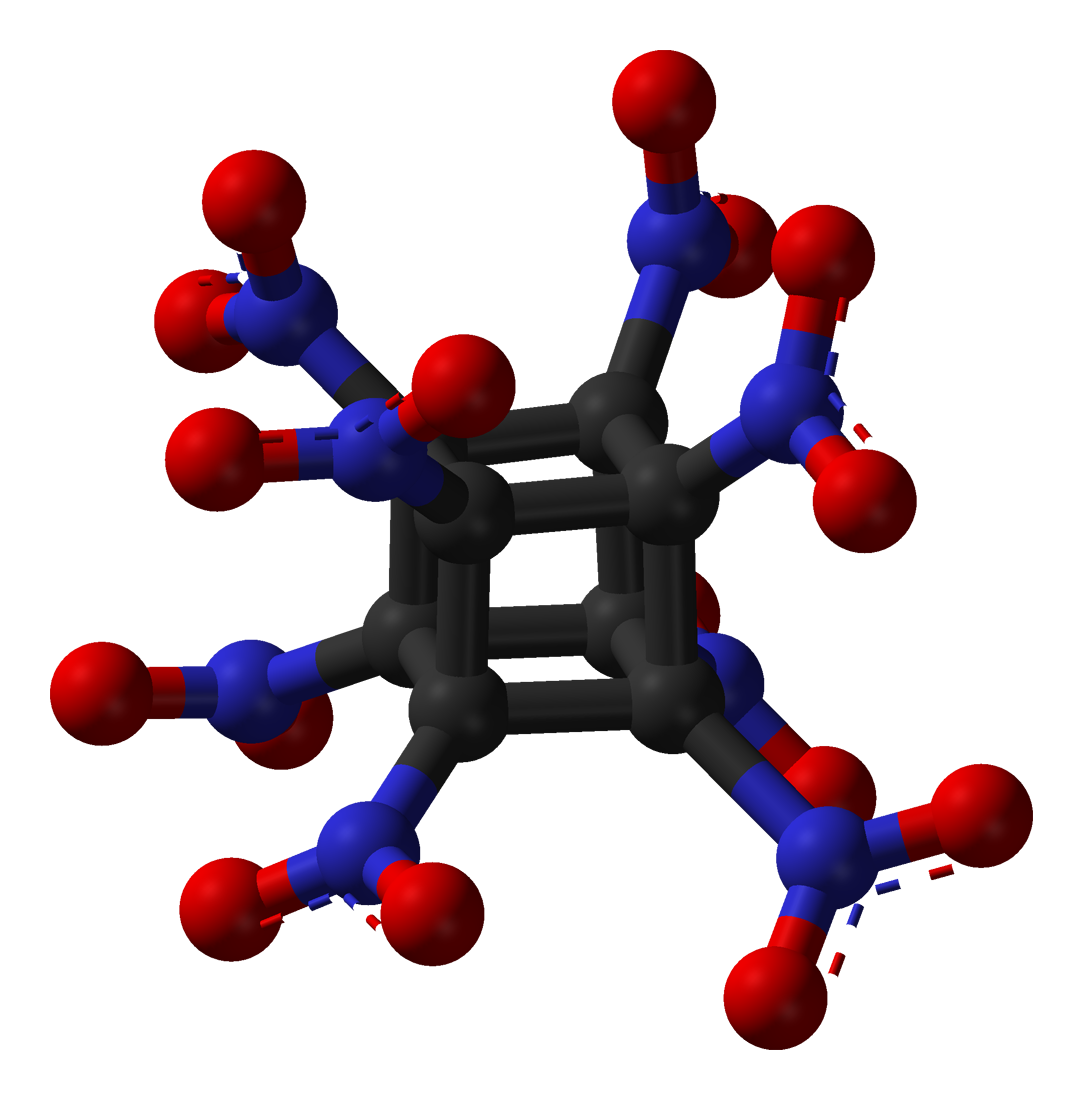

Names
- Preferred IUPAC name Octanitrocubane

Identifiers
CAS Number	99393-63-2
3D model (JSmol)	Interactive image
ChemSpider	9937054
PubChem CID	11762357
CompTox Dashboard (EPA)	DTXSID60471974
- InChI: InChI=1S/C8N8O16/c17-9(18)1-2(10(19)20)5(13(25)26)3(1,11(21)22)7(15(29)30)4(1,12(23)24)6(2,14(27)28)8(5,7)16(31)32 Key: URIPDZQYLPQBMG-UHFFFAOYSA-N; InChI=1/C8N8O16/c17-9(18)1-2(10(19)20)5(13(25)26)3(1,11(21)22)7(15(29)30)4(1,12(23)24)6(2,14(27)28)8(5,7)16(31)32 Key: URIPDZQYLPQBMG-UHFFFAOYAW
- SMILES: [O-][N+](=O)C12C3([N+]([O-])=O)C4([N+]([O-])=O)C1([N+]([O-])=O)C5([N+]([O-])=O)C2([N+]([O-])=O)C3([N+]([O-])=O)C45[N+]([O-])=O

Properties
Chemical formula	C_{8}N_{8}O_{16}
Molar mass	464.128 g·mol^{−1}
Appearance	White solid
Density	1.979 g/cm^{3}
Melting point	200 °C (392 °F; 473 K) (sublimes)
Solubility	Slightly soluble in hexane, soluble in ethanol

Hazards
- Occupational safety and health (OHS/OSH)
Main hazards	Explosive compound

Explosive data
Shock sensitivity	Low
Friction sensitivity	Low
Detonation velocity	10,100 m/s

Related compounds
Related compounds	Cubane; Heptanitrocubane; Octafluorocubane
- Except where otherwise noted, data are given for materials in their standard state (at 25 °C [77 °F], 100 kPa). verify (what is ?) Infobox references

Octanitrocubane (molecular formula: C_{8}(NO_{2})_{8}) is a proposed high explosive that, like TNT, is shock-insensitive (not readily detonated by shock). The octanitrocubane molecule has the same chemical structure as cubane (C_{8}H_{8}) except that each of the eight hydrogen atoms is replaced by a nitro group (NO_{2}). As of 1998, octanitrocubane had not been produced in quantities large enough to test its performance as an explosive.

It is, however, not as powerful an explosive as once thought, as the high-density theoretical crystal structure has not been achieved. For this reason, heptanitrocubane, the slightly less nitrated form, is believed to have marginally better performance, despite having a worse oxygen balance.

Octanitrocubane is thought to have 20–25% greater performance than HMX (octogen). This increase in power is due to its highly expansive breakdown into CO_{2} and N_{2}, as well as to the presence of strained chemical bonds in the molecule which have stored potential energy. In addition, it produces no water vapor upon combustion, making it less visible, and both the chemical itself and its decomposition products (nitrogen and carbon dioxide) are considered to be non-toxic.

Octanitrocubane was first synthesized by Philip Eaton (who was also the first to synthesize cubane in 1964) and Mao-Xi Zhang at the University of Chicago in 1999, with the structure proven by crystallographer Richard Gilardi of the United States Naval Research Laboratory.

== Synthesis ==
In Eaton's and Zhang's original synthesis of octanitrocubane, the carboxyl moieties of cubane-1,3,5,7-tetracarboxylic acid were first converted into carbonyl azides using trimethylsilyl azide. The product was heated and underwent a quadruple Curtius rearrangement to yield a tetraisocyanate, which then underwent hydrolysis to form a tetramine. Dimethyldioxirane was then reacted with the tetramine to produce tetranitrocubane (TNC). To further nitrate the compound, it was reacted with at least 4 equivalents of sodium bis(trimethylsilyl)amide in a 1:1 mixture of tetrahydrofuran and 2-methyltetrahydrofuran at −78 °C, then cooled to between −125 °C and −130 °C before being reacted with excess dinitrogen tetroxide. The process resulted in near-total conversion of tetranitrocubane into heptanitrocubane (HpNC). Dinitrogen tetroxide could not facilitate the final nitration step, the lithium salt of heptanitrocubane was reacted with excess nitrosyl chloride and ozonated to yield octanitrocubane (ONC).

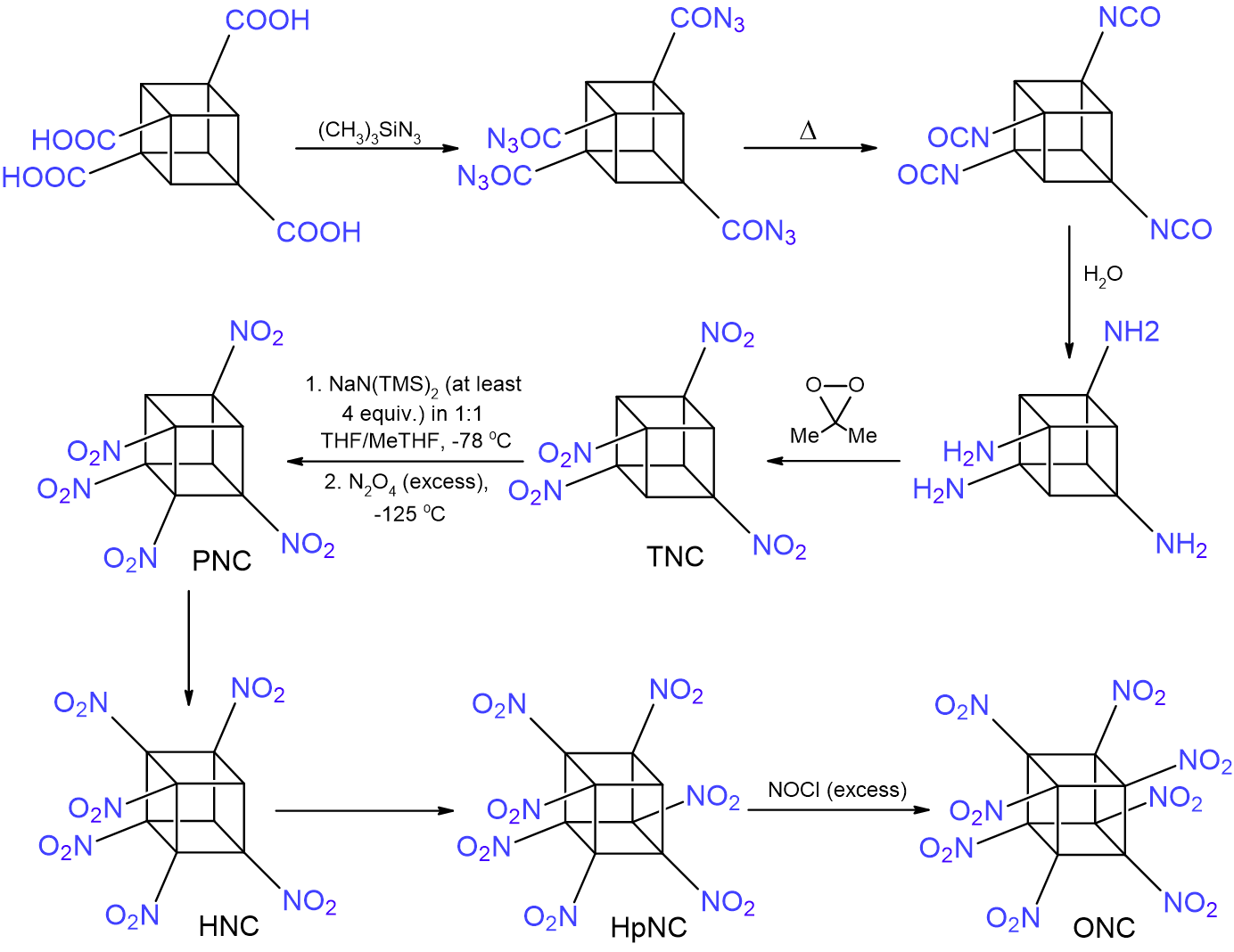

Although octanitrocubane is predicted to be one of the most effective explosives, the difficulty of its synthesis inhibits practical use. Philip Eaton's synthesis was difficult and lengthy, and required cubane (rare to begin with) as a starting point. As a result, octanitrocubane is more valuable, gram for gram, than gold.

A proposed path to synthesis is the cyclotetramerization of the as yet undiscovered and presumably highly unstable dinitroacetylene.

== See also ==
- Octaazacubane (N8)
- 4,4'-Dinitro-3,3'-diazenofuroxan (DDF)
- Hexanitrobenzene (HNB)
- Hexanitrohexaazaisowurtzitane (HNIW)
- HHTDD (Hexanitrohexaazatricyclododecanedione)
- Relative effectiveness factor
- TKX-50
