= 4,4'-Dinitro-3,3'-diazenofuroxan =

Names
- Preferred IUPAC name 4,4′-Diazenediylbis(3-nitro-1,2,5-oxadiazol-2-ium-2-olate)
- Other names: DDF; 4,4’-Dinitro-3,3’-diazenofuroxan; Bis(4-nitro-5-oxido-1,2,5-oxadiazol-5-ium-3-yl)diazene

Identifiers
3D model (JSmol)	Interactive image
ChemSpider	65321374
PubChem CID	15333368
CompTox Dashboard (EPA)	DTXSID801336173
- InChI: InChI=1S/C4N8O8/c13-9(14)3-1(7-19-11(3)17)5-6-2-4(10(15)16)12(18)20-8-2 Key: OWPQEEJZQLEILY-UHFFFAOYSA-N
- SMILES: C1(=NO[N+](=C1[N+](=O)[O-])[O-])N=NC2=NO[N+](=C2[N+](=O)[O-])[O-]

Properties
Chemical formula	C_{4}N_{8}O_{8}
Molar mass	288.092 g·mol^{−1}
Density	2.02 g/cm^{3}

Hazards
- Occupational safety and health (OHS/OSH)
Main hazards	Highly Explosive

Explosive data
Detonation velocity	10,000 m/s
- Except where otherwise noted, data are given for materials in their standard state (at 25 °C [77 °F], 100 kPa). verify (what is ?) Infobox references

4,4’-Dinitro-3,3’-diazenofuroxan (DDF) is a powerful experimental high explosive, with performance comparable to that of other high-density high-explosives such as octanitrocubane and TKX-50. It is synthesised by oxidative coupling of 4-amino-3-(azidocarbonyl)furoxan followed by Curtius rearrangement and further oxidation.

== See also ==
- 2,4,6-Tris(trinitromethyl)-1,3,5-triazine
- Octanitrocubane (ONC)
- Octaazacubane (N8)
- Hexanitrobenzene (HNB)
- Hexanitrohexaazaisowurtzitane (HNIW)
- Heptanitrocubane (HNC)
- Hexanitrohexaazatricyclododecanedione (HHTDD)
