= 2,4,6-Tris(trinitromethyl)-1,3,5-triazine =

Chemical compound

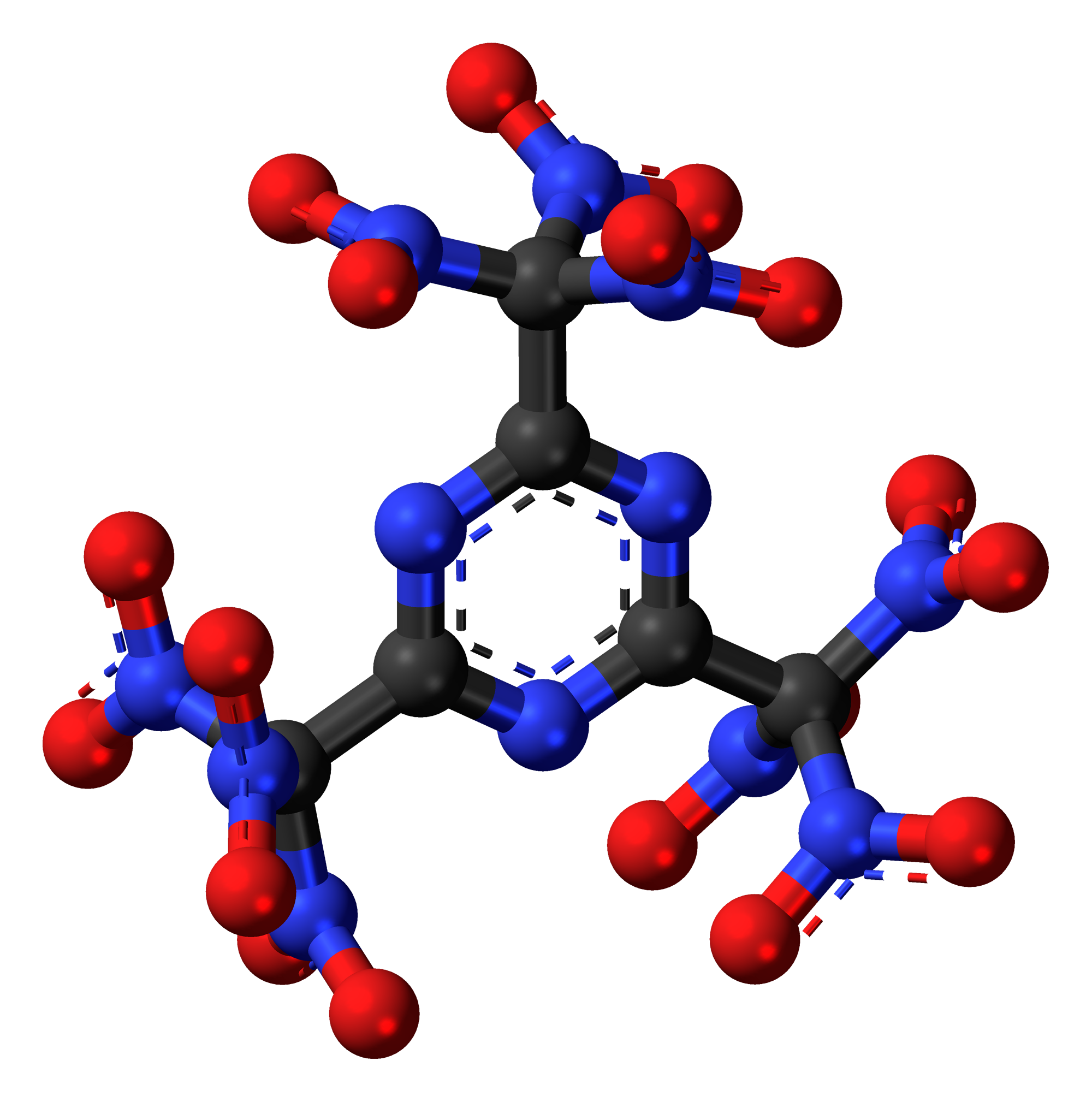

Names
- Preferred IUPAC name Tris(trinitromethyl)-1,3,5-triazine

Identifiers
CAS Number	161870-33-3
3D model (JSmol)	Interactive image
ChemSpider	9664224
PubChem CID	11489412
CompTox Dashboard (EPA)	DTXSID901027076
- InChI: InChI=1S/C6N12O18/c19-10(20)4(11(21)22,12(23)24)1-7-2(5(13(25)26,14(27)28)15(29)30)9-3(8-1)6(16(31)32,17(33)34)18(35)36 Key: MTNISTQLDNOGTM-UHFFFAOYSA-N; InChI=1/C6N12O18/c19-10(20)4(11(21)22,12(23)24)1-7-2(5(13(25)26,14(27)28)15(29)30)9-3(8-1)6(16(31)32,17(33)34)18(35)36 Key: MTNISTQLDNOGTM-UHFFFAOYAO
- SMILES: O=[N+]([O-])C(c1nc(nc(n1)C([N+]([O-])=O)([N+]([O-])=O)[N+]([O-])=O)C([N+]([O-])=O)([N+]([O-])=O)[N+]([O-])=O)([N+]([O-])=O)[N+]([O-])=O

Properties
Chemical formula	C_{6}N_{12}O_{18}
Molar mass	528.132 g·mol^{−1}
Density	1.91 g/cm^{3}
Melting point	91 to 92 °C (196 to 198 °F; 364 to 365 K)

Related compounds
Related compounds	4,4'-Dinitro-3,3'-diazenofuroxan; Cyanuric triazide Hexanitrohexaazaisowurtzitane; Octanitrocubane
- Except where otherwise noted, data are given for materials in their standard state (at 25 °C [77 °F], 100 kPa). verify (what is ?) Infobox references

2,4,6-Tris(trinitromethyl)-1,3,5-triazine is a chemical compound that is a derivative of triazine first prepared in 1995. It is synthesized by destructive nitration of 2,4,6-tricarboxyl-1,3,5-triazine. It is noteworthy for having more nitro groups than it does carbon atoms, thus potentially being useful as an oxygen source, or added to oxygen-poor explosives to increase their power.

Derivatives have been prepared by nucleophilic displacement of the nitro groups with azide and hydrazine.
