= TKX-50 =

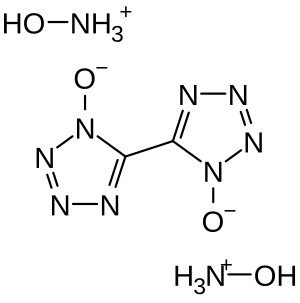

Names
- IUPAC name Dihydroxylammonium-5,5′-bistetrazolyl-1,1′-diolate
- Other names Dihydroxylammonium-5,5′-bistetrazolyl-1,1′-diolate, Dihydroxylammonium-5,5′-bistetrazolyl-1,1′-dioxide,

Identifiers
CAS Number	1403467-86-6
3D model (JSmol)	Interactive image
PubChem CID	139051543
- InChI: InChI=1S/C2N8O2.2H4NO/c11-9-1(3-5-7-9)2-4-6-8-10(2)12;2*1-2/h;2*2H,1H3/q-2;2*+1 Key: UHTGTYVZCBKFMU-UHFFFAOYSA-N
- SMILES: [NH3+]O.[NH3+]O.[O-]N1N=NN=C1C2=NN=NN2[O-]

Properties
Chemical formula	C_{2}H_{8}N_{10}O_{4}
Molar mass	236.15 g/mol
Appearance	colorless crystals
Density	1.92 g/cm^{3}

Explosive data
Shock sensitivity	20 J
Friction sensitivity	120 N
Detonation velocity	9698 m/s
- Except where otherwise noted, data are given for materials in their standard state (at 25 °C [77 °F], 100 kPa). Infobox references

TKX-50 is the chemical compound with the formula C_{2}H_{8}N_{10}O_{4}; it is a hydroxylammonium salt of 5,5′-bistetrazolyl-1,1′-diolate that forms colorless crystals, and it is a high-performing explosive with superior performance to RDX and HMX while being more resistant to mechanical stimuli. It is also considered an environmentally-friendly replacement for several conventional explosives.

It was invented by Niko Fischer, Dennis Fischer, Davin G. Piercey, Thomas M. Klapötke and Jörg Stierstorfer in Klapötke's research group at LMU Munich. Its development was funded by LMU Munich, the U.S. Army Research Laboratory (ARL), the Armament Research, Development and Engineering Center (ARDEC), the Strategic Environmental Research and Development Program (SERDP) and the Office of Naval Research (ONR).

As of 2014, the US Army was preparing it in 20 kg batches in order to evaluate it as an explosive.

== Synthesis ==
The compound is prepared by reacting 5,5′-bistetrazolyl-1,1′-diol (BTO) with hydroxylamine. The starting compound BTO can be obtained relatively easily from glyoxal, hydroxylamine, chlorine, and sodium azide.

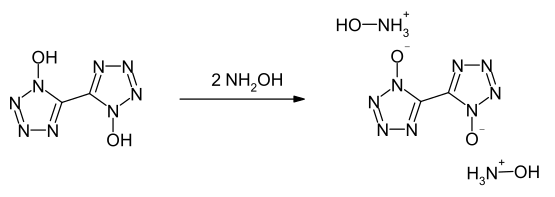
TKX-50 synthesis

Since the initial synthesis of TKX-50, multiple research groups have improved the synthesis to make it more suitable for mass production, including by adding protecting groups to make intermediates safer, and the United States Army Research Laboratory has performed multiple steps via a one-pot synthesis.

== Characteristics ==
TKX-50 is a crystalline solid with no melting point. The compound occurs in two polymorphic crystal forms. At about 180 °C, a second-order phase transition with a small heat capacity change of about 0.3 J/mol·K is observed, resulting in a transformation from the low-temperature to a high-temperature crystal form. The crystal system changes from monoclinic with the space group P2_{1}/c to triclinic with the space group P1. The compound is thermally unstable. DSC measurements show an exothermic decomposition reaction above 215 °C with a latent heat of decomposition of −2200 kJ/kg and −520 kJ/mol, respectively. The standard enthalpy of formation based on combustion calorimetry measurements is 473 kJ/mol.

=== Explosive properties ===
TKX-50 has been found to lead to melt-cast formulations with higher performance than those with HMX. Its detonation velocity, Chapman–Jouguet detonation pressure, and density are also superior to RDX.
