= Octabisvalene =

Names
- IUPAC name pentacyclo[5.1.0.0^{2,4}.0^{3,5}.0^{6,8}]octane

Identifiers
CAS Number	35434-67-4
3D model (JSmol)	Interactive image
PubChem CID	14087126
- InChI: InChI=1S/C8H8/c1-2-5(1)7-3-4(7)8(3)6(1)2/h1-8H Key: JSPVPCAAWZVNID-UHFFFAOYSA-N
- SMILES: C12C3C1C4C5C4C5C23

Properties
Chemical formula	C_{8}H_{8}
Molar mass	104.152 g·mol^{−1}
- Except where otherwise noted, data are given for materials in their standard state (at 25 °C [77 °F], 100 kPa). Infobox references

Octabisvalene is a chemical compound belonging to the group of compounds polycyclic hydrocarbons. Along with cubane and cuneane, octabisvalene is one of the three possible saturated C_{8}H_{8} hydrocarbons and a valence isomer of cyclooctatetraene.

== Representation ==
The preparation of the first compound possessing an octabisvalene structure was published in 1985 by Christoph Rücker and Horst Prinzbach. Via an initial eleven-step synthetic sequence, which was subsequently shortened to eight steps, preparatively useful quantities of (Z)-3,7-bis(phenylsulfonyl)octabisvalene are accessible:

The reaction of syn-benzene trioxide 2 with methylphenylsulfone 1 and n-butyllithium yields an intramolecular cyclization bisaddition product 3, which is reacted in the subsequent step with acetone in the presence of p-toluenesulfonic acid to afford the acetal 4. The remaining hydroxy group is converted with methanesulfonic acid chloride to the mesylate group 5, which undergoes cyclization with n-butyllithium and diisopropylamine in tetrahydrofuran to yield intermediate 6. Following the cleavage of the protecting group with hydrochloric acid in methanol to form the diol 7, the two hydroxy groups are converted into the benzenesulfonic acid ester using benzenesulfonic acid chloride in the presence of triethanolamine. Intermediate 8 is then reacted with n-butyllithium in THF to give the tetracyclic compound 9, which cyclizes with potassium hydroxide in DMSO to yield (Z)-3,7-bis(phenylsulfonyl)octabisvalene 10.

The preparation of unsubstituted octabisvalene via the reaction of (Z)-3,7-bis(phenylsulfonyl)octabisvalene with sodium in liquid ammonia was described in 1987. Alternatively, the compound can be prepared by an analogous reaction of a nitrile group octabisvalene, which in turn can be prepared via a five-step sequence from tricyclo[4.1.0.0^{0,7}]hept-4-en-3-one.

== Properties ==
The octabisvalene molecule features Schoenflies symbolism and exhibits high ring tension due to its two bicyclo[1.1.0]butane units. An MM2 force field calculation of octabisvalene yields a ring strain energy of 644 kJ/mol, a value intermediate between the ring strain of cubane (694 kJ/mol) and cuneane (571 kJ/mol). Octabisvalene is thermally inert up to a temperature of 140 °C.

According to IUPAC nomenclature, the 7- and 8-positions of octabisvalene are indistinguishable. Consequently, there are two stereoisomers for 3,7-disubstituted octabisvalene derivatives, for which the designations (Z)- and (E)-isomer have been proposed based on the cis-trans isomerism of alkenes.

In 1991, the syntheses of heterocyclic octabisvalene derivatives, namely (Z)-7-cyano-3-azaoctabisvalene and (Z)-3,7-diazaoctabisvalene, were published.
