= C8H8 =

The molecular formula C_{8}H_{8} may refer to:

- Barrelene
- Benzocyclobutene (BCB)
- Cubane
- Cuneane
- Cyclooctatetraene
- Heptafulvene
- Octabisvalene
- Polystyrene, repeating unit
- Semibullvalene
- Styrene
- Xylylene

== See also ==
- List of compounds with carbon number 8
