= C20H20 =

The molecular formula C_{20}H_{20} (molar mass: 260.37 g/mol, exact mass: 260.1565 u) may refer to:

- Dodecahedrane
- Pagodane
