= Jeffrey N. Johnston =

American chemist

Jeffrey N. Johnston is a Stevenson Professor of Chemistry at Vanderbilt University. His research focuses on asymmetric catalysis, synthetic organic chemistry, chemical biology, medicinal chemistry, and the synthesis of biologically active molecules. He is a member of the Vanderbilt Institute of Chemical Biology, where his research integrates organic synthesis with chemical biology and drug discovery. Johnston received the 2014 Arthur C. Cope Scholar Award from the American Chemical Society for contributions to organic chemistry. His research includes advancing catalytic asymmetric synthesis through the development of chiral proton catalysts and other catalytic methods that have found applications in medicinal chemistry and chemical biology.

== Early life and education ==
Johnston earned a Bachelor of Science degree in chemistry from Xavier University in 1992. He received his Ph.D. in chemistry from The Ohio State University in 1997, where he conducted research in synthetic organic chemistry under Leo A. Paquette. He worked as a National Institutes of Health Postdoctoral Fellow at Harvard University in asymmetric synthesis and catalytic reaction development.

== Career ==
Johnston joined the faculty of Indiana University in 1999 as an assistant professor of chemistry. He joined Vanderbilt University in 2006 as Professor of Chemistry. In 2011 he was appointed Stevenson Professor of Chemistry.

In addition to his research, Johnston has served as Director of Vanderbilt's Beckman Scholars Program, co-director of the National Science Foundation Research Experiences for Undergraduates (REU) Program in Chemical Biology, and Director of Graduate Recruitment in the Department of Chemistry. He has also served on the Board of Directors of the Arnold and Mabel Beckman Foundation, including as Vice Chair.

== Research ==
Johnston's research combines synthetic organic chemistry with chemical biology and medicinal chemistry. His laboratory develops catalytic methods that enable the stereoselective synthesis of complex molecules, including nitrogen-containing heterocycles, peptides, macrocycles, and natural products. His group has also collaborated on the development of antiarrhythmic compounds targeting the cardiac ryanodine receptor (RyR2), including analogues of the natural product ent-verticilide.

== Honors and awards ==
- Arthur C. Cope Scholar Award, American Chemical Society (2014)
- Fellow of the American Association for the Advancement of Science (AAAS)
- Fellow of the American Chemical Society (ACS)

== Selected publications ==
- Deng, Zihang; Padalino, Melanie A.; Jan, Julius E. L.; Park, Sangjun; Danneman, Michael W.; Johnston, Jeffrey N. (2024). "Generality-Driven Catalyst Development: A Universal Catalyst for Enantioselective Nitroalkene Reduction". Journal of the American Chemical Society. 146 (2): 1269–1275. Bibcode:2024JAChS.146.1269D. doi:10.1021/jacs.3c12436. PMC 10862354. PMID 38176098.
- *Thorpe, Madelaine P.; Smith, Abigail N.; Blackwell, Daniel J.; Hopkins, Corey R.; Knollmann, Bjorn C.; Akers, Wendell S.; Johnston, Jeffrey N. (2024). "The Backbone Constitution Drives Passive Permeability Independent of Side Chains in Depsipeptide and Peptide Macrocycles Inspired by ent-Verticilide". Chemical Science. 15 (36): 14977–14987. doi:10.1039/D4SC02758B. PMC 11348715. PMID 39211739.
- Thorpe, Madelaine P.; Blackwell, Daniel J.; Knollmann, Bjorn C.; Johnston, Jeffrey N. (2024). "Backbone-Determined Antiarrhythmic Structure–Activity Relationships for a Mirror-Image, Oligomeric Depsipeptide Natural Product". Journal of Medicinal Chemistry. 67 (14): 12205–12220. doi:10.1021/acs.jmedchem.4c00923. PMC 11284792. PMID 38958200.
