= Polyquinane =

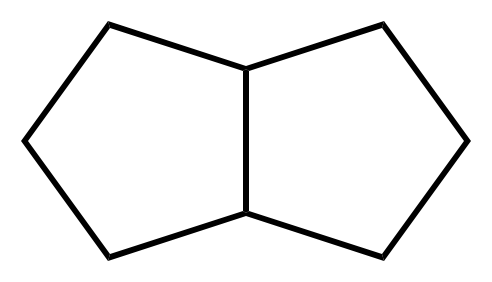
Bicyclo[3.3.0]octane

A polyquinane is any polycyclic compound consisting of fused five-membered hydrocarbon rings. If the compound is unsaturated instead of saturated, it is called a polyquinene. The simplest polyquinane is the bicyclic compound bicyclo[3.3.0]octane. Other members are triquinacene and dodecahedrane.

== Triquinacene ==
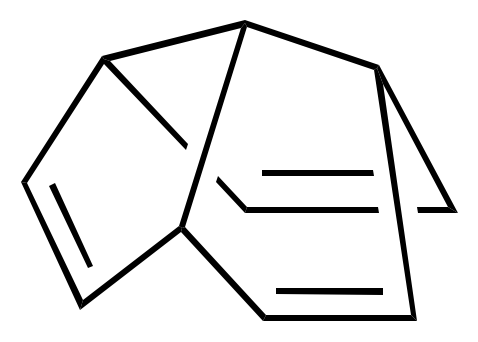
Perspective image of triquinacene, a tricyclic polyquinene, has a cup-shaped geometry, suggesting a synthetic approach to dodecahedrane and possible interactions among its alkene regions

The compound triquinacene, sometimes simply called quinacene (tricyclo[5.2.1.0^{4,10}]deca-2,5,8-triene) is the second member of a family of polyquinenes. It was synthesized in 1964 in the group of Robert Burns Woodward in connection with its suspected homoaromatic properties—though it was found to have no such properties—and also as part of a failed attempt to synthesize the then-elusive compound dodecahedrane. Triquinacene is stable, and has a melting point of 18 °C. The final step of its synthesis is a double Cope reaction to form two of the three double bonds. (Note: In the synthesis, the exo,exo- isomer was used, specifically.)

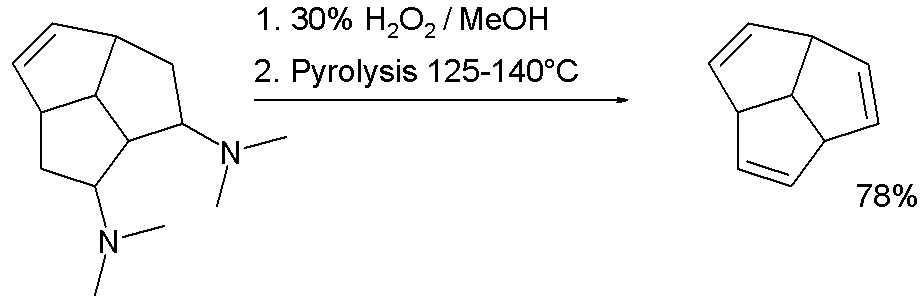

== See also ==
- Fused 6 aromatic membered rings: the acenes
- Triquinacene is isomeric with: bullvalene, diisopropenyldiacetylene
