= Polynuclear =

Polynuclear may refer to:

== Chemistry ==
- multiple rings in a polycyclic compound

== Biology ==
- Multinucleate, containing multiple nuclei
