= Norrish reaction =

Photochemical reaction

A Norrish reaction, named after Ronald George Wreyford Norrish who developed the reaction(s) during the 1930's primarily through his work at Cambridge University. It is a photochemical reaction taking place with ketones and aldehydes, further subdivided into Norrish type I reactions and Norrish type II reactions. While of limited synthetic utility, these reactions are important in the photo-oxidation of polymers such as polyolefins, polyesters, certain polycarbonates and polyketones.

== Type I ==
The Norrish type I reaction is the photochemical cleavage or homolysis of aldehydes and ketones into two free radical intermediates (α-scission). The carbonyl group accepts a photon and is excited to a photochemical singlet state. Through intersystem crossing the triplet state can be obtained. On cleavage of the α-carbon bond from either state, two radical fragments are obtained. The size and nature of these fragments depends upon the stability of the generated radicals; for instance, the cleavage of 2-butanone largely yields ethyl radicals in favor of less stable methyl radicals.

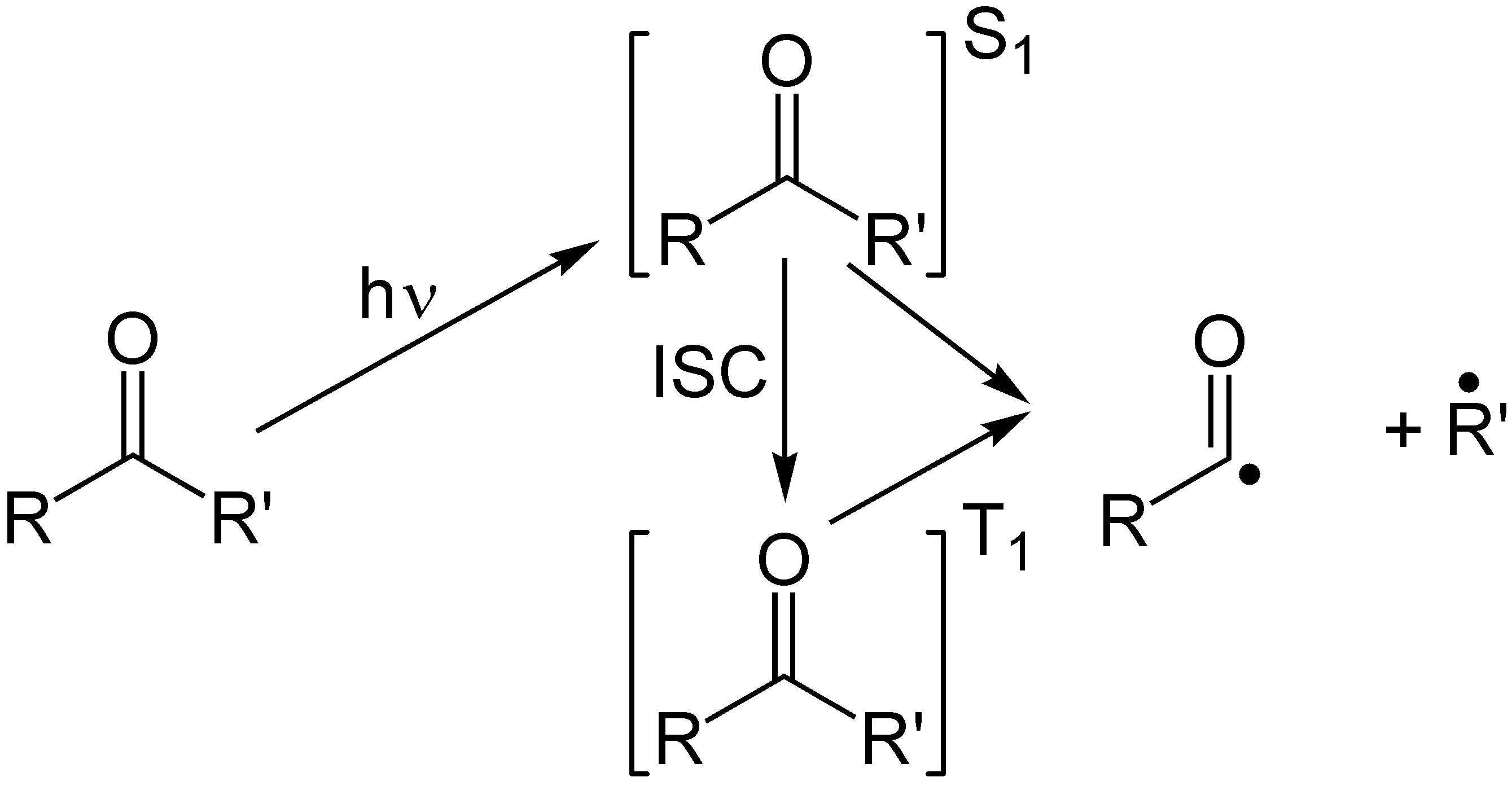
Norrish type I reaction

Several secondary reaction modes are open to these fragments depending on the exact molecular structure.

- The fragments can simply recombine to the original carbonyl compound, with racemisation at the α-carbon.
- The acyl radical can lose a molecule of carbon monoxide, forming a new carbon radical at the other α-carbon, followed by formation of a new carbon–carbon bond between the radicals. The ultimate effect is simple extraction of the carbonyl unit from the carbon chain. The rate and yield of this product depends upon the bond-dissociation energy of the ketone's α substituents. Typically the more α substituted a ketone is, the more likely the reaction will yield products in this way.
- The abstraction of an α-proton from the carbonyl fragment may form a ketene and an alkane.
- The abstraction of a β-proton from the alkyl fragment may form an aldehyde and an alkene.

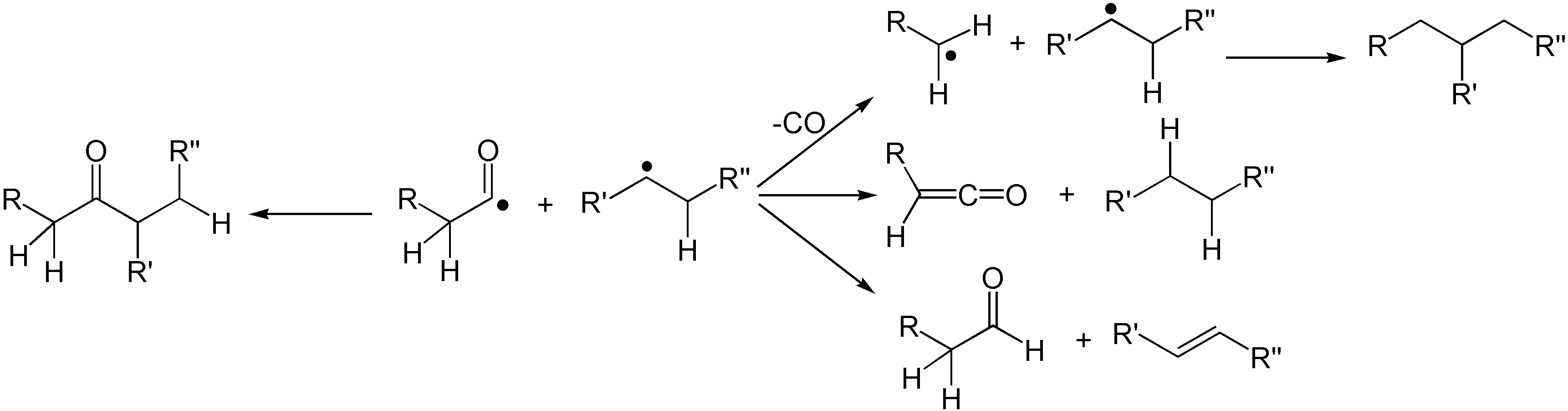
Norrish type I reaction

The synthetic utility of this reaction type is limited, for instance it often is a side reaction in the Paternò–Büchi reaction. One organic synthesis based on this reaction is that of bicyclohexylidene. The Norrish Type I reaction plays a crucial role in the field of photopolymerization, particularly in the development of photoinitiators used for two-photon polymerization (2PP). The Norrish Type I reaction is particularly significant here because it involves the cleavage of a carbon-carbon bond in a photoinitiator molecule upon excitation by UV or visible light, leading to the formation of two radical species. These radicals are highly reactive and can effectively initiate the polymerization of monomers in a localized region, allowing for the precise 3D structuring required in two-photon polymerization processes. This makes the Norrish Type I reaction a fundamental mechanism for designing photoinitiators that are capable of driving high-resolution additive manufacturing at the microscale.

== Type II ==
A Norrish type II reaction is the photochemical intramolecular abstraction of a γ-hydrogen (a hydrogen atom three carbon positions removed from the carbonyl group) by the excited carbonyl compound to produce a 1,4-biradical as a primary photoproduct. Norrish first reported the reaction in 1937.

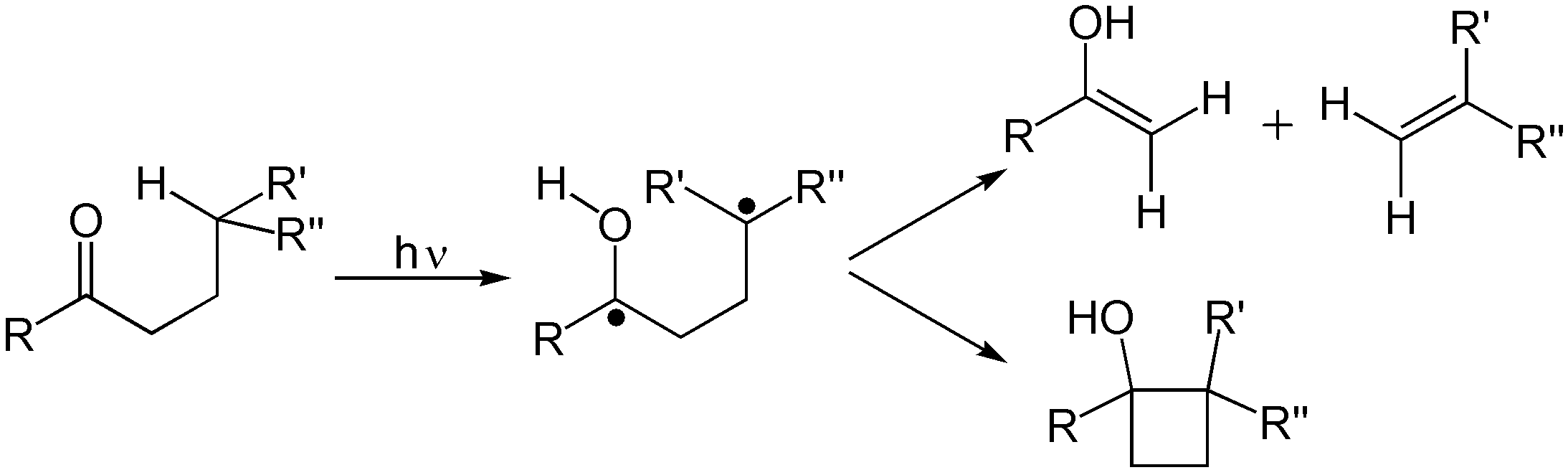
Norrish type II reaction

Secondary reactions that occur are intramolecular disproportionation back to the starting material (suppressed in hydrogen-bonding solvents), fragmentation (β-scission) to an alkene and an enol (which will rapidly tautomerise to a carbonyl), or intramolecular recombination of the two radicals to a substituted cyclobutane (the Norrish–Yang reaction).

== Scope ==
Type II reactions are typically the dominant pathway when cyclic, aliphatic ketones are irradiated; they corresponding to about 75% of the product. However, radical-stabilizing group β to the ketone can reverse that preference, causing instead type I reactions.

The Norrish reaction has been studied in relation to environmental chemistry with respect to the photolysis of the aldehyde heptanal, a prominent compound in Earth's atmosphere. Photolysis of heptanal in conditions resembling atmospheric conditions results in the formation of 1-pentene and acetaldehyde in 62% chemical yield together with cyclic alcohols (cyclobutanols and cyclopentanols) both from a Norrish type II channel and around 10% yield of hexanal from a Norrish type I channel (the initially formed n-hexyl radical attacked by oxygen).

In one study the photolysis of an acyloin derivative in water in presence of hydrogen tetrachloroaurate (HAuCl_{4}) generated nanogold particles with 10 nanometer diameter. The species believed to responsible for reducing Au^{3+} to Au^{0} is the Norrish generated ketyl radical.

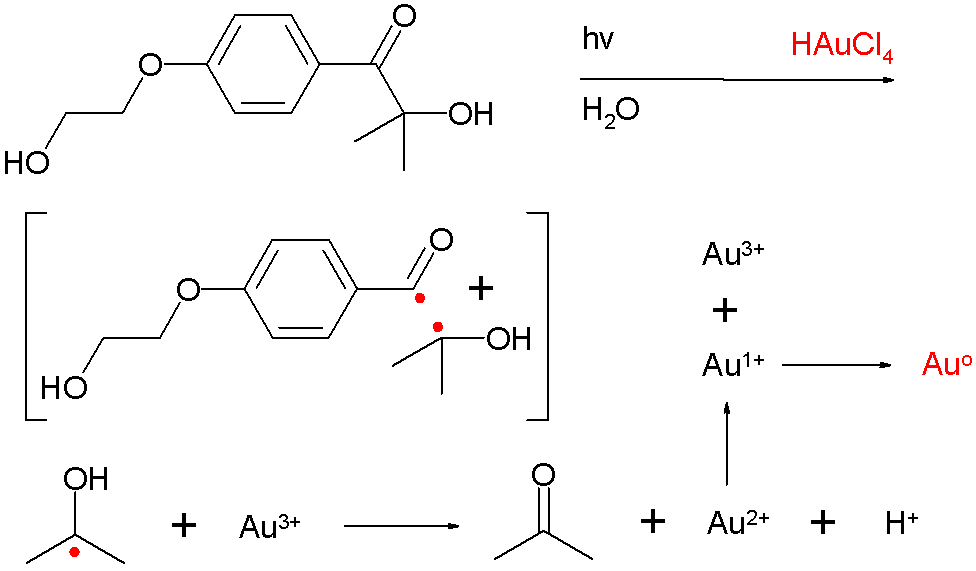
Norrish application nanogold synthesis

Leo Paquette's 1982 synthesis of dodecahedrane involves three separate Norrish-type reactions in its approximately 29-step sequence.

Norrish II reactions are difficult to engineer because there are many possible pathways to release the excitation energy; product distributions are mainly controlled by conformation. Consequently, many synthetically-useful Norrish type II reactions occur with polycyclic ketones. An example occurs early in the total synthesis of the biologically active cardenolide ouabagenin by Phil Baran and coworkers:

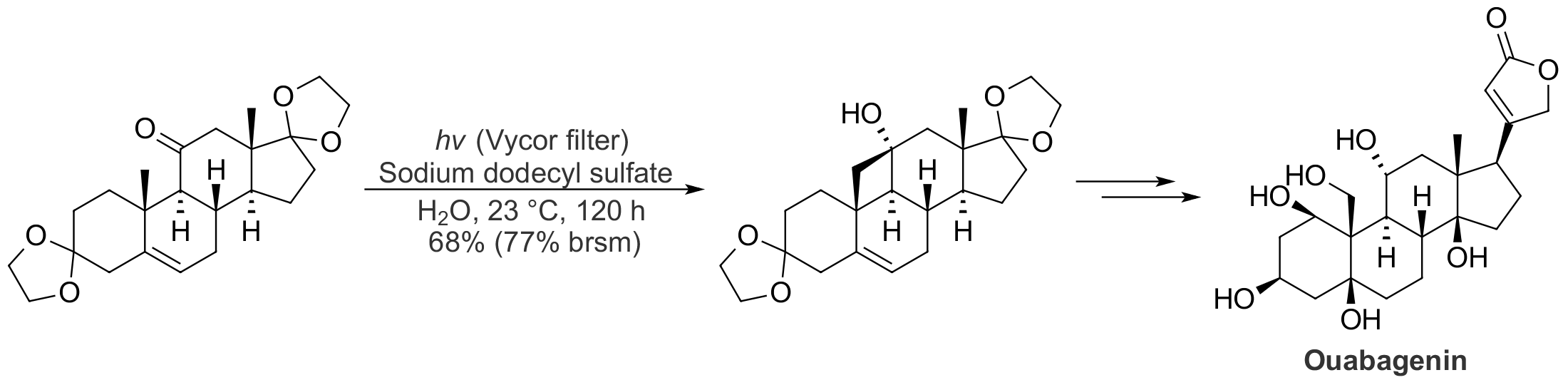
Type II Norrish reaction in Phil Baran's total synthesis of the biologically active cardenolide ouabagenin.

The optimized conditions minimize side reactions, such as the competing Norrish type I pathway, and furnish the desired intermediate in good yield on a multi-gram scale.

== Summary Chart ==
	Norrish Type 1	Norrish Type 2
Definition	Photochemical α-cleavage of a carbonyl compound	Photochemical γ-hydrogen abstraction followed by fragmentation
Initial Step	Homolytic cleavage of the α C-C bond (adjacent to C=O)	Intramolecular abstraction of a γ-hydrogen
Intermediate	Two radicals (acyl + alkyl)	1,4-biradical formed via a six membered transition state
Key Geometry	No strict cyclic geometric requirement	Needs proper alignment for six-membered cyclic transition state
Main Products	Radical fragments	Alkene + enol (enol often tautomerizes to a ketone/aldehyde)
Typical Conditions	UV light (n→π* excitation of carbonyl)	UV light (n→π* excitation of carbonyl)
Competing Pathways	Radical recombination, decarbonylation	Cyclization or cleavage of biradical
Key Identifying Feature	Bond breaks next to carbonyl	Hydrogen transfer from γ-position

== See also ==
- Photo-Fries rearrangement - a related reaction of aromatic carbonyls
- McLafferty rearrangement - similar to a Type II Norrish reaction. Caused by electron impact ionization rather than light
- Carbon monoxide-releasing molecules
