= Platonic hydrocarbon =

Organic molecule whose carbon structure is a Platonic solid

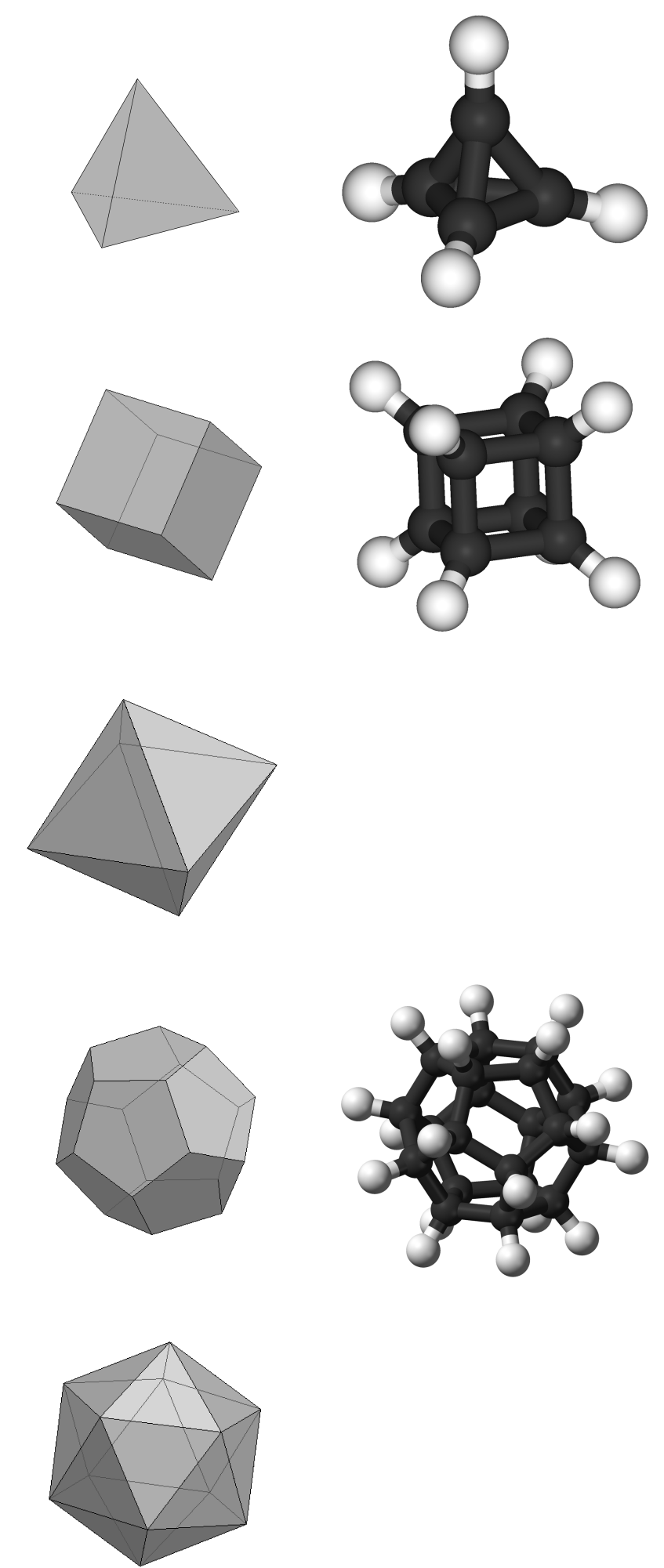
A comparison between the five platonic solids and the corresponding three platonic hydrocarbons

In organic chemistry, a Platonic hydrocarbon is a hydrocarbon whose structure matches one of the five Platonic solids, with carbon atoms replacing its vertices, carbon–carbon bonds replacing its edges, and hydrogen atoms as needed.

Not all Platonic solids have molecular hydrocarbon counterparts; those that do are the tetrahedron (tetrahedrane), the cube (cubane), and the dodecahedron (dodecahedrane). The possibility and existence of each platonic hydrocarbon is affected by the number of bonds to each carbon vertex and the angle strain between the bonds at each vertex.

== Tetrahedrane ==
Tetrahedrane (C_{4}H_{4}) is a hypothetical compound. It has not yet been synthesized without substituents, but it is predicted to be kinetically stable in spite of its angle strain. Some stable derivatives, including tetra(tert-butyl)tetrahedrane and tetra(trimethylsilyl)tetrahedrane, have been produced.

== Cubane ==
Cubane (C_{8}H_{8}) has been synthesized. Although it has high angle strain, cubane is kinetically stable, due to a lack of readily available decomposition paths.

== Octahedrane ==
Angle strain would make an octahedron highly unstable due to inverted tetrahedral geometry at each vertex. There would also be no hydrogen atoms because four edges meet at each corner; thus, the hypothetical octahedrane molecule, with a molecular formula of C_{6}, would be an allotrope of elemental carbon rather than a hydrocarbon. The existence of octahedrane cannot be ruled out completely, although calculations have shown that it is unlikely.

== Dodecahedrane ==
Dodecahedrane (C_{20}H_{20}) was first synthesized in 1982, and has minimal angle strain; the tetrahedral angle is 109.5° and the dodecahedral angle is 108°, only a slight discrepancy.

== Icosahedrane ==
The tetravalency (4-connectedness) of carbon excludes an icosahedron because 5 edges meet at each vertex. True pentavalent carbon is unlikely; methanium, nominally CH^{+}_{5}, usually exists as CH_{3}(H_{2})^{+}. The hypothetical icosahedral C^{12+}_{12} lacks hydrogen so it is not a hydrocarbon; it is also an ion.

Both icosahedral and octahedral structures have been observed in boron compounds such as the dodecaborate ion and some of the carbon-containing carboranes.

== Other polyhedra ==
Increasing the number of atoms that comprise the carbon skeleton leads to a geometry that increasingly approximates a sphere, and the space enclosed in the carbon "cage" increases. This trend continues with buckyballs or spherical fullerenes. Although not a Platonic hydrocarbon, buckminsterfullerene (C_{60}) has the shape of a truncated icosahedron, an Archimedean solid.

The concept can also be extended to regular Euclidean tilings, with the hexagonal tiling producing graphane. A square tiling (which would resemble an infinitely large fenestrane) would suffer from the same problem as octahedrane, and the triangular tiling icosahedrane. No generalisations to hyperbolic tilings seem to be known.

The regular convex 4-polytopes may also have hydrocarbon analogues; hypercubane has been proposed.
