= Metal-catalyzed σ-bond rearrangement =

The metal ion-catalyzed σ-bond rearrangement is a collection of chemical reactions that occur with highly strained organic compounds are treated with metal ions like Ag^{+}, Rh(I), or Pd(II) based reagents. [2+2] ring openings are sometimes observed:

Some metal-catalyzed rearrangements of cubane.

At least some of these rearrangements proceed via oxidative addition of C-C. Such processes are related to the activation of cyclopropanes by transition metals.

== See also ==
- Cyclobutane
- Cubane
- Cuneane
- Sigma-bond metathesis
