= Prismanes =

Class of prism-shaped hydrocarbons

The prismanes are a class of hydrocarbon compounds consisting of prism-like polyhedra of various numbers of sides on the polygonal base. Chemically, it is a series of fused cyclobutane rings (a ladderane, with all-cis/all-syn geometry) that wraps around to join its ends and form a band, with cycloalkane edges. Their chemical formula is (C_{2}H_{2})_{n}, where n is the number of cyclobutane sides (the size of the cycloalkane base), and that number also forms the basis for a system of nomenclature within this class. The first few chemicals in this class are:

Structures				
Common name	Prismane [3]Prismane; Triprismane	Cubane (preferred) [4]Prismane; Tetraprismane	[5]Prismane; Pentaprismane	[6]Prismane; Hexaprismane
Chemical formula	(C_{2}H_{2})_{3} C_{6}H_{6}	(C_{2}H_{2})_{4} C_{8}H_{8}	(C_{2}H_{2})_{5} C_{10}H_{10}	(C_{2}H_{2})_{6} C_{12}H_{12}
IUPAC nomenclature	tetracyclo[2.2.0.0^{2,6}.0^{3,5}]hexane	pentacyclo[4.2.0.0^{2,5}.0^{3,8}.0^{4,7}]octane	hexacyclo[4.4.0.0^{2,5}.0^{3,9}.0^{4,8}.0^{7,10}]decane	heptacyclo[6.4.0.0^{2,7}.0^{3,6}.0^{4,11}.0^{5,10}.0^{9,12}]dodecane
3D models (PubChem)	triprismane	cubane	pentaprismane	hexaprismane

Triprismane, tetraprismane, and pentaprismane have been synthesized and studied experimentally. As of 1994, hexaprismane and higher members have not been successfully synthesized.

The geometries of the unknown members have been studied using computer models. Initially, they do have the geometry of a regular prism, with flat n-gon bases. As n becomes increasingly large, however, the highly symmetric geometry is expected to be unfavorable, with the molecule distorting into less-symmetric forms. One series of models suggests that the transition occurs at [11]prismane. For example, the structure of [12]prismane would have the cyclobutane chain twisted, with the dodecagonal bases non-planar and non-parallel.

Hexaprismane and octaprismane are expected to be kinetically stable.

The prismanes have also been studied in terms of the aromatic or antiaromatic nature of the cage. Hexaprismane in particular would not be thermodynamically stable because it is the dimer of highly stable benzene.

== Nonconvex prismanes ==
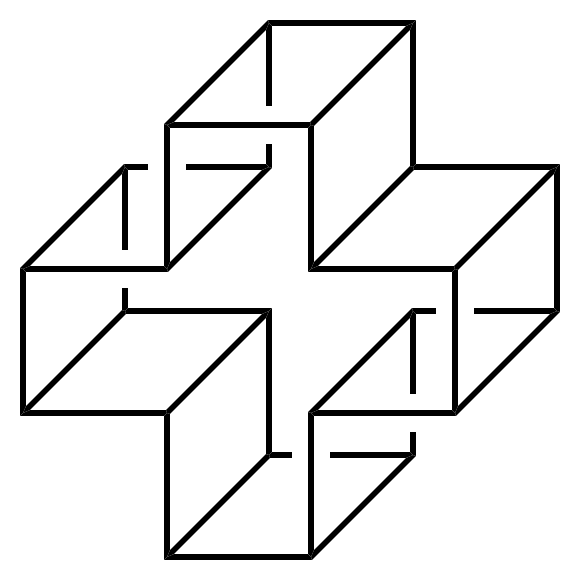
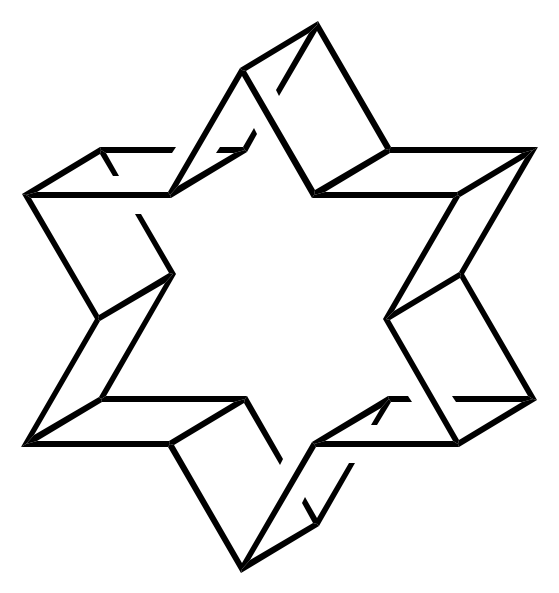
Helvetane (left) and Israelane

For large base-sizes, some of the cyclobutanes can be fused anti to each other, giving a non-convex polygon base. These are geometric isomers of the prismanes. Two isomers of [12]prismane that have been studied computationally are named helvetane and israelane, based on the star-like shapes of the rings that form their bases. This was explored computationally after originally being proposed as an April fools joke. Their names refer to the shapes found on the flags of Switzerland and Israel, respectively.

== Polyprismanes ==
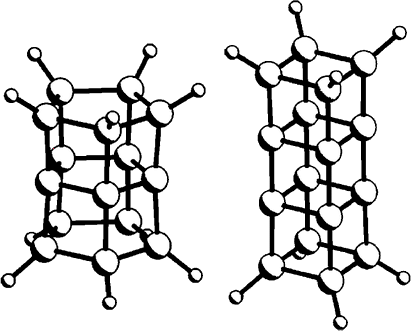
Bi[5]prismane (left) and tri[4]prismane

The polyprismanes consist of multiple prismanes stacked base-to-base. The carbons at each intermediate level—the n-gon bases where the prismanes fuse to each other—have no hydrogen atoms attached to them.

== Related structures ==
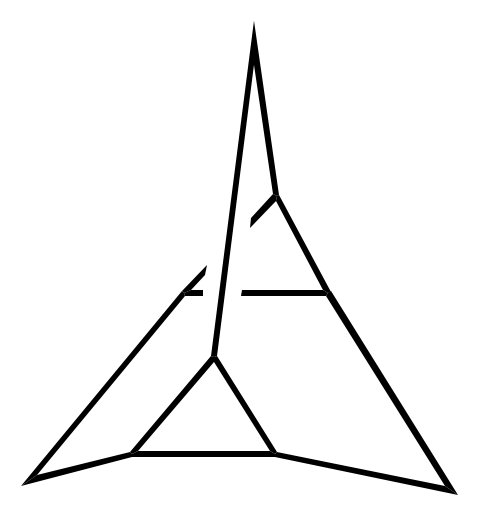
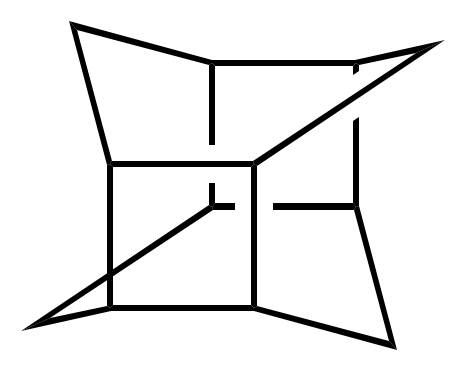
[3]Asterane (left) and [4]asterane

The asteranes contain a methylene group bridge on each edge between the two n-gon bases. Each side is thus a cyclohexane rather than a cyclobutane.

A substituted compound based on hexasilaprismane, the all-silicon analog of triprismane, has been synthesized. Theoretical analysis suggests that the prismane form of Si_{6}H_{6} is more stable than the aromatic-ring or Dewar benzene-like isomers of Si_{6}H_{6}.
