= Octafluorocubane =

Names
- IUPAC name 1,2,3,4,5,6,7,8-octafluorocubane
- Other names perfluorocubane

Identifiers
CAS Number	623570-55-8
3D model (JSmol)	Interactive image
ChemSpider	20578010
PubChem CID	16746787
CompTox Dashboard (EPA)	DTXSID901171772
- InChI: InChI=1S/C8F8/c9-1-2(10)5(13)3(1,11)7(15)4(1,12)6(2,14)8(5,7)16 Key: DLEOOIAXKVODBG-UHFFFAOYSA-N
- SMILES: C12(C3(C4(C1(C5(C2(C3(C45F)F)F)F)F)F)F)F

Properties
Chemical formula	C_{8}F_{8}
Molar mass	248.075 g·mol^{−1}
Appearance	colorless, sublimable
Density	2.429 g/cm^{3}
Melting point	160.1–171.1 °C (320.2–340.0 °F; 433.2–444.2 K)

Related compounds
Related compounds	Octanitrocubane
- Except where otherwise noted, data are given for materials in their standard state (at 25 °C [77 °F], 100 kPa). Infobox references

Octafluorocubane or perfluorocubane is an organofluorine compound with the formula C_{8}F_{8}, consisting of eight carbon atoms joined into a cube, with a fluorine bonded to each carbon corner. It is a colorless, sublimable solid at room temperature. It has been of longstanding theoretical interest, but was not synthesised until 2022, when it was prepared in several steps from the (CF_{3})_{2}CFCH(OH)C_{2}F_{5} ester of carboxycubane, beginning with its heptafluorination. According to X-ray crystallography, the C–C distances (1.570 Å) in octafluorocubane are consistent in length with those in the parent cubane (1.572 Å).

Octafluorocubane attracted interest from theorists because of its unusual electronic structure, which was verified by its susceptibility to undergo reduction at −2.1 V to a detectable (though unstable) anion C_{8}F^{−}_{8}, with the free electron trapped inside of the cube.

Octafluorocubane crystals exhibit intermolecular σ-hole interactions between fluorine atoms and neighboring cyclobutane ring centers. The molecule is predicted to be a strong tetrel bond donor.

It was voted "favorite molecule of 2022" by readers of Chemical & Engineering News.
