= Dodecahedrane =

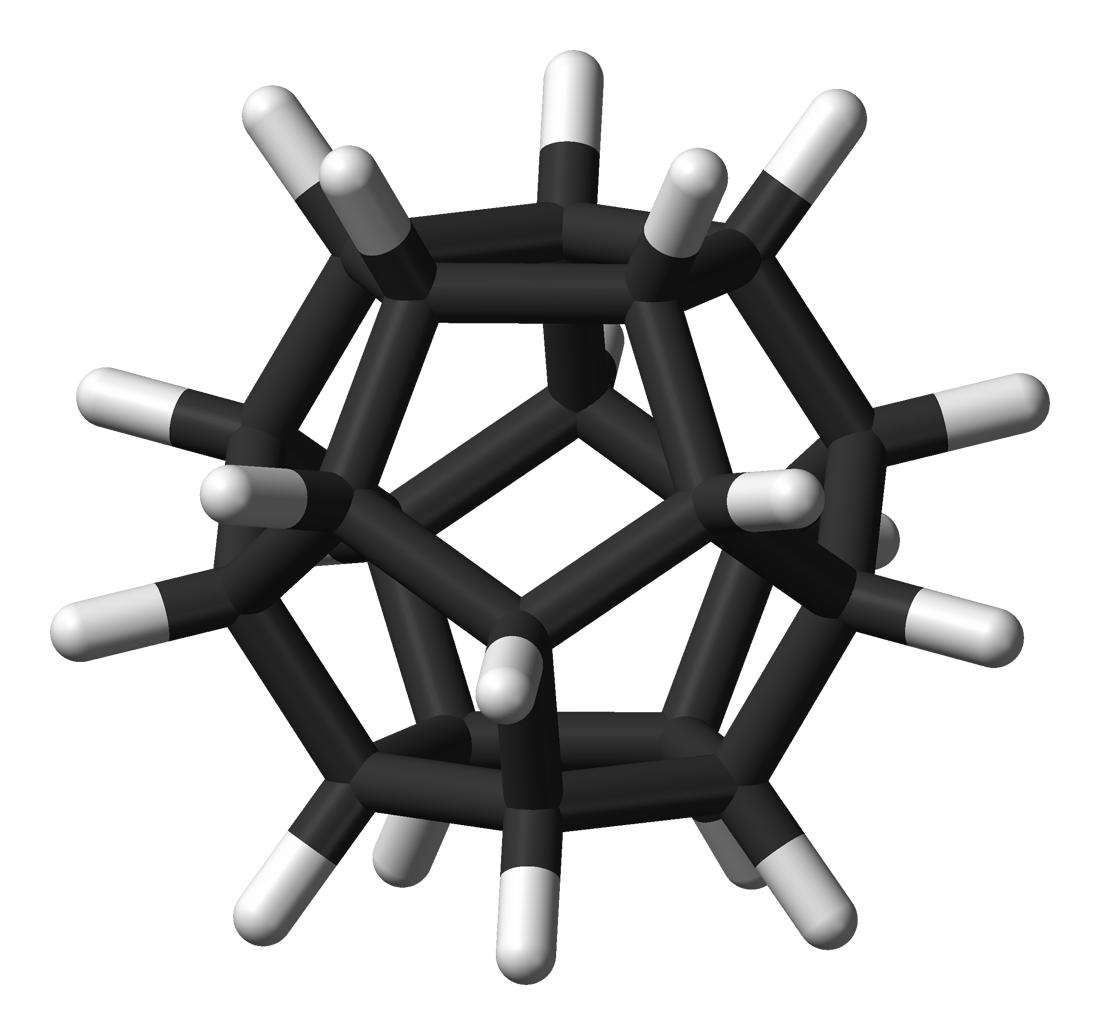

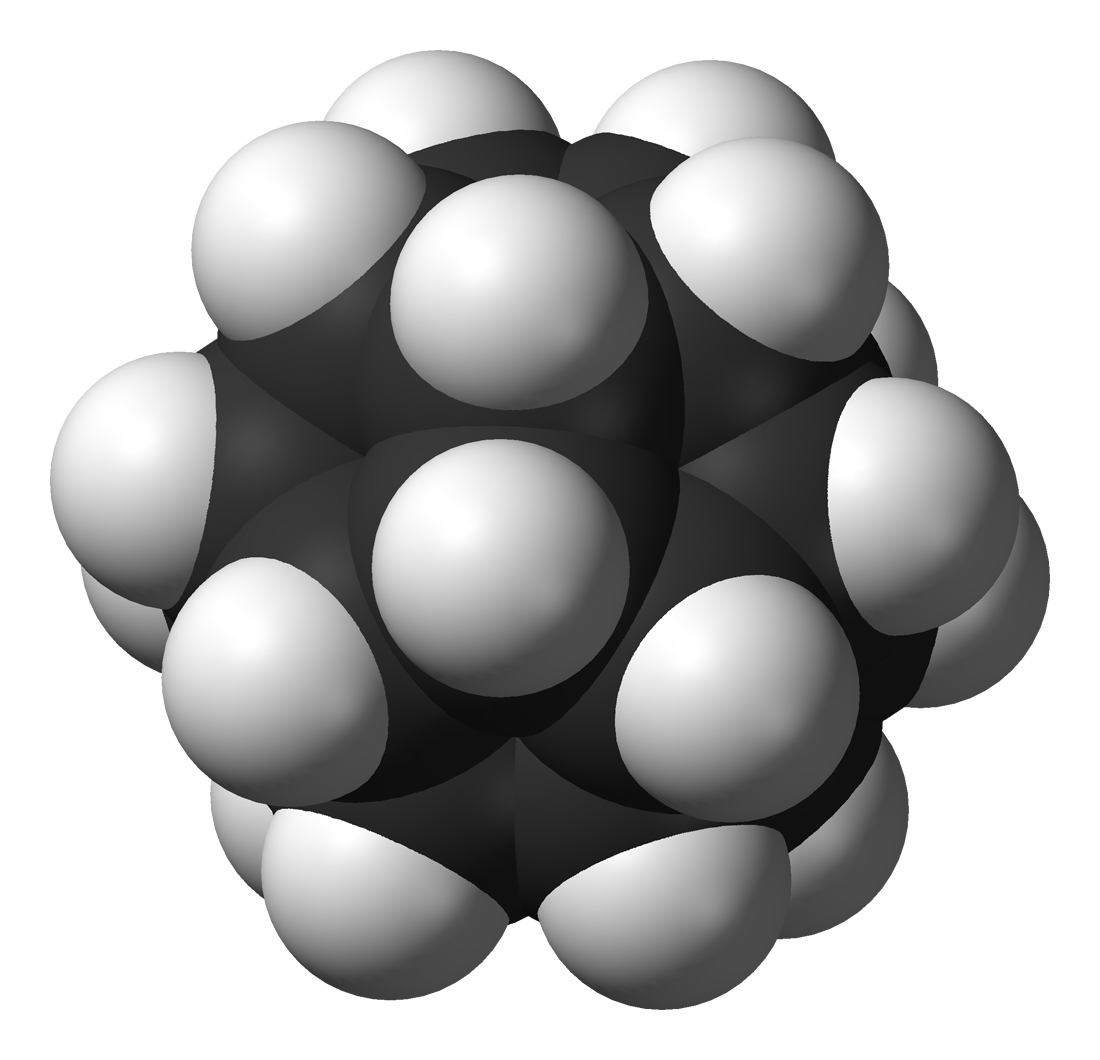

Names
- IUPAC names (C_{20}-I_{h})[5]Fullerane; Hexadecahydro-1,6,5,2,4,3-(epibutane[1,1,2,3,4,4]hexayl)dipentaleno[2,1,6-gha:2′,1′,6′-cde]pentalene
- Systematic IUPAC name Undecacyclo[9.9.0.0^{2,9}.0^{3,7}.0^{4,20}.0^{5,18}.0^{6,16}.0^{8,15}.0^{10,14}.0^{12,19}.0^{13,17}]icosane

Identifiers
CAS Number	4493-23-6
3D model (JSmol)	Interactive image; Interactive image
Beilstein Reference	1880116
ChEBI	CHEBI:33013
ChemSpider	109833
Gmelin Reference	1326921
PubChem CID	123218
UNII	FBO87C776P
CompTox Dashboard (EPA)	DTXSID90196340
- InChI: InChI=1S/C20H20/c1-2-5-7-3(1)9-10-4(1)8-6(2)12-11(5)17-13(7)15(9)19-16(10)14(8)18(12)20(17)19/h1-20H Key: OOHPORRAEMMMCX-UHFFFAOYSA-N; InChI=1/C20H20/c1-2-5-7-3(1)9-10-4(1)8-6(2)12-11(5)17-13(7)15(9)19-16(10)14(8)18(12)20(17)19/h1-20H Key: OOHPORRAEMMMCX-UHFFFAOYAM
- SMILES: C12C3C4C5C1C6C7C2C8C3C9C4C1C5C6C2C7C8C9C12; C31C%10C2C5C%11C6C8C(C1C9C4C7C(C2C34)C5C6C7C89)C%10%11

Properties
Chemical formula	C_{20}H_{20}
Molar mass	260.380 g·mol^{−1}
Melting point	430±10°C

Related compounds
Related hydrocarbons	Cubane; Tetrahedrane; Pagodane (an isomer of dodecahedrane); Prismane
- Except where otherwise noted, data are given for materials in their standard state (at 25 °C [77 °F], 100 kPa). verify (what is ?) Infobox references

Dodecahedrane is a chemical compound, a hydrocarbon with formula C_{20}H_{20}, whose carbon atoms are arranged as the vertices (corners) of a regular dodecahedron. Each carbon is bound to three neighbouring carbon atoms and to a hydrogen atom. This compound is one of the three possible Platonic hydrocarbons, the other two being cubane and tetrahedrane.

Dodecahedrane does not occur in nature and has no significant uses. It was synthesized by Leo Paquette in 1982, primarily for the "aesthetically pleasing symmetry of the dodecahedral framework".

For many years, dodecahedrane was the simplest real carbon-based molecule with full icosahedral symmetry. Buckminsterfullerene (C_{60}), discovered in 1985, also has the same symmetry, but has three times as many carbons and 50% more atoms overall. The synthesis of the C_{20} fullerene C_{20} in 2000, from brominated dodecahedrane, may have demoted C_{20}H_{20} to second place.

== Structure ==
The angle between the C-C bonds in each carbon atom is 108°, which is the angle between adjacent sides of a regular pentagon. That value is quite close to the 109.5° central angle of a regular tetrahedron—the ideal angle between the bonds on an atom that has sp^{3} hybridisation. As a result, there is minimal angle strain. However, the molecule has significant levels of torsional strain as a result of the eclipsed conformation along each edge of the structure.

The molecule has perfect icosahedral (I_{h}) symmetry, as evidenced by its proton NMR spectrum in which all hydrogen atoms appear at a single chemical shift of 3.38 ppm. Unlike buckminsterfullerene, dodecahedrane has no delocalized electrons and hence has no aromaticity.

== History ==
For over 30 years, several research groups actively pursued the total synthesis of dodecahedrane. A review article published in 1978 described the different strategies that existed up to then. The first attempt was initiated in 1964 by R.B. Woodward with the synthesis of the compound triquinacene which was thought to be able to simply dimerize to dodecahedrane. Other groups were also in the race, for example that of Philip Eaton and Paul von Ragué Schleyer.

Leo Paquette's group at Ohio State University was the first to succeed, by a complex 29-step route that mostly builds the dodecahedral skeleton one ring at a time, and finally closes the last hole.

In 1987, more versatile alternative synthesis route was found by the Horst Prinzbach's group. Their approach was based on the isomerization pagodane, obtained from isodrin (isomer of aldrin) as starting material i.a. through [6+6]photocycloaddition. Schleyer had followed a similar approach in his synthesis of adamantane.

Following that idea, joint efforts of the Prinzbach team and the Schleyer group succeeded but obtained only 8% yield for the conversion at best. In the following decade the group greatly optimized that route, so that dodecahedrane could be obtained in multi-gram quantities. The new route also made it easier to obtain derivatives with selected substitutions and unsaturated carbon-carbon bonds. Two significant developments were the discovery of σ-bishomoaromaticity and the formation of C_{20} fullerene from highly brominated dodecahedrane species.

== Synthesis ==
=== Original route ===
Paquette's 1982 organic synthesis takes about 29 steps with raw materials cyclopentadiene (2 equivalents 10 carbon atoms), dimethyl acetylenedicarboxylate (4 carbon atoms) and allyltrimethylsilane (2 equivalents, 6 carbon atoms).

In the first leg of the procedure two molecules of cyclopentadiene 1 are coupled together by reaction with elemental sodium (forming the cyclopentadienyl complex) and iodine to dihydrofulvalene 2. Next up is a tandem Diels–Alder reaction with dimethyl acetylenedicarboxylate 3 with desired sequence pentadiene-acetylene-pentadiene as in symmetrical adduct 4. An equal amount of asymmetric pentadiene-pentadiene-acetylene compound (4b) is formed and discarded.

Dodecahedrane synthesis part I	Dodecahedrane synthesis part I
Dodecahedrane synthesis part I	Dodecahedrane synthesis part II

In the next step of the sequence iodine is temporarily introduced via an iodolactonization of the diacid of 4 to dilactone 5. The ester group is cleaved next by methanol to the halohydrin 6, the alcohol groups converted to ketone groups in 7 by Jones oxidation and the iodine groups reduced by a zinc-copper couple in 8.

Dodecahedrane synthesis part III	Dodecahedrane synthesis part IV
Dodecahedrane synthesis part III	Dodecahedrane synthesis part IV

The final 6 carbon atoms are inserted in a nucleophilic addition to the ketone groups of the carbanion 10 generated from allyltrimethylsilane 9 and n-butyllithium. In the next step the vinyl silane 11 reacts with peracetic acid in acetic acid in a radical substitution to the dilactone 12 followed by an intramolecular Friedel-Crafts alkylation with phosphorus pentoxide to diketone 13. This molecule contains all required 20 carbon atoms and is also symmetrical which facilitates the construction of the remaining 5 carbon-carbon bonds.

Reduction of the double bonds in 13 to 14 is accomplished with hydrogenation with palladium on carbon and that of the ketone groups to alcohol groups in 15 by sodium borohydride. Replacement of hydroxyl by chlorine in 17 via nucleophilic aliphatic substitution takes place through the dilactone 16 (tosyl chloride). The first C–C bond forming reaction is a kind of Birch alkylation (lithium, ammonia) with the immediate reaction product trapped with chloromethyl phenyl ether, the other chlorine atom in 17 is simply reduced. This temporary appendix will in a later stage prevent unwanted enolization. The newly formed ketone group then forms another C–C bond by photochemical Norrish reaction to 19 whose alcohol group is induced to eliminate with TsOH to alkene 20.

Dodecahedrane synthesis part V	Dodecahedrane synthesis part VI
Dodecahedrane synthesis part V	Dodecahedrane synthesis part VI

The double bond is reduced with hydrazine and sequential diisobutylaluminum hydride reduction and pyridinium chlorochromate oxidation of 21 forms the aldehyde 22. A second Norrish reaction then adds another C–C bond to alcohol 23 and having served its purpose the phenoxy tail is removed in several steps: a Birch reduction to diol 24, oxidation with pyridinium chlorochromate to ketoaldehyde 25 and a reverse Claisen condensation to ketone 26. A third Norrish reaction produces alcohol 27 and a second dehydration 28 and another reduction 29 at which point the synthesis is left completely without functional groups. The missing C-C bond is put in place by hydrogen pressurized dehydrogenation with palladium on carbon at 250 °C to dodecahedrane 30.

=== Pagodane route ===
In Prinzbach's optimized route from pagodane to dodecahedrane, the original low-yielding isomerization of parent pagodane to dodecahedrane is replaced by a longer but higher yielding sequence - which nevertheless still relies heavily on pagodane derivatives. In the scheme below, the divergence from the original happens after compound 16.

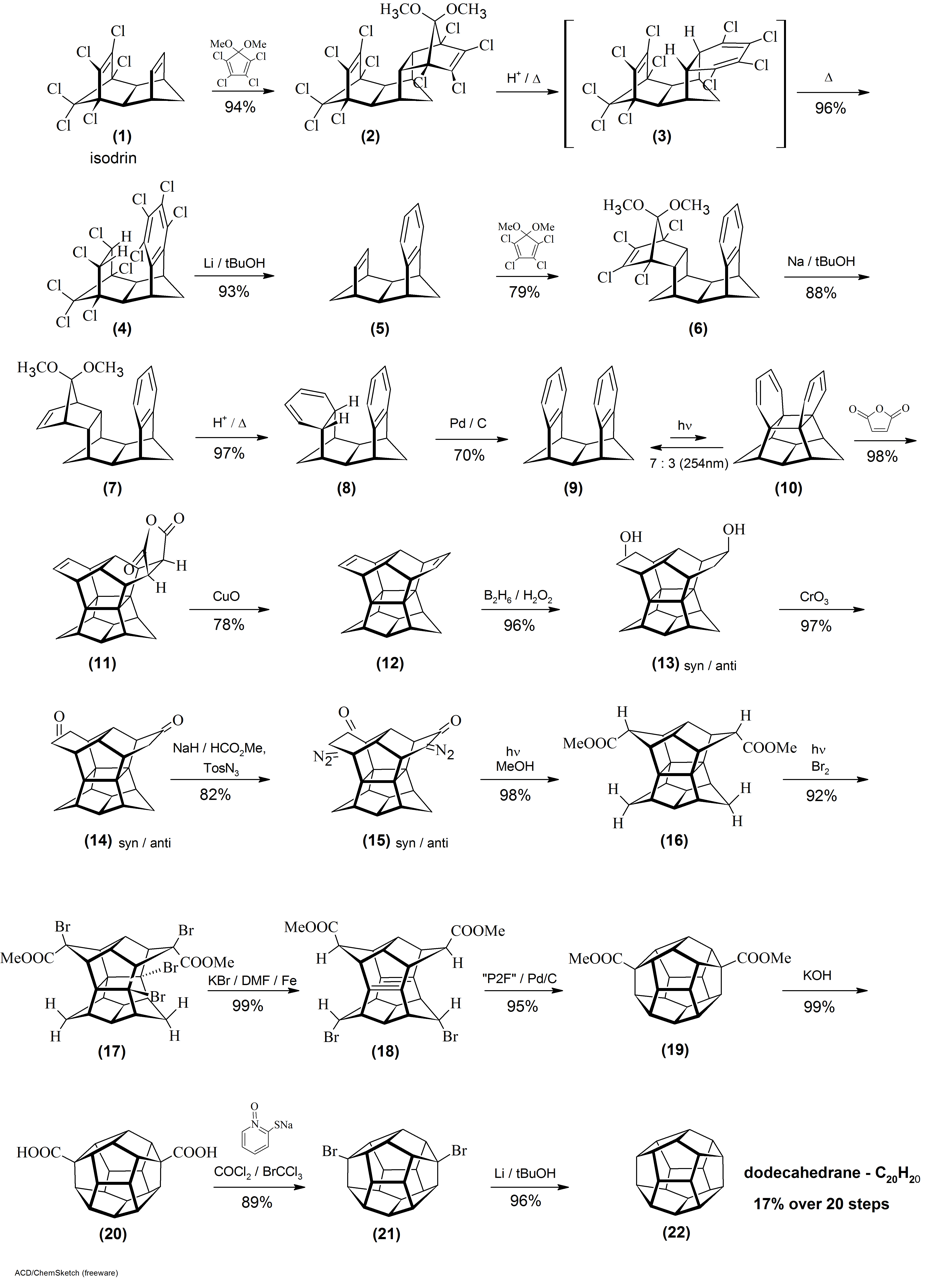
Optimized route to dodecahedrane

== Derivatives ==
A variety of dodecahedrane derivatives have been synthesized and reported in the literature.

=== Hydrogen substitution ===
Substitution of all 20 hydrogens by fluorine atoms yields the relatively unstable perfluorododecahedrane C_{20}F_{20}, which was obtained in milligram quantities. Trace amounts of the analogous perchlorododecahedrane C_{20}Cl_{20} were obtained, among other partially chlorinated derivatives, by reacting C_{20}H_{20} dissolved in liquid chlorine under pressure at about 140 °C and under intense light for five days. Complete replacement by heavier halogens seems increasingly difficult due to their larger size. Half or more of the hydrogen atoms can be substituted by hydroxyl groups to yield polyols, but the extreme compound C_{20}(OH)_{20} remained elusive as of 2006. Amino-dodecahedranes comparable to amantadine have been prepared, but were more toxic and with weaker antiviral effects.

Annulated dodecahedrane structures have been proposed.

=== Encapsulation ===
Molecules whose framework forms a closed cage, like dodecahedrane and buckminsterfullerene, can encapsulate atoms and small molecules in the hollow space within. Those insertions are not chemically bonded to the caging compound, but merely mechanically trapped in it.

Cross, Saunders and Prinzbach succeeded in encapsulating helium atoms in dodecahedrane by shooting He^{+} ions at a film of the compound. They obtained microgram quantities of He@C_{20}H_{20} (the "@" being the standard notation for encapsulation), which they described as a quite stable substance. The molecule has been described as "the world's smallest helium balloon".
