= Cubane =

Organic compound (C8H8) with a cube carbon structure

- Structural formula of cubane

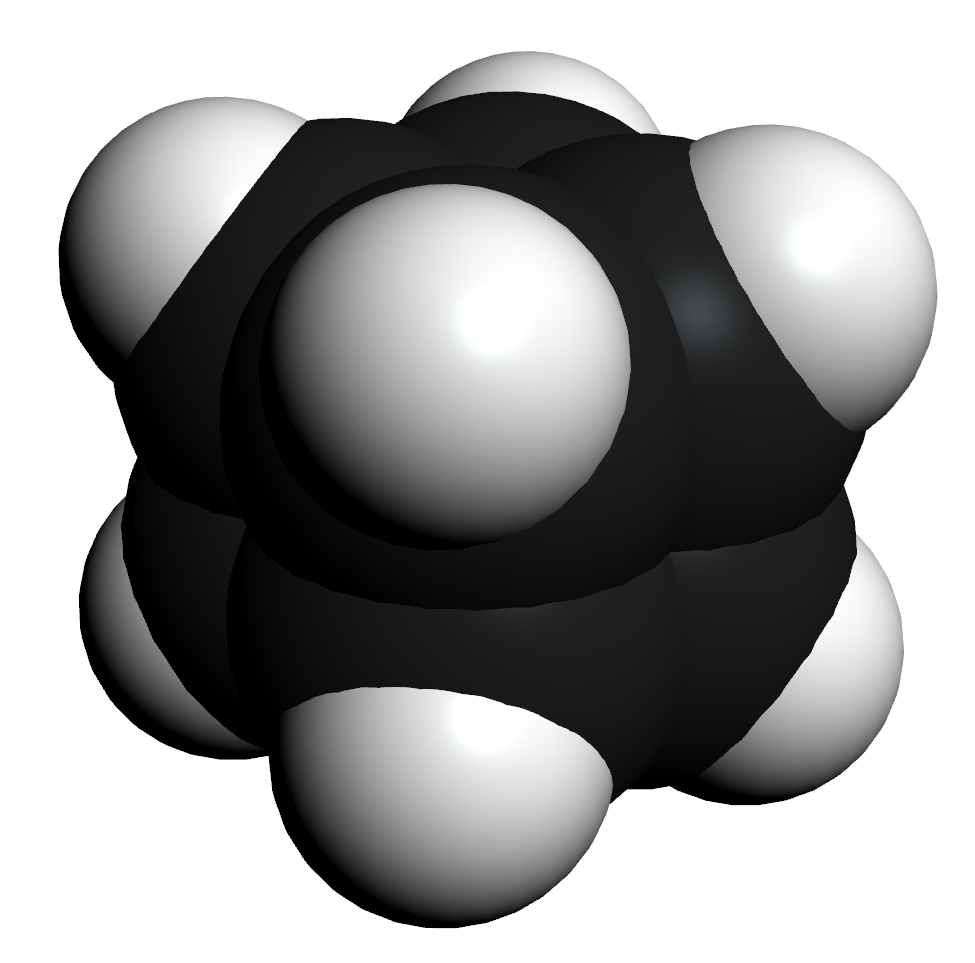
CPK model of Cubane.
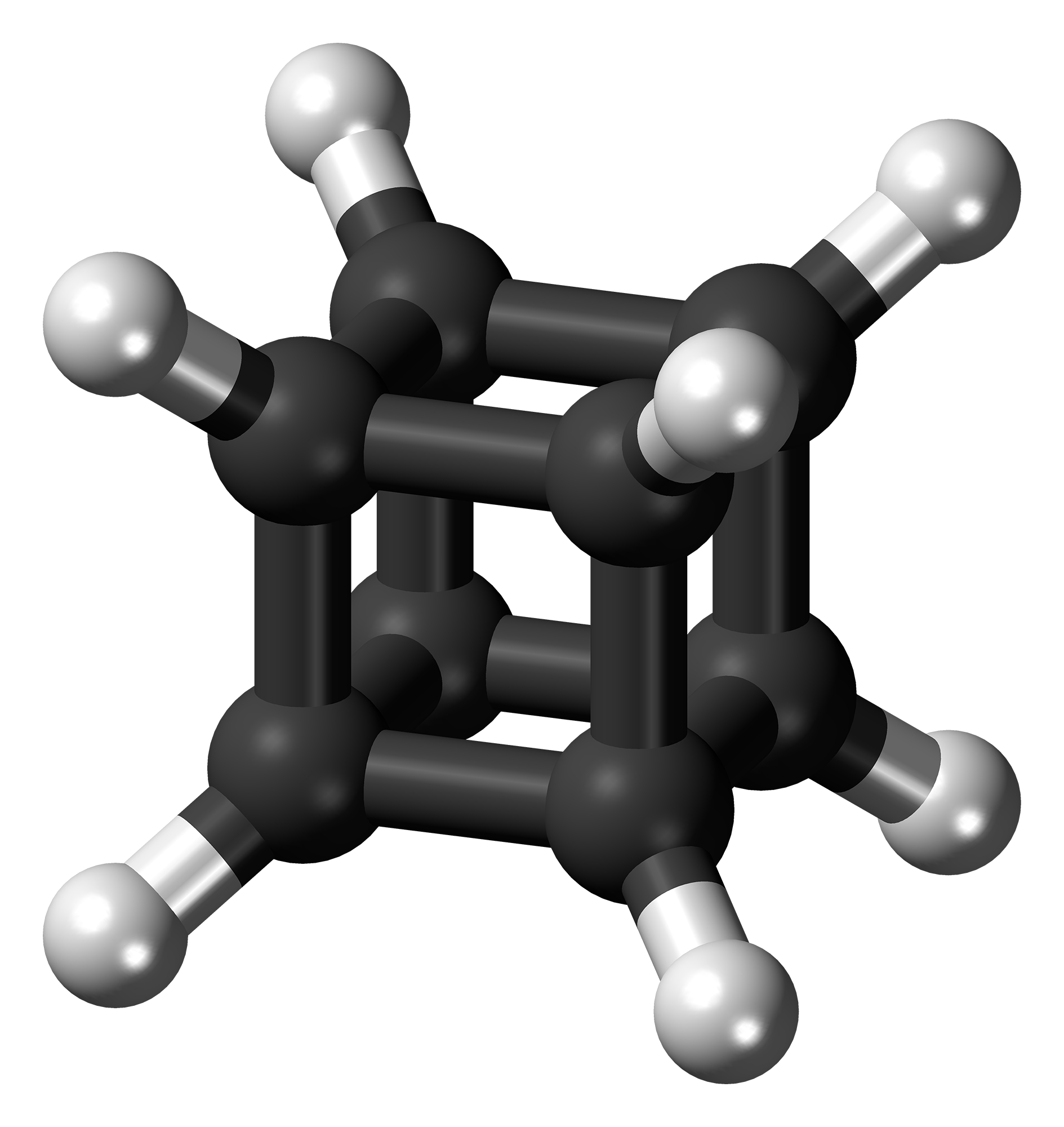
Ball-and-stick model of cubane

Names
- Preferred IUPAC name Cubane
- Systematic IUPAC name Pentacyclo[4.2.0.0^{2,5}.0^{3,8}.0^{4,7}]octane

Identifiers
CAS Number	277-10-1
3D model (JSmol)	Interactive image
ChEBI	CHEBI:33014
ChemSpider	119867
PubChem CID	136090
UNII	Z5HM0Q7DK1
CompTox Dashboard (EPA)	DTXSID50182062
- InChI: InChI=1S/C8H8/c1-2-5-3(1)7-4(1)6(2)8(5)7/h1-8H Key: TXWRERCHRDBNLG-UHFFFAOYSA-N; InChI=1/C8H8/c1-2-5-3(1)7-4(1)6(2)8(5)7/h1-8H Key: TXWRERCHRDBNLG-UHFFFAOYAL
- SMILES: C12C3C4C1C5C2C3C45

Properties
Chemical formula	C_{8}H_{8}
Molar mass	104.15 g/mol
Appearance	Transparent crystalline solid
Density	1.29 g/cm^{3}
Melting point	133.5 °C (272.3 °F; 406.6 K)
Boiling point	161.6 °C (322.9 °F; 434.8 K)

Related compounds
Related hydrocarbons	Cuneane; Dodecahedrane; Tetrahedrane; Prismane; Prismane C8
Related compounds	Octafluorocubane; Octanitrocubane; Octaazacubane; Mirex
- Except where otherwise noted, data are given for materials in their standard state (at 25 °C [77 °F], 100 kPa). verify (what is ?) Infobox references

Cubane is a synthetic hydrocarbon compound with the formula C_{8}H_{8}. It consists of eight carbon atoms arranged at the corners of a cube, with one hydrogen atom attached to each carbon atom. A solid crystalline substance, cubane is one of the Platonic hydrocarbons and a member of the prismanes. It was first synthesized in 1964 by Philip Eaton and Thomas Cole. Before this work, Eaton believed that cubane would be impossible to synthesize due to the "required 90 degree bond angles". The cubic shape requires the carbon atoms to adopt an unusually sharp 90° bonding angle, which would be highly strained as compared to the 109.45° angle of a tetrahedral carbon. Once formed, cubane is quite kinetically stable, due to a lack of readily available decomposition paths. It is the simplest hydrocarbon with octahedral symmetry.

Having high potential energy and kinetic stability makes cubane and its derivative compounds useful for controlled energy storage. For example, octanitrocubane and heptanitrocubane have been studied as high-performance explosives. These compounds also typically have a very high density for hydrocarbon molecules. The resulting high energy density means a large amount of energy can be stored in a comparably smaller amount of space, an important consideration for applications in fuel storage and energy transport. Furthermore, their geometry and stability make them suitable isosteres for benzene rings.

== Synthesis ==
The classic 1964 synthesis starts with the conversion of 2-cyclopentenone to 2-bromocyclopentadienone:

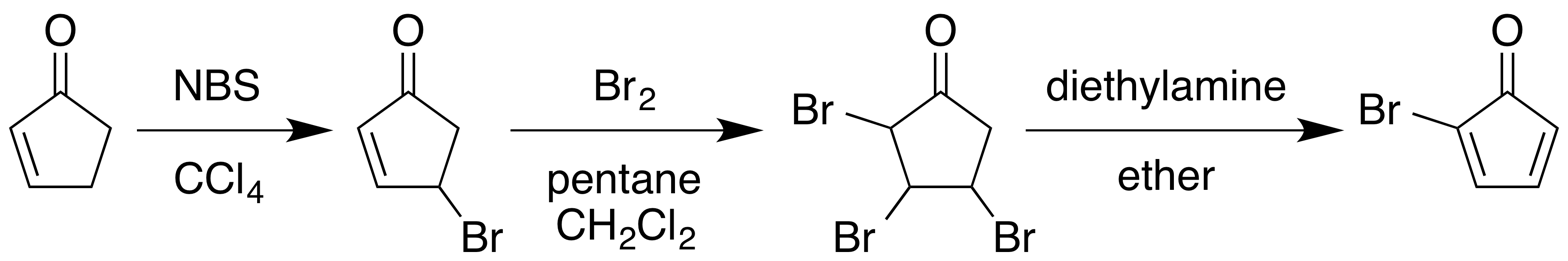

Allylic bromination with N-bromosuccinimide in carbon tetrachloride followed by addition of molecular bromine to the alkene gives a 2,3,4-tribromocyclopentanone. Treating this compound with diethylamine in diethyl ether causes elimination of two equivalents of hydrogen bromide to give the diene product.

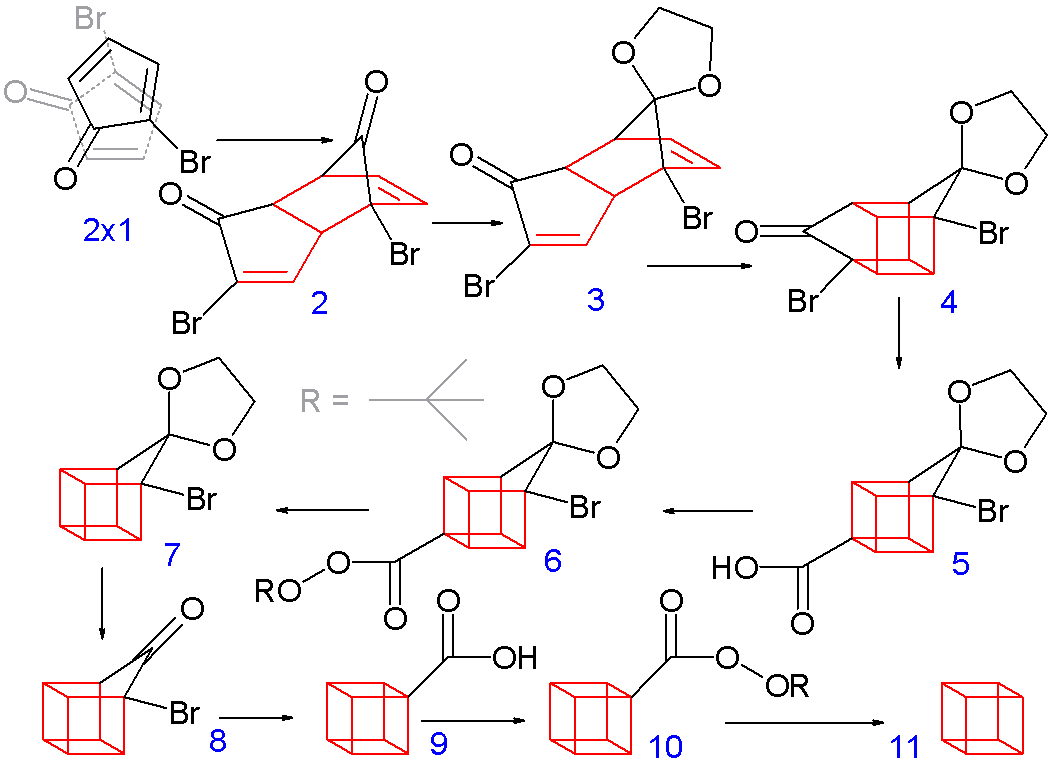
Eaton's 1964 synthesis of cubane

The construction of the eight-carbon cubane framework begins when 2-bromocyclopentadienone undergoes a spontaneous Diels-Alder dimerization. One ketal of the endo isomer is subsequently selectively deprotected with aqueous hydrochloric acid to 3.

In the next step, the endo isomer 3 (with both alkene groups in close proximity) forms the cage-like isomer 4 in a photochemical [2+2] cycloaddition. The bromoketone group is converted to ring-contracted carboxylic acid 5 in a Favorskii rearrangement with potassium hydroxide. Next, the thermal decarboxylation takes place through the acid chloride (with thionyl chloride) and the tert-butyl perester 6 (with tert-butyl hydroperoxide and pyridine) to 7; afterward, the acetal is once more removed in 8. A second Favorskii rearrangement gives 9, and finally another decarboxylation gives, via 10, cubane (11).

A more approachable laboratory synthesis of disubstituted cubane involves bromination of the ethylene ketal of cyclopentanone to give a tribromocyclopentanone derivative. Subsequent steps involve dehydrobromination, Diels-Alder dimerization, etc.

Alternative synthesis of a disubstituted cubane

The resulting cubane-1,4-dicarboxylic acid is used to synthesize other substituted cubanes. Cubane itself can be obtained nearly quantitatively by photochemical decarboxylation of the thiohydroxamate ester (the Barton decarboxylation).

== Reactions and derivatives ==
Cubane locants

Cubane is highly strained, but cannot decompose: the resultant cubene molecules would be pyramidal alkenes, too high-energy for most elimination pathways. Certain metallic ions catalyze σ-bond rearrangement to cuneane:

With a rhodium catalyst, cubane first forms syn-tricyclooctadiene, which can thermally decompose to cyclooctatetraene at 50–60 °C.

The main cubane functionalization challenge is C-H bond activation. Cubenes still inhibit decomposition during radical substitution, but the reaction offers little control against oversubstitution. In polar reactions, cubane reacts somewhat similarly to arenes or other cluster compounds: it is slightly acidic, deprotonating about 63000 times faster than cyclohexane. The metallation equilibrium is strongly disfavored with unsubstituted cubane, but the anion comprises about 3% of cubane carboxamide-TMP lithium mixtures.

Cubane substituents generally display normal reactivity. For example a Curtius rearrangement followed by organic oxidation converts cubane tetra(carbonylchloride) to tetranitrocubane. However, electron-rich substituents such as alcohols can enable decomposition; they stabilize the cubene intermediate as a ketone (or equivalent) tautomer.

Oxalyl chloride oxidizes cubane carboxamides to give a norcubane-furanone derivative.

Hypercubane was predicted to exist in a 2014 publication.

=== Persubstituted derivatives ===
Octanitrocubane is a green explosive.

Both heptafluorocubane and octafluorocubane were synthesized in 2022 to study octafluorocubane's unusual electronic structure. Single-electron reduction to the radical anion C_{8}F^{−}_{8} traps an otherwise-free electron inside the cube, making it the world's smallest box.

Octa(trifluoromethyl)cubane is made much more simply than the other persubstituted cubanes: it is the irradiation product of (inter alia) octa(trifluoromethyl)cyclooctatetraene, or can be made in two steps from hexafluorobutyne. Octa(cyclopropyl)cubane is made similarly.

=== Cubenes and oligo-cubylcubanes ===
Despite their orbital strain, two cubenes have been synthesized, and a third analyzed computationally. ortho-Cubene, produced via lithium-halogen exchange followed by elimination, was the most pyramidalized alkene ever made at the time of its first synthesis. In 2026, a new study of cubene was reported by Garg and Houk, showing that cubene has unusually low bond order and undergoes cycloadditions.

Meta-cubene (1,3-dehydrocubane) is even less stable, and para-cubene (1,4-dehydrocubane) probably only exists as a diradical rather than an actual diagonal bond. They rapidly undergo nucleophilic addition.

Decomposition of cubenes has enabled chemists to synthesize cubylcubane, as well as higher oligomers. Per X-ray diffraction, the central cubane-cubane bond is exceedingly short (1.458 Å), much shorter than the typical C-C single bond (1.578 Å). This is attributed to the fact that the exocyclic orbitals of cubane are s-rich and close to the nucleus.

The oligo-cubylcubanes are rigid molecular rods considered for liquid crystal design. Absent solubilizing groups on the cubane monomer, oligomers with at least 4 units are essentially insoluble, thus scarcely accessible through conventional organic synthesis.

=== poly-cubane ===
Diasterane

poly-cubane may be synthesized via solid-state polymerization of cubane at 250 °C and high pressure (4–30 GPa) in a diamond anvil cell, and is recoverable at ambient temperature and pressure. It is a translucent yellow crystalline solid, denser than cubane itself, that is stable up to 300 °C. Provisional structure assignment from powder X-ray diffraction suggests a model for the material that is formally derived from a 1D chain of cubane molecules by breaking two diametrically opposite C–C bonds in each cubane molecule to form a diasterane-based tetraradical, then connecting each such group to the groups directly to its left and right via pairs of C–C bonds. It exhibits an exceptionally high refractive index.

== See also ==
- Basketane
- Tetrahedrane
- Platonic hydrocarbon
- Cubane-type cluster
