= Hypercubane =

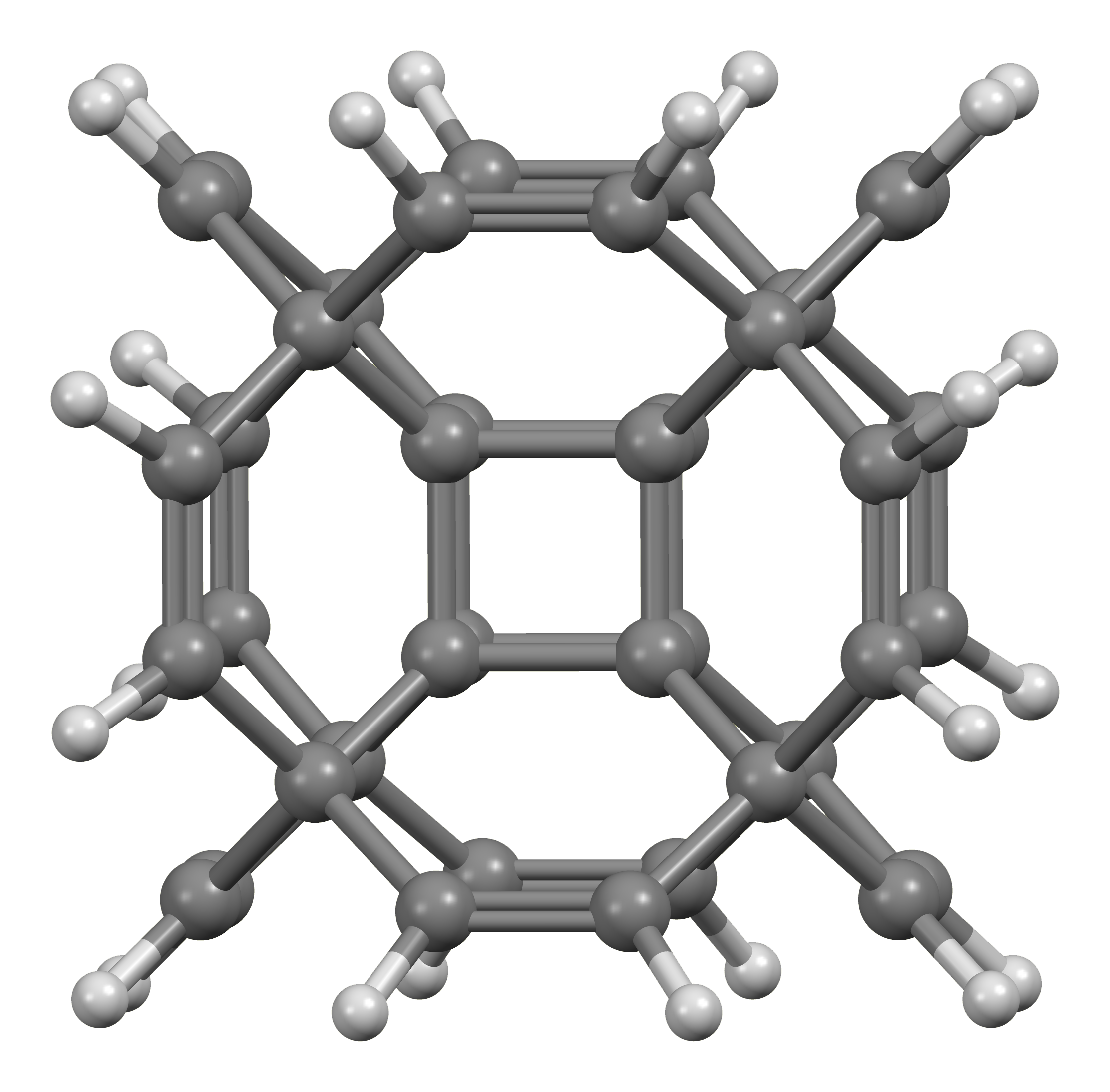

Names
- IUPAC name heptadecacyclo[5.5.5.5^{10,17}.5^{15,15}.3^{7,16}.0^{4,14}.0^{14,17}.2^{1,27}.2^{4,30}.2^{20,23}.2^{20,27}.2^{23,30}.0^{10,18}.0^{13,18}.0^{13,26}.0^{16,19}.0^{19,26}]tetraconta-2,5,8,11,21,24,28,31,33,35,37,39-dodecaene

Identifiers
CAS Number	1627580-03-3
3D model (JSmol)	Interactive image
PubChem CID	165360254
CompTox Dashboard (EPA)	DTXSID601337444
- InChI: InChI=1S/C40H24/c1-2-26-7-9-29-15-11-27-5-3-25(1)4-6-28-12-16-30(10-8-26)20-23-32(22-19-29)24-21-31(17-13-27,18-14-28)39-35(27)33(25)34(26)37(29,35)40(32,39)38(30,34)36(28,33)39/h1-24H Key: FFMFUIDOGFAUOP-UHFFFAOYSA-N
- SMILES: C/1=C/C\28/C=C\C\39\C=C/C\46/C=C\C17/C=C\C/5%15\C=C/C%13(/C=C2)\C=C/C%11(/C=C3)\C=C/C(/C=C4)(\C=C5)C%12%17C6%10C7%16C8%14C9%10C%11%12C%13%14C%15%16%17

Properties
Chemical formula	C_{40}H_{24}
Molar mass	504.632 g·mol^{−1}
- Except where otherwise noted, data are given for materials in their standard state (at 25 °C [77 °F], 100 kPa). Infobox references

Hypercubane is a hypothetical polycyclic hydrocarbon with the chemical formula C_{40}H_{24}. It is a molecular analog of the four-dimensional hypercube or tesseract. Hypercubane possesses an unconventional geometry of the carbon framework. It has O_{h} symmetry like classic cubane C_{8}H_{8}. The structure is that of octamethyl cubane—a carbon attached to each corner of cubane itself—having each of those carbon substituents joined to each of its neighbors by an ethylene-1,2-diyl linker to form an outer cage. The edge of each inner core and its outer linker form a cyclohexene.

== History ==
Hypercubane was first proposed in 2014 by Pichierri and studied computationally by density functional theory. The initial model of hypercubane was constructed from octamethylcubane by removing unnecessary hydrogen atoms and adding the ethylene bridges as well as intercarbon bonds between the sp^{2} and sp^{3} atoms. To facilitate the future hypercubane spectroscopic identification chemical shifts for both ^{13}C and ^{1}H NMR-active nuclei have been calculated by Pichierri. Two years later, in 2016, studying the pyrolysis of hypercubane by means of tight-binding molecular dynamics simulations, Maslov and Katin demonstrated that hypercubane possessed high thermal stability comparable with the classic cubane C_{8}H_{8}. It was shown that hypercubane lifetime at room temperature tended to infinity. Therefore, it can be assumed that hypercubane is a kinetically stable molecular system. Among the possible hypercubane decomposition products at high temperatures (more than 1000 K) one can observe polycyclic airscrew-like hydrocarbon C_{34}H_{18} based on three combined graphene fragments passivated by hydrogen atoms and three isolated acetylene molecules.

== Synthesis ==
As of 2026, there has been no method describing the synthesis of hypercubane.

== See also ==
- Basic zinc acetate and basic beryllium acetate, which have a structure resembling a 5-cell
