= Asterane =

Asteranes are members of a series of cage hydrocarbons consisting of two cycloalkane rings linked to each other by methylene groups. Each linking face is thus a cyclohexane, which has a boat conformation. They can be considered as homologues of the prismanes, but with a carbon linker between the faces rather than direct bonding. The molecules having linear, triangular, and square bases, [2]asterane (also known as diasterane), [3]asterane, and [4]asterane, have been synthesized and studied experimentally, and many higher members of the series have been studied using computer models. Modeling experiments predict that the highly symmetric geometry is no longer stable starting with [8]asterane.

== Structures ==
1: Diasterane, 2: Triasterane, 3: Tetrasterane, 4: Pentasterane, 5: Hexasterane, 6: Heptasterane
