= Pagodane =

- Stereo, skeletal formula of pagodane

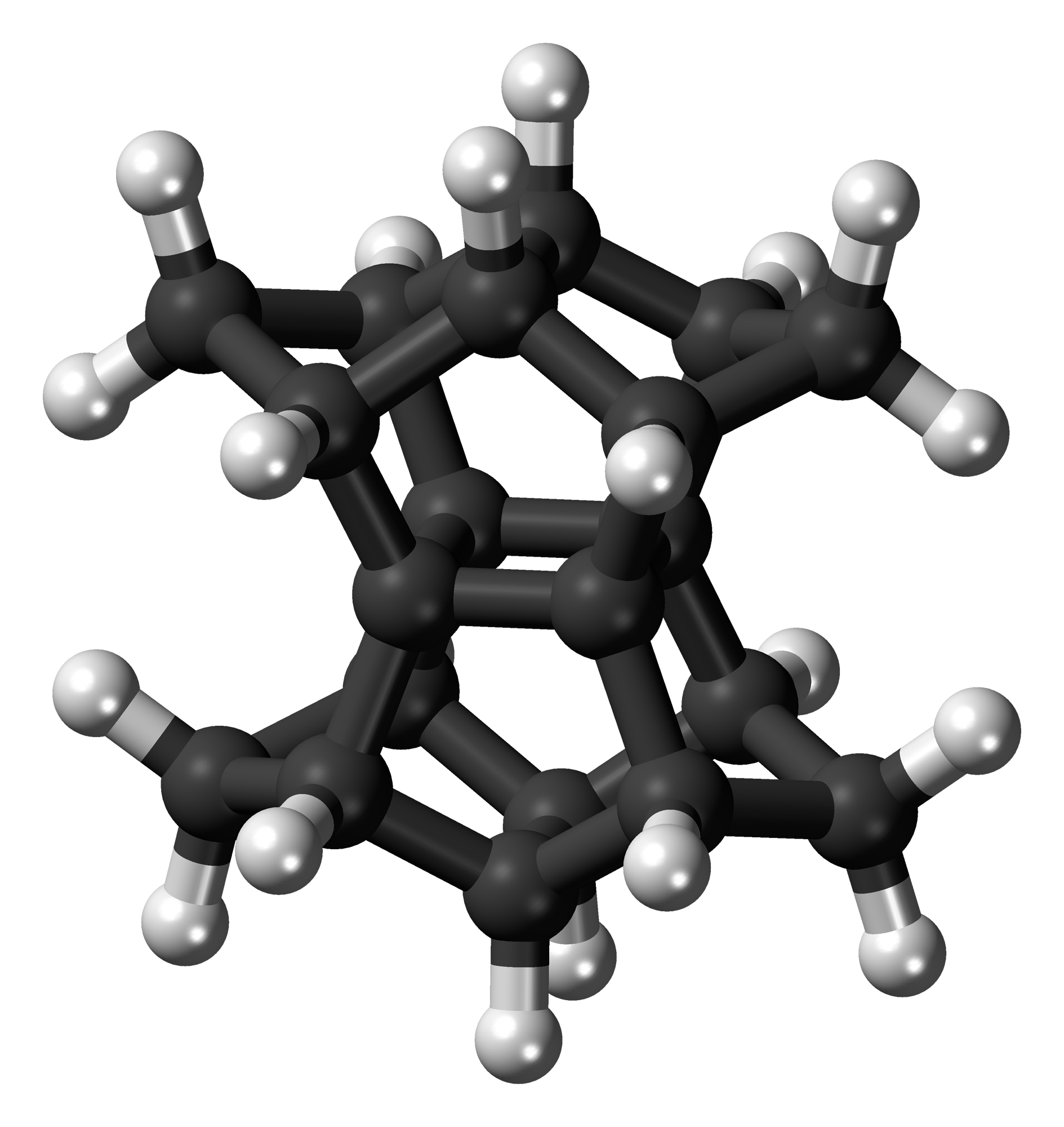
- Ball and stick model of pagodane

Identifiers
CAS Number	89683-62-5
3D model (JSmol)	Interactive image
ChemSpider	128087
PubChem CID	145202
CompTox Dashboard (EPA)	DTXSID101029278
- InChI: InChI=1S/C20H20/c1-5-13-7-2-8-14(13)6(1)18-10-3-9-15-11-4-12(16(10)15)20(8,18)19(7,11)17(5,9)18/h5-16H,1-4H2 Key: HRQVTWFSLAASTF-UHFFFAOYSA-N
- SMILES: C1C2C3C4CC5C3C1C13C6CC7C8C9CC(C68)C51C49C237

Properties
Chemical formula	C_{20}H_{20}
Molar mass	260.380 g·mol^{−1}
Density	1.629 g/ml

Structure
Point group	D_{2h}
Dipole moment	0 D
- Except where otherwise noted, data are given for materials in their standard state (at 25 °C [77 °F], 100 kPa). Infobox references

Pagodane is an organic compound with formula C_{20}H_{20} whose carbon skeleton was said to resemble a pagoda, hence the name. It is a polycyclic hydrocarbon whose molecule has the D_{2h} point symmetry group. The compound is a highly crystalline solid that melts at 243 °C, is barely soluble in most organic solvents and moderately soluble in benzene and chloroform. It sublimes at low pressure.

The name pagodane is used more generally for any member of a family of compounds whose molecular skeletons have the same 16-carbon central cage as the basic compound. Each member can be seen as the result of connecting eight atoms of this cage in pairs by four alkane chains. The general member is denoted [m.n.p.q]pagodane where m, n, p and q are the number of carbons of those four chains. The general formula is then C_{16+s}H_{12+2s} where s= m+n+p+q. In particular, the basic compound C_{20}H_{20} has those carbons connected by four methylene bridges (m=n=p=q=1), and its name within that family is therefore [1.1.1.1]pagodane.

== Synthesis and structure ==
The compound was first synthesized by Horst Prinzbach and his associates in 1987, by a 14-step sequence starting from isodrin. In the process they also synthesized [2.2.1.1]pagodane C_{22}H_{24} and several derivatives.

Prinzbach remarked that "the obvious need for [the short name 'pagodane'] can be readily understood in view of the von Baeyer/IUPAC and Chemical Abstracts nomenclature", undecacyclo[9.9.0.0^{1,5}.0^{2,12}.0^{2,18}.0^{3,7}.0^{6,10}.0^{8,12}.0^{11,15}.0^{13,17}.0^{16,20}]icosane.

In carbon skeleton of pagodane, there can be distinguished many propellane-type fragments.

The overall synthesis can be summarized as follows:

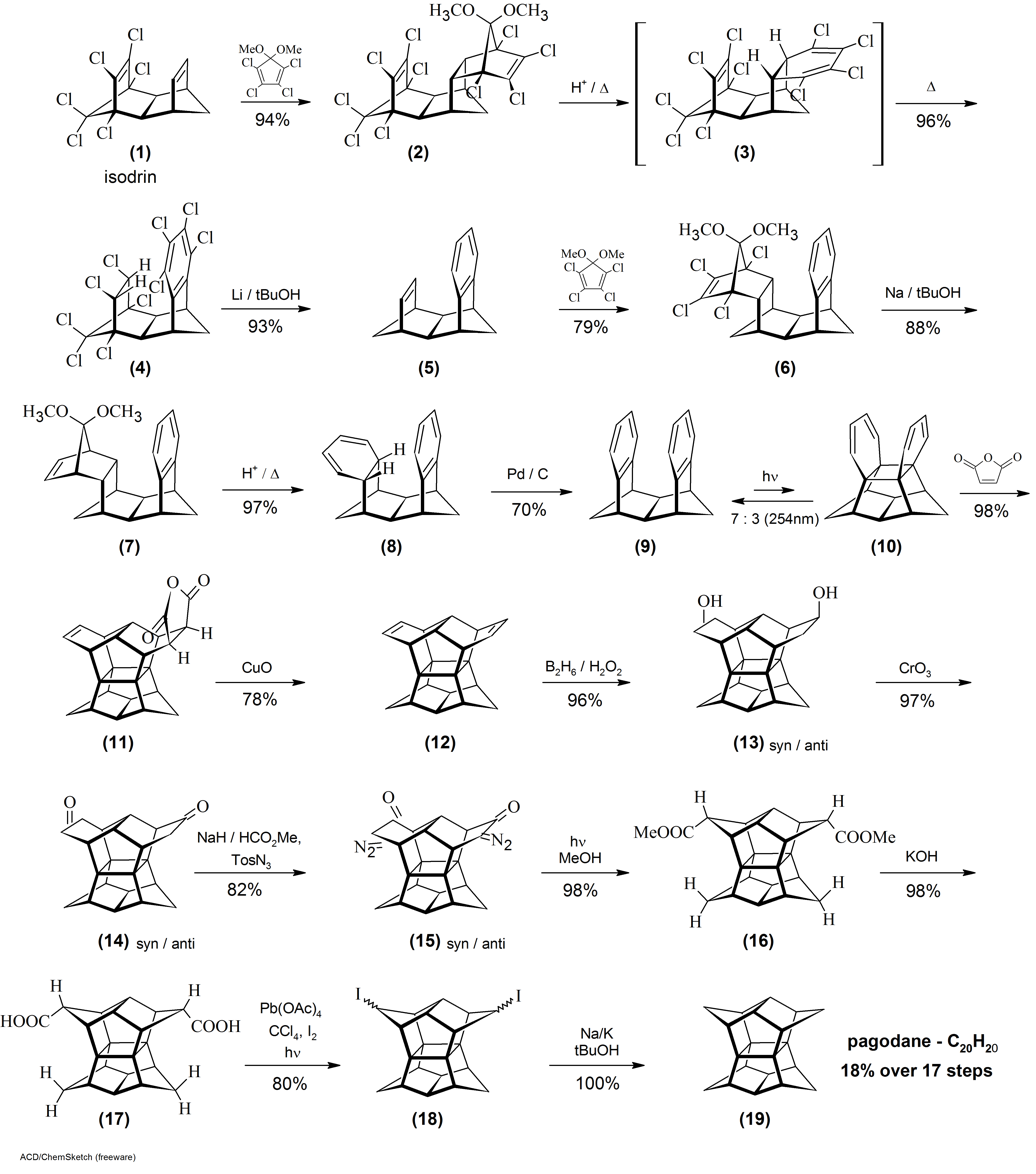
Synthesis of pagodane starting from isodrin

The scheme depicted here may be shortened to 14 one-pot operations with 24% overall yield. Yet, this variation requires the use of tetrachlorothiophenedioxide instead of tetrachloro-dimethoxycyclopentadiene in two of the early steps. While fewer steps and higher yield look attractive at first sight, this approach had to be given up due to high cost and restricted availability of the dioxide.

== Derivatives ==
Several derivatives are available, such as the diketone C_{20}H_{16}O_{2} (melting point about 322 °C).

Both [1.1.1.1]pagodane and [2.2.1.1]pagodane form dications in SbF_{5}/SO_{2}ClF. In these cations the electron deficiency is spread over the central cyclobutane ring. These dications were the first examples to show the phenomenon of σ-bishomoaromaticity which was subsequently studied by the Prinzbach group to great length.

Pagodane is an isomer of dodecahedrane and can be chemically converted to it.

== See also ==
- List of chemical compounds with unusual names
