= Cuneane =

Saturated hydrocarbon compound (C8H8)

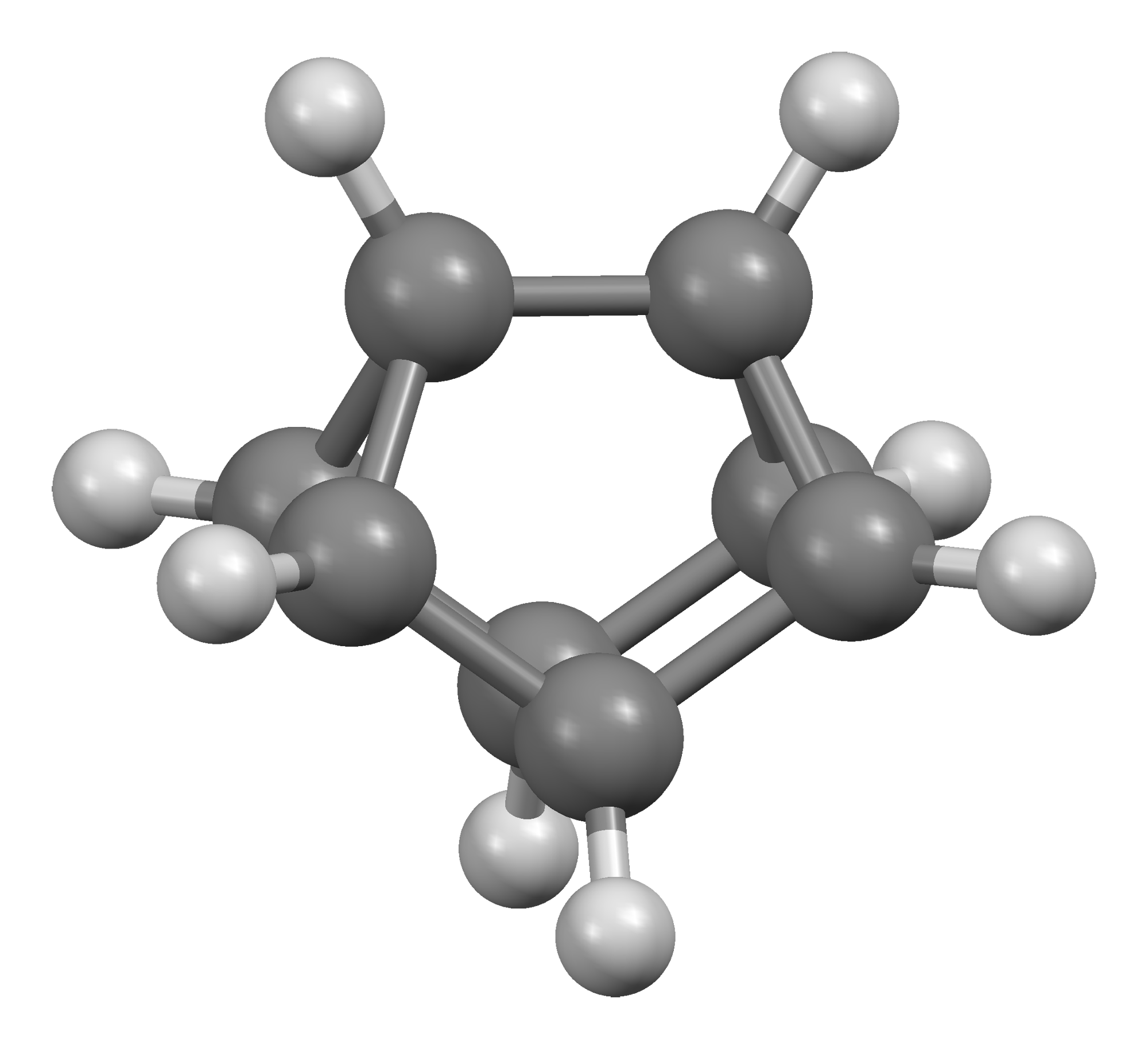
- Ball and stick model of cuneane (1R,2R,3S,4S,5S,6R,7R,8S)

Names
- Preferred IUPAC name Pentacyclo[3.3.0.0^{2,4}.0^{3,7}.0^{6,8}]octane

Identifiers
| CAS Number | 20656-23-9 |
| 3D model (JSmol) | Interactive image |
| ChemSpider | 124127 |
| PubChem CID | 140734 |
| CompTox Dashboard (EPA) | DTXSID20942857 |
- InChI: InChI=1S/C8H8/c1-2-5(1)6-3-4(6)8(2)7(1)3/h1-8H Key: YIJMEXRVJPVGIY-UHFFFAOYSA-N
- SMILES: C12C3C4C3C5C1C2C45

Properties
| Chemical formula | C_{8}H_{8} |
| Molar mass | 104.152 g·mol^{−1} |
| Density | 1.578 g/ml |
- Except where otherwise noted, data are given for materials in their standard state (at 25 °C [77 °F], 100 kPa). Infobox references

Cuneane (from Latin cuneus 'wedge') is a saturated hydrocarbon with the formula C_{8}H_{8} and a 3D structure resembling a wedge, hence the name. Cuneane may be produced from cubane by metal-ion-catalyzed σ-bond rearrangement. Similar reactions are known for homocubane (C_{9}H_{10}) and bishomocubane (C_{10}H_{12}).

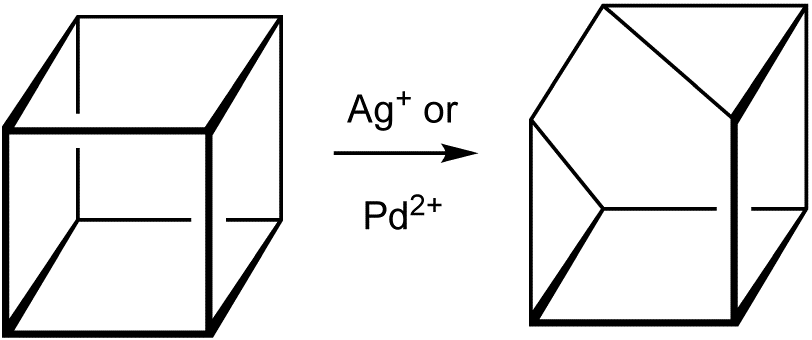
Synthesis of cuneane from cubane

== Molecular geometry ==
The carbon atoms in the cuneane molecule form a hexahedron with point group C_{2v}. The cuneane molecule has three kinds of equivalent carbon atoms (A, B, C), which have also been confirmed by NMR. The molecular graph of the carbon skeleton of cuneane is a regular graph with non-equivalent groups of vertices, and so it is a very important test object for different algorithms of mathematical chemistry.

Equivalent carbon atoms in cuneane

== Derivatives ==
Some cuneane derivatives have liquid crystal properties.
