= Leo Paquette =

American organic chemist (1934–2019)

- Born: July 15, 1934; Worcester, Massachusetts, U.S.
- Died: January 21, 2019 (aged 84); Columbus, Ohio, U.S.
- Education: College of the Holy Cross (BS); Massachusetts Institute of Technology (PhD)
- Known for: Dodecahedrane synthesis
- Awards: Arthur P. Sloan Fellowship; Guggenheim Fellowship; Arthur C. Cope Scholar Award (1987); Ernest Guenther Award (1992)
- Scientific career
- Fields: Organic chemistry
- Workplaces: Upjohn Company; Ohio State University
- Doctoral advisor: Norman A. Nelson

Leo Armand Paquette (July 15, 1934 – January 21, 2019) was an American organic chemist.

== Biography ==
Paquette was born on July 15, 1934, in Worcester, Massachusetts. He received a Bachelor of Science (B.S.) in 1956 from the College of the Holy Cross and a Ph.D. in organic chemistry from the Massachusetts Institute of Technology in 1959, under the supervision of Norman Allan Nelson. After serving as a research associate at the Upjohn Company from 1959 to 1963, he joined the faculty of Ohio State University (OSU) where he mentored approximately 150 doctoral students, 300 postdoctoral associates, and countless masters students and undergraduates.

Paquette was promoted to full professor at OSU in 1969 and was named Distinguished University Professor in 1987. He was elected a member of the National Academy of Sciences in 1984, and was the founding editor of the Electronic Encyclopedia of Reagents for Organic Synthesis (e-EROS). Paquette is best known for achieving the first total synthesis of the Platonic solid dodecahedrane. He authored over 1300 peer-reviewed papers, 38 book chapters, and 17 books. He also lectured at various institutions both domestically and internationally.

== Honors ==
Paquette's honors include Sloan Fellow, Guggenheim Fellow, ACS Award for Creative Work in Synthetic Organic Chemistry, and the Arthur C. Cope Scholar Award of the ACS. In 1984 he was awarded the ACS Award for Creative Work in Synthetic Organic Chemistry and was elected to the National Academy of Sciences that same year.

== Scientific misconduct ==
In 1993, an Ohio State University investigation found that Paquette had plagiarized sections from an unfunded NIH grant application, for which he was a reviewer, and included the text in his own NIH grant application. The Office of Research Integrity agreed with the university investigation and "required institutional certification of proper attribution in any future grant proposals" from Paquette and "prohibited him from serving on Public Health Service Advisory Committees, Boards, or review groups" for ten years.

For a separate plagiarism incident that occurred in 1991, the Ohio State University investigatory panel found that Paquette had plagiarized a NSF proposal, that he was also a reviewer for, and included sections in a paper he published in the Journal of the American Chemical Society. The NSF's Office of Inspector General (OIG) found that Paquette knowingly "submitted falsified evidence for the purpose of disproving the misconduct in science charge" and made "false statements under oath in the OIG investigation concerning the authenticity of the evidence". The falsified evidence consisted of a computer disk that included a "'mock draft,' a copy of the paper's final draft that Paquette had marked up to look like an earlier draft" and was back-dated prior to Paquette's review of the NSF proposal and, importantly, prior to the manufacture of the disk. The US Secret Service also found that someone had attempted to erase the lot number of the disk. In 1998, the NSF entered into a binding settlement with Paquette: Paquette would voluntarily exclude himself from any federal funding for two years and the NSF would not "issue a finding of misconduct in science".

== Death ==
On January 21, 2019, Paquette died of Parkinson's disease.

== Books ==
- Encyclopedia of reagents for organic synthesis, 2009
- Handbook of reagents for organic synthesis, 1999-2007
- Organic Reactions, Editor-In-Chief, Vols. 38-55
- Encyclopedia of reagents for organic synthesis, 1995
- Comprehensive Organic Synthesis: Combining C-C pi-bonds, 1992
- Polyquinane chemistry : syntheses and reactions, 1987
- Recent synthetic developments in polyquinane chemistry, 1984
- Organic chemistry, 1979
- Principles of modern heterocyclic chemistry, 1968

== See also ==
- List of scientific misconduct incidents
