= Horst Prinzbach =

German chemist (1931–2012)

Horst Prinzbach (20 July 1931 in Haslach im Kinzigtal – 18 September 2012 in Freiburg im Breisgau) was a German chemist and professor emeritus.

Prinzbach studied chemistry at the University of Freiburg and received his PhD under Arthur Lüttringhaus. He joined William von Eggers Doering at Yale University for postdoctoral work. In 1962 he completed his habilitation at Freiburg with a dissertation on sesquifulvalenes. In 1965 he became a professor of organic chemistry at the University of Lausanne, Switzerland, and in 1969 he became a full professor in organic chemistry at Freiburg.

== Main research activities ==
Dodecahedrane

Pagodane

Of his many research interests in organic chemistry, including photochemistry with unusual chromophores, synthesis of new carba-/hetera cages, radical cations, dications, total synthesis of aminoglycoside antibiotics, and enzymes, Prinzbach was probably best known for the pagodane route towards dodecahedrane. In the course of his research, the phenomenon of σ-bishomoaromaticity was discovered as an extreme case of chemical bonding. The final landmark the development of dodecahedrane chemistry over many years was the preparation and characterisation of C20 fullerene in the gas phase based on bromination-elimination reactions of dodecahedrane.

=== σ-Bishomoaromaticity ===
σ-Bishomoaromaticity is an extreme case of chemical bonding and aromaticity. It was found by the Prinzbach when they synthesized dodecahedrane via the Pagodane route.

== Honors ==
- Adolf-von-Baeyer-Denkmünze (Adolf von Baeyer Medal) of the German Chemical Society Gesellschaft Deutscher Chemiker (1989)
