= Polycyclic compound =

Chemical compound having multiple closed rings

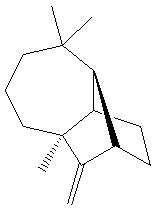
Longifolene, a terpene natural product, and an example of a tricyclic molecule

Cholesterol, another terpene natural product, in particular, a steroid, a class of tetracyclic molecules

Benzo[a]pyrene, a pentacyclic compound both natural and man-made

Pagodane, a man-made polycyclic compound

In the field of organic chemistry, a polycyclic compound is an organic compound featuring several closed rings of atoms, primarily carbon. These ring substructures include cycloalkanes, aromatics, and other ring types. They come in sizes of three atoms and upward, and in combinations of linkages that include tethering (such as in biaryls), fusing (edge-to-edge, such as in anthracene and steroids), links via a single atom (such as in spiro compounds), bridged compounds, and longifolene. Though poly- literally means "many", there is some latitude in determining how many rings are required to be considered polycyclic; many smaller rings are described by specific prefixes (e.g., bicyclic, tricyclic, tetracyclic, etc.), and so while it can refer to these, the title term is used with most specificity when these alternative names and prefixes are unavailable.

In general, the term polycyclic includes polycyclic aromatic compounds, including polycyclic aromatic hydrocarbons, as well as heterocyclic aromatic compounds with multiple rings (where heteroaromatic compounds are aromatic compounds that contain sulfur, nitrogen, oxygen, or another non-carbon atoms in their rings in addition to carbon).

An example of a polycyclic compound based on a nitrogen cage is hexanitrohexaazaisowurtzitane.

Brevetoxin A, a natural product with ten rings, all fused, and all heterocyclic, and a toxic component associated with the organisms responsible for red tides. The R group at right refers to one of several possible four-carbon side chains. (See Brevetoxin.)

== Naming ==
There is a scheme for naming polycyclic compounds using square brackets [] and numbers. (See Cycloalkane § Nomenclature and Bicyclic molecule § Nomenclature.)

== See also ==
- Polycyclic aromatic compound
- Polycyclic aromatic hydrocarbon
