= Trinitramide =

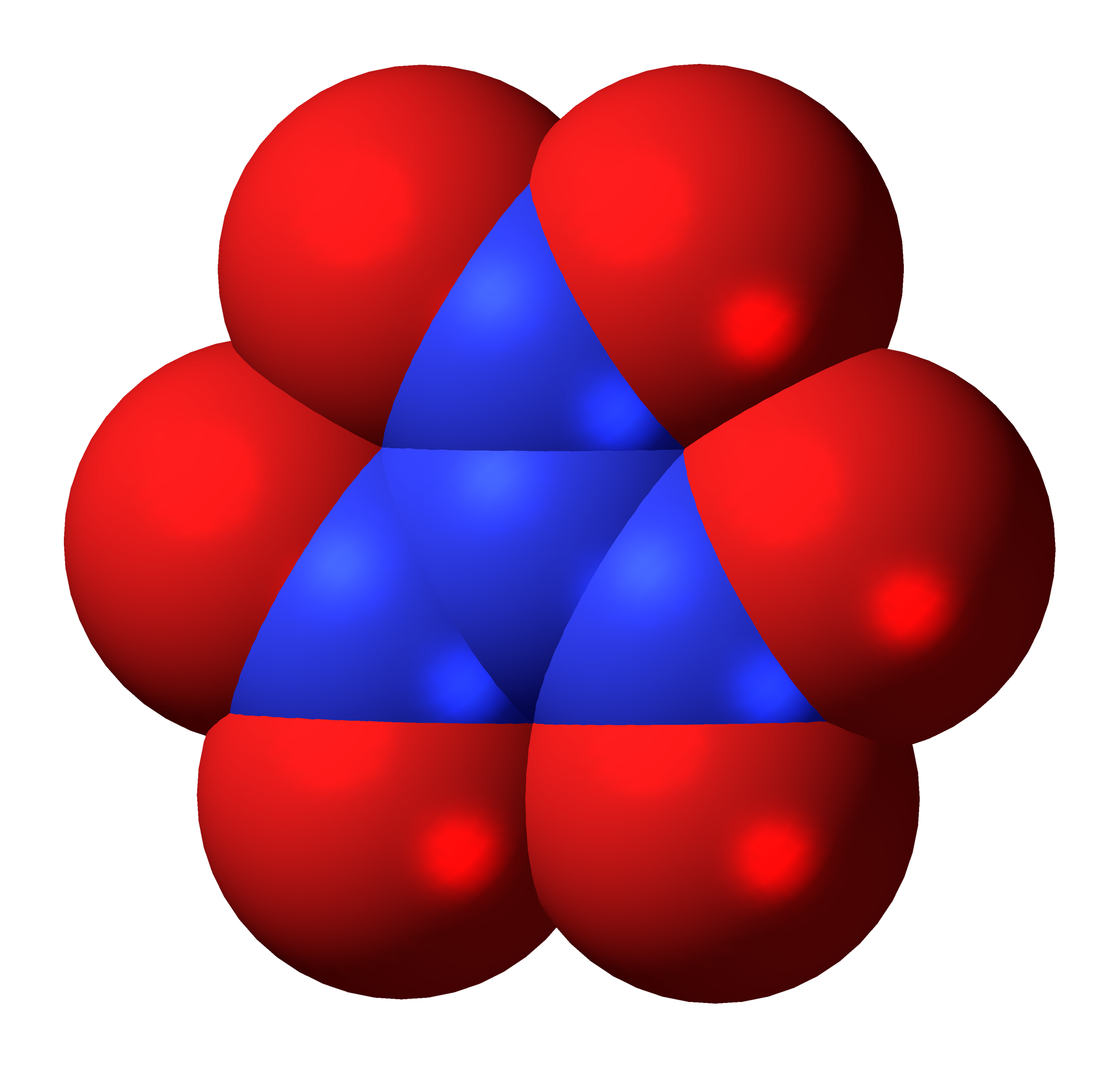

Names
- IUPAC name N,N-Dinitronitramide
- Other names: Trinitroamine; Trinitroammonia

Identifiers
CAS Number	113282-38-5
3D model (JSmol)	Interactive image; Interactive image
ChemSpider	24751851
PubChem CID	57459337
CompTox Dashboard (EPA)	DTXSID30726660
- InChI: InChI=1S/N4O6/c5-2(6)1(3(7)8)4(9)10 Key: LZLKDWBQTGTOQY-UHFFFAOYSA-N
- SMILES: O=N(=O)N(N(=O)=O)N(=O)=O; N([N+](=O)[O-])([N+](=O)[O-])[N+](=O)[O-]

Properties
Chemical formula	N(NO_{2})_{3}
Molar mass	152.022 g·mol^{−1}

Related compounds
Related compounds	Ammonia; Nitramide; Dinitramide; Dinitrogen pentoxide; Tetranitromethane; Nitroformate
- Except where otherwise noted, data are given for materials in their standard state (at 25 °C [77 °F], 100 kPa). verify (what is ?) Infobox references

Trinitramide is a nitrogen oxide with the molecular formula N(NO_{2})_{3}. The compound was detected and described in 2010 by researchers at the Royal Institute of Technology (KTH) in Sweden. It is made of a nitrogen atom bonded to three nitro groups (−NO_{2}).

Earlier, there had been speculation whether trinitramide could exist. Theoretical calculations by Montgomery and Michels in 1993 showed that the compound was likely to be stable.

== Preparation ==
Trinitramide is prepared by the nitration reaction of either potassium dinitramide or ammonium dinitramide with nitronium tetrafluoroborate in acetonitrile at low temperatures.

[NH_{4}]^{+}[N(NO_{2})_{2}]^{−} + [NO_{2}]^{+}[BF_{4}]^{−} → N(NO_{2})_{3} + [NH_{4}]^{+}[BF_{4}]^{−}

== Uses ==
Trinitramide has a potential use as one of the most efficient and least polluting of rocket propellant oxidizers, as it is chlorine-free. This is potentially an important development, because the Tsiolkovsky rocket equation implies that even small improvements in specific impulse yields a similar change in delta-v, which can make large improvements in the size of practical rocket launch payloads. The density impulse (impulse per volume) of a trinitramide based propellant could be 20 to 30 percent better than most existing formulations, however the specific impulse (impulse per mass) of formulations with liquid oxygen is higher.
