= Flare (countermeasure) =

Aerial defence against heat-seeking missiles

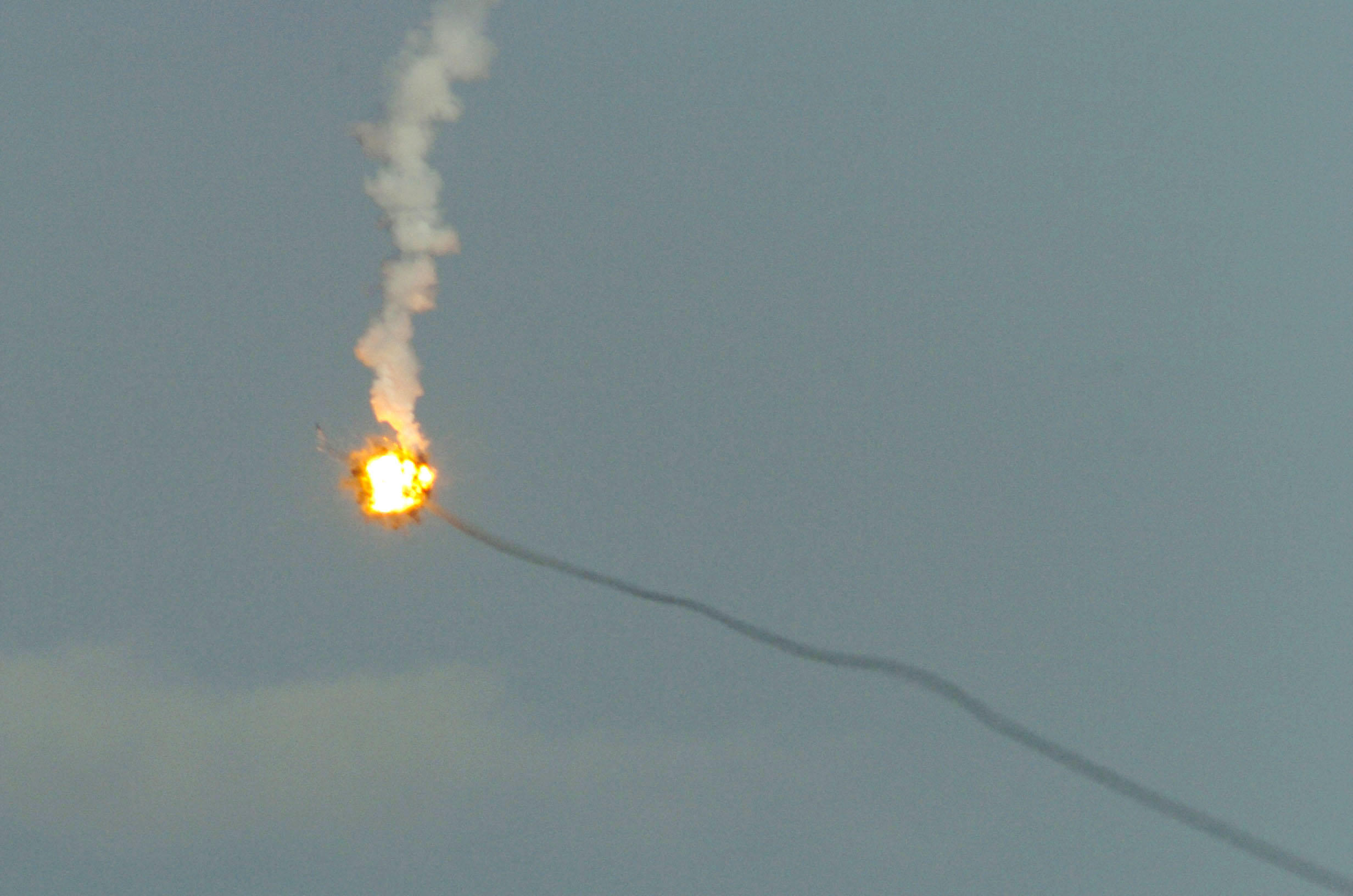
An infrared guided AIM-9M Sidewinder missile hitting a flare

A US Army AH-64 Apache releasing decoy flares

A flare or decoy flare is an aerial infrared countermeasure used by an aircraft to counter an infrared homing ("heat-seeking") surface-to-air missile or air-to-air missile. Flares are commonly composed of a pyrotechnic composition based on magnesium or another hot-burning metal, with burning temperature equal to or hotter than engine exhaust. The aim is to make the infrared-guided missile seek out the heat signature from the flare rather than the aircraft's engines.

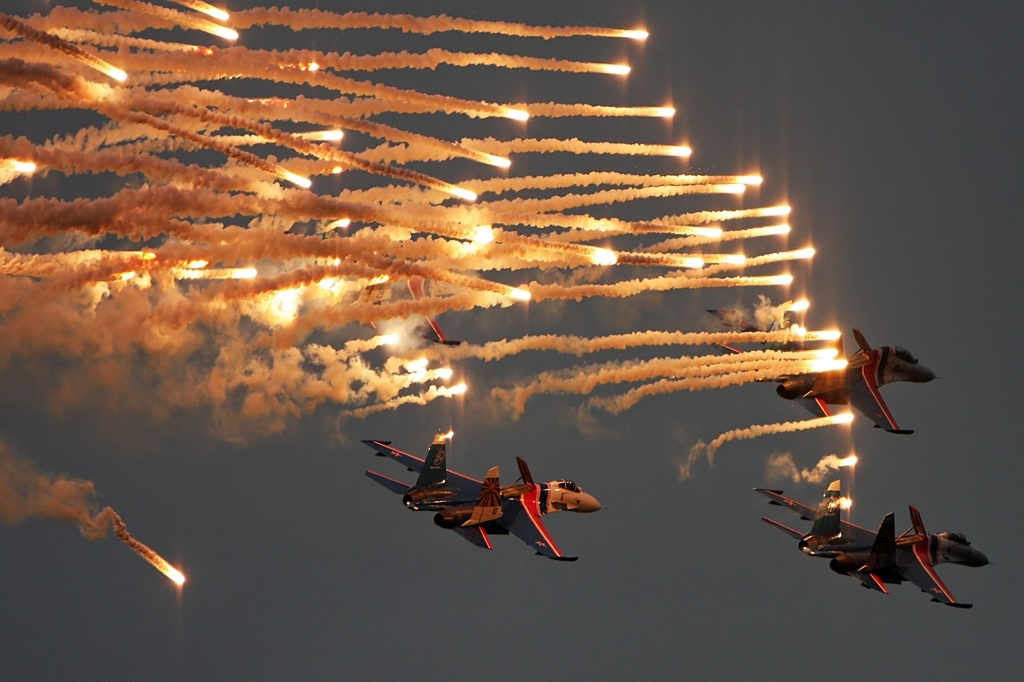
Russian Knights fire their flares as a salute to Igor Tkachenko.

== Tactics ==
In contrast to radar-guided missiles, IR-guided missiles are very difficult to find as they approach aircraft. They do not emit detectable radar, and they are generally fired from behind, directly toward the engines. In most cases, pilots have to rely on their wingmen to spot the missile's smoke trail and alert of a launch. Since IR-guided missiles have a shorter range than their radar-guided counterparts, good situational awareness of altitude and potential threats continues to be an effective defense. More advanced electro-optical systems can detect missile launches automatically from the distinct thermal emissions of a missile's rocket motor.

Once the presence of a "live" IR missile is indicated, flares are released by the aircraft in an attempt to decoy the missile. Some systems are automatic, while others require manual jettisoning of the flares. The aircraft would then pull away at a sharp angle from the flare (and the terminal trajectory of the missile) and reduce engine power in an attempt to cool the thermal signature. Ideally the missile's seeker head is then confused by this change in temperature and flurry of new heat signatures, and starts to follow one of the flares rather than the aircraft.

More modern IR-guided missiles have sophisticated on-board electronics and secondary electro-optical sensors that help discriminate between flares and targets, reducing the effectiveness of flares as a reactionary countermeasure. A newer procedure involves preemptively deploying flares in anticipation of a missile launch, which distorts the expected image of the target should one be let loose. This "pre-flaring" increases the chances that the missile then follows the flares or the open sky in between, rather than a part of the actual defender.

== Usage ==
Apart from military use, some civilian aircraft are also equipped with countermeasure flares, against terrorism: the Israeli airline El Al, having been the target of the failed 2002 airliner attack, in which shoulder-launched surface-to-air missiles were fired at an airliner while taking off, began equipping its fleet with radar-based, automated flare release countermeasures from June 2004. This caused concerns in some European countries, which proceeded to ban such aircraft from landing at their airports.

On 18 June 2017, after an AIM-9X did not successfully track a targeted Syrian Air Force Su-22 Fitter, US Navy Lt. Cmdr. Michael "Mob" Tremel flying a F/A-18E Super Hornet used an AMRAAM missile to successfully destroy the enemy aircraft. There is a theory that the Sidewinder is tested against American and not Soviet/Russian flares. The Sidewinder is used to rejecting American but not Soviet/Russian flares. Similar issues arose from the testing of the AIM-9P model. The missile would ignore American flares but go for Soviet ones due to these flares having "different burn time, intensity and separation."

== Decoying ==
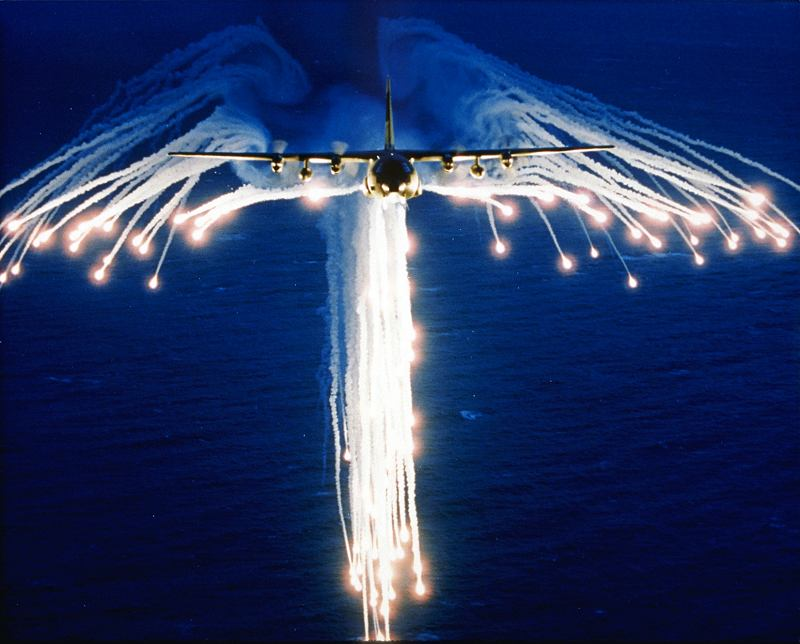
A C-130 Hercules deploying flares

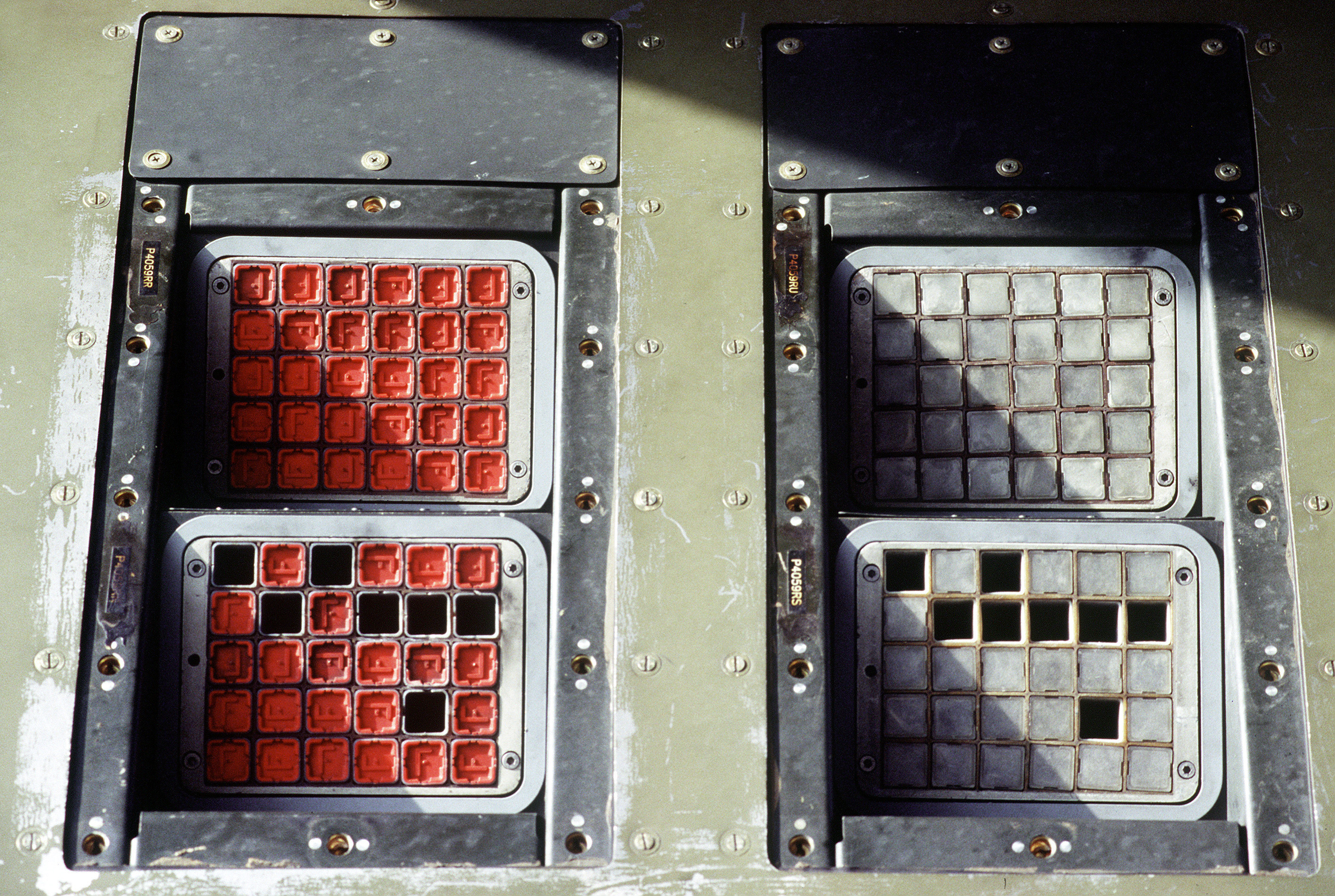
C-130 flare and chaff dispensers

Flares burn at thousands of degrees Celsius, which is much hotter than the exhaust of a jet engine. IR missiles seek out the hotter flame, believing it to be an aircraft in afterburner or the beginning of the engine's exhaust source.

As the more modern infrared seekers tend to have spectral sensitivity tailored to more closely match the emissions of airplanes and reject other sources (the so-called CCM, or counter-countermeasures), the modernized decoy flares have their emission spectrum optimized to also match the radiation of the airplane (mainly its engines and engine exhaust). In addition to spectral discrimination, the CCMs can include trajectory discrimination and detection of size of the radiation source.

The newest generation of the FIM-92 Stinger uses a dual IR and UV seeker head, which allows for a redundant tracking solution, effectively negating the effectiveness of modern decoy flares (according to the U.S. Department of Defense). While research and development in flare technology has produced an IR signature on the same wavelength as hot engine exhaust, modern flares still produce a notably (and immutably) different UV signature than an aircraft engine burning kerosene jet-fuel.

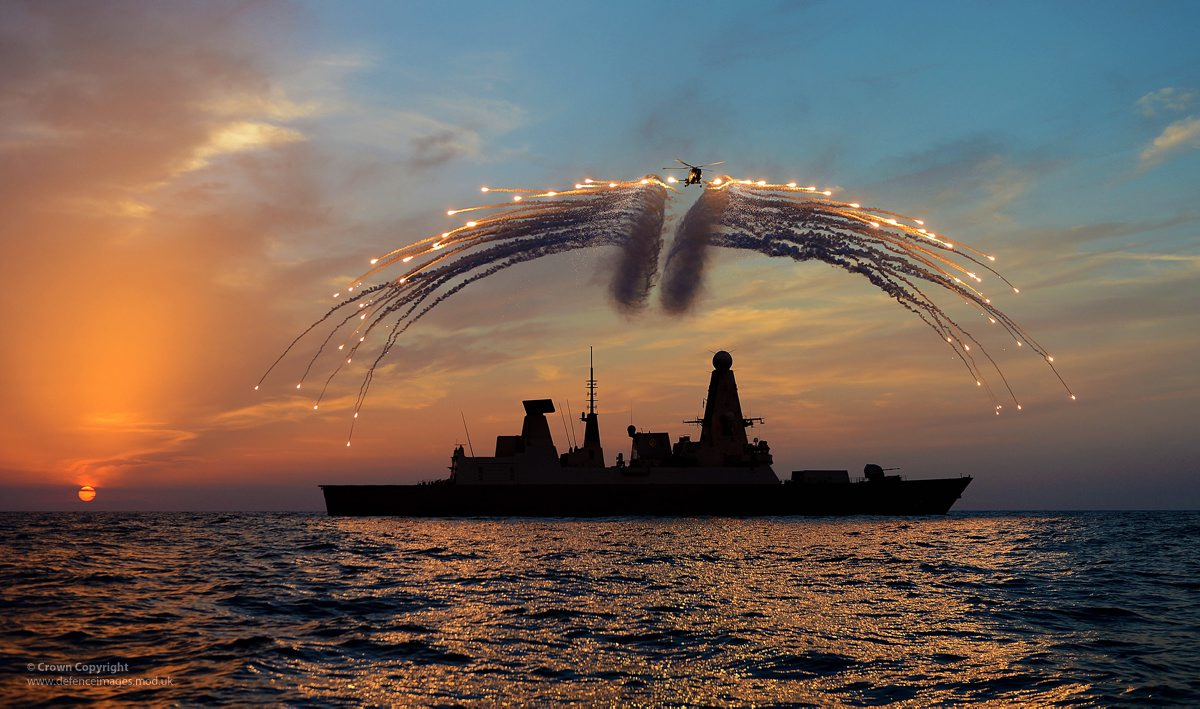
HMS Dragon's Westland Lynx helicopter fires flares during an exercise over the Type 45 destroyer

== Materials used ==
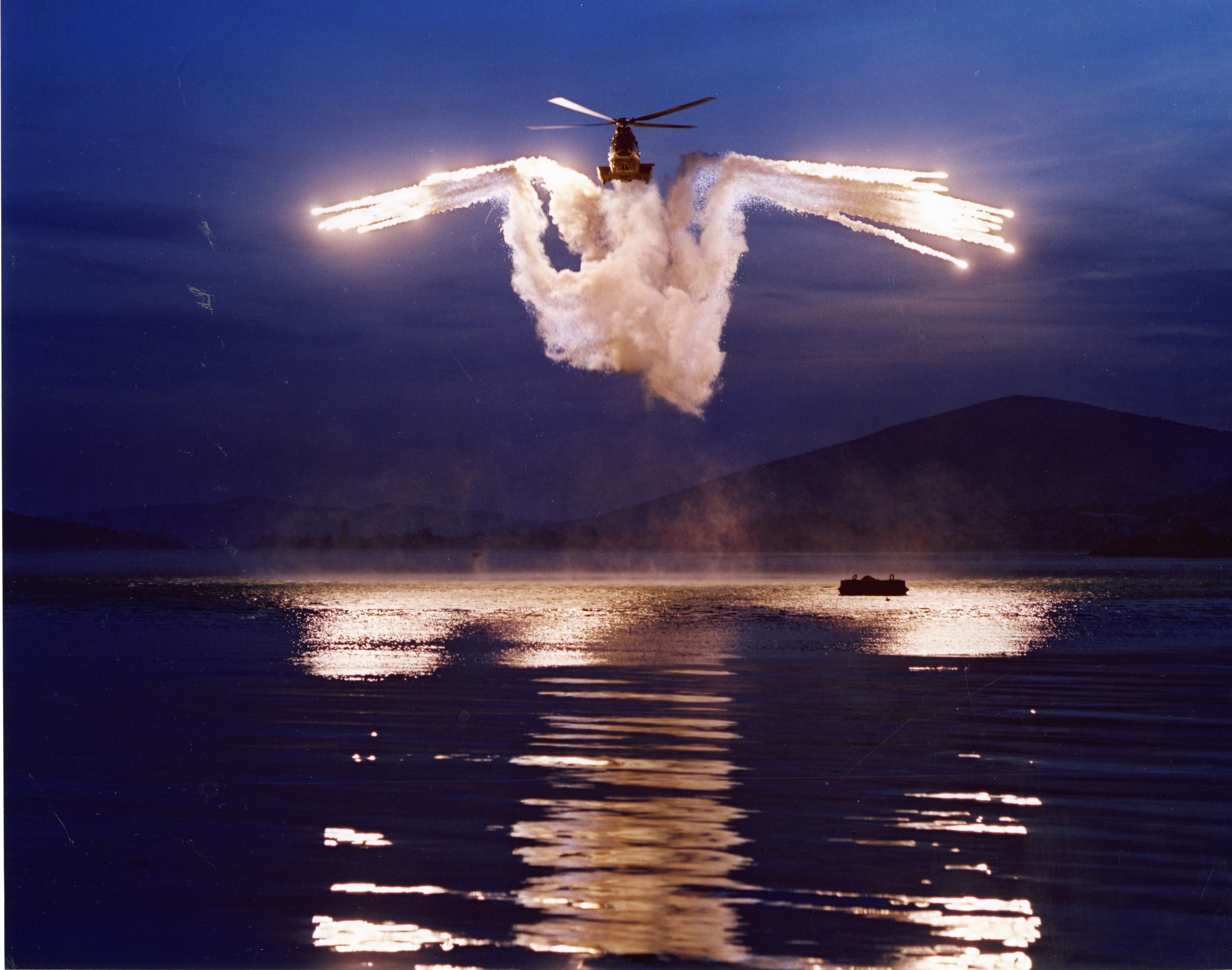
A Dutch Eurocopter AS532 Cougar fires its flares during a night exercise.

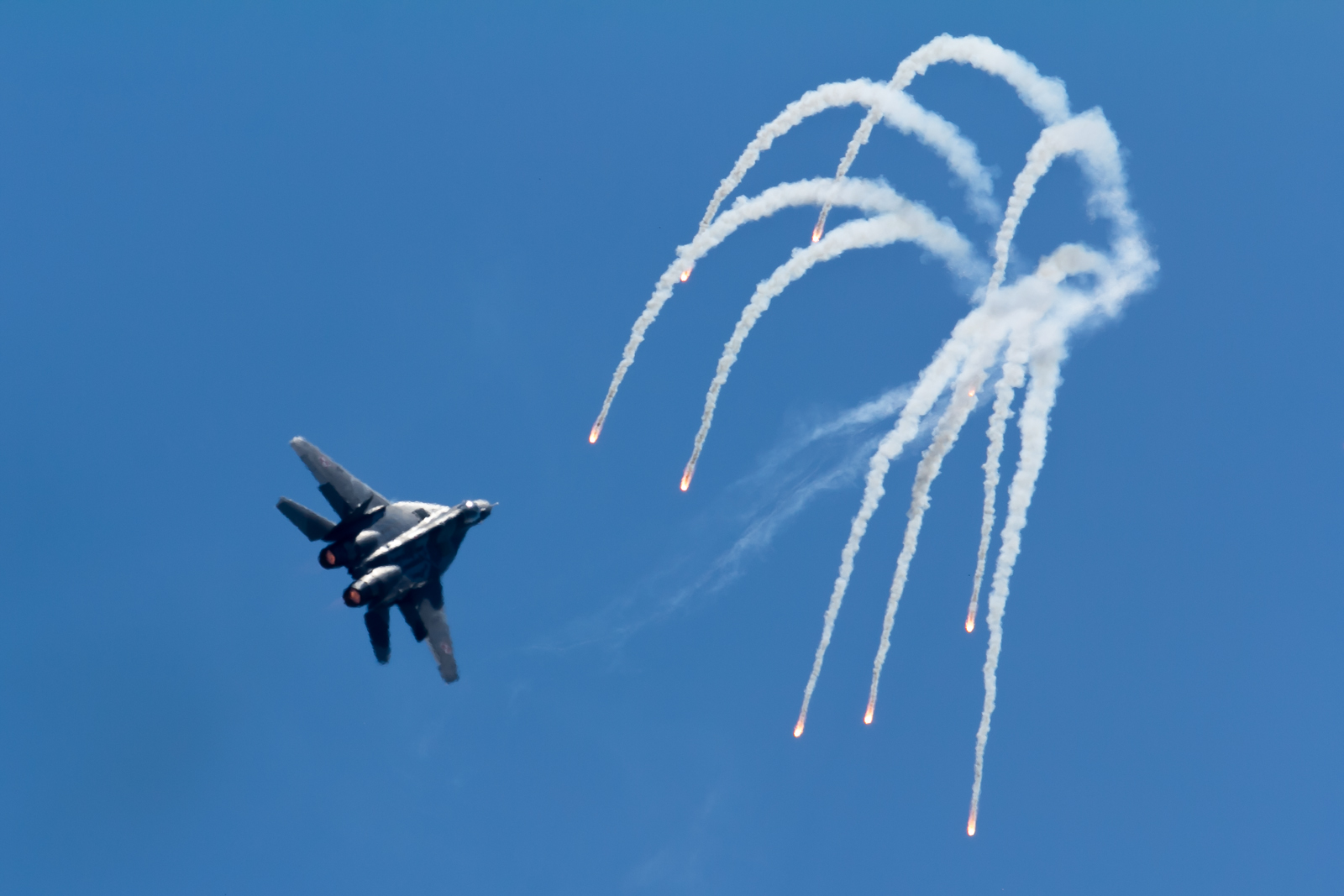
Polish Air Force MiG-29 at the 2014 Rome International Air Show

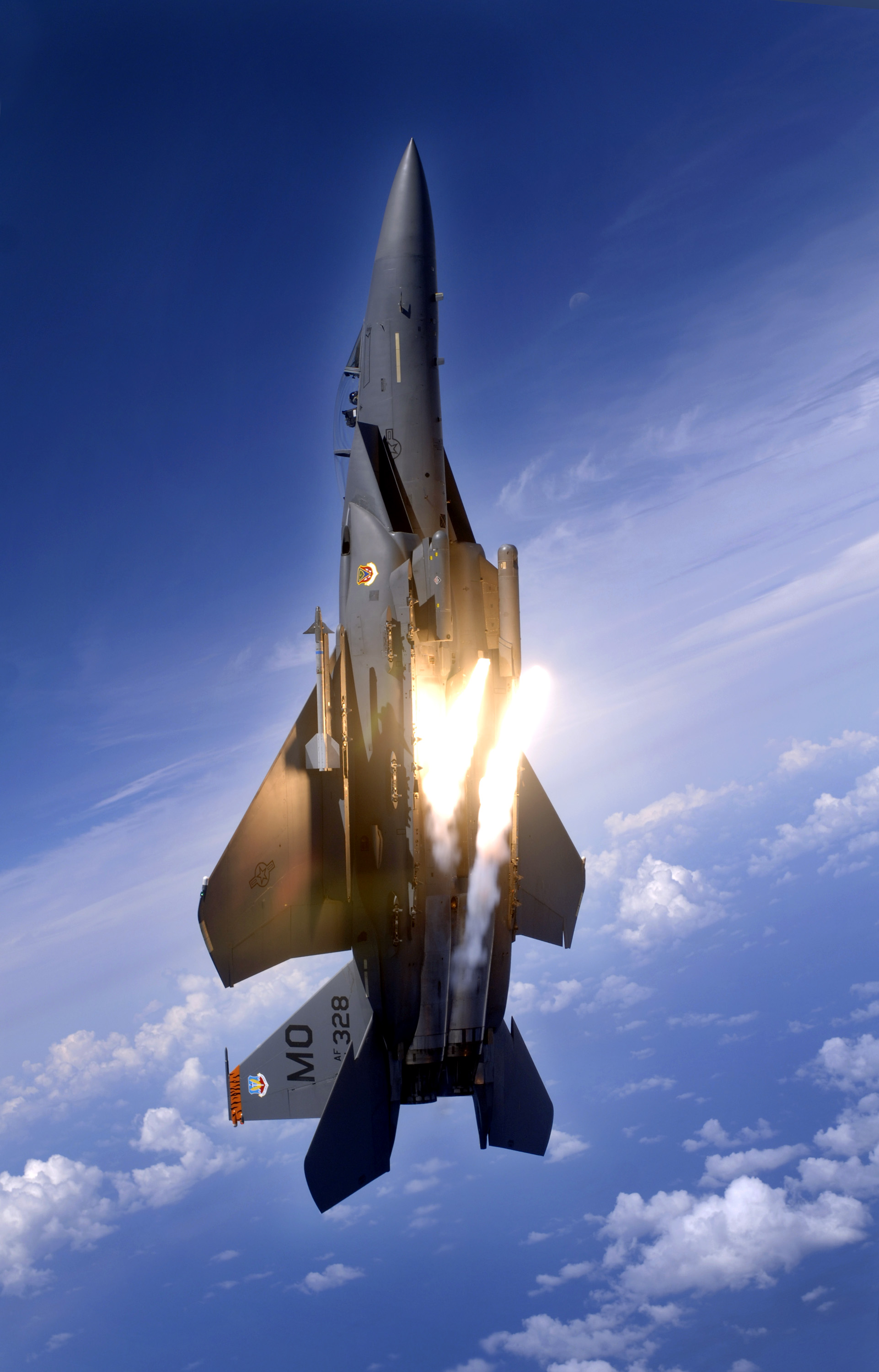
An F-15E Strike Eagle releasing flares

For the infrared generating charge, two approaches are possible: pyrotechnic and pyrophoric as stored, chemical-energy-source IR-decoy flares contain pyrotechnic compositions, liquid or solid pyrophoric substances, or liquid or solid highly flammable substances.

Upon ignition of the decoy flare, a strongly exothermal reaction is started, releasing infrared energy and visible smoke and flame, emission being dependent on the chemical nature of the payload used.

There is a wide variety of calibres and shapes available for aerial decoy flares. Due to volume storage restrictions onboard platforms, many aircraft of American origin use square decoy flare cartridges. Nevertheless, cylindrical cartridges are also available onboard American aircraft, such as MJU 23/B on the B-1 Lancer or MJU-8A/B on the F/A-18 Hornet; however, these are used mainly onboard French aircraft and those of Russian origin (e.g. PPI-26 IW on the MiG 29).

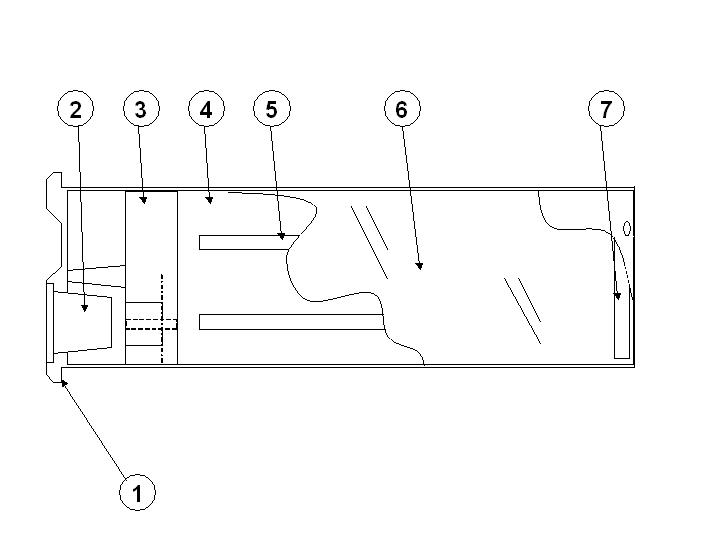
Schematic view of a MJU-7A/B decoy flare cartridge : anodised aluminium cartridge (1); an electrical impulse cartridge (2), providing both expulsion and, in some cases, direct ignition of the payload; a pusher plate acting as a safe&arm device (3); the payload (4) with first fire layer (5); the wrapping self-adhesive polyester reinforced aluminum foil (6); and a front washer (7).

Square calibres and typical decoy flares:

- 1×1×8 inch, e.g. M-206, MJU-61, (Magnesium/Teflon/Viton (MTV) based) M-211, M-212 (spectral flares)
- 2×1×8 inch, e.g. MJU-7A/B (MTV based), MJU-59/B (spectral flare)
- 2×2.5×8 inch, e.g. MJU-10/B (MTV based)

Cylindrical calibres and typical decoy flares:

- 2.5 inch, e.g. MJU-23/B (MTV based)
- 1.5 inch, e.g. MJU 8 A/B (MTV based)
- 1 inch, e.g. PPI 26 IW

=== Pyrotechnic flares ===
Pyrotechnic flares use a slow-burning fuel-oxidizer mixture that generates intense heat. Thermite-like mixtures (e.g. Magnesium/Teflon/Viton [MTV]), are common. Other combinations include ammonium perchlorate/anthracene/magnesium, or can be based on red phosphorus.

To adjust the emission characteristics to match closer the spectrum of jet engines, charges on the base of double base propellants. These compositions can avoid the metal content and achieve cleaner burning without the prominent smoke trail.

==== Blackbody payloads ====
Certain pyrotechnic compositions, for example MTV, give a great flame emission upon combustion and yield a temperature-dependent signature and can be understood as gray bodies of high emissivity ($e$~0.95). Such payloads are called blackbody payloads. Other payloads, like iron/potassium perchlorate pellets, only yield a low flame emission but also show temperature-dependent signature. Nevertheless, the lower combustion temperature as compared to MTV results in a lower amount of energy released in the short-wavelength IR range. Other blackbody payloads include ammonium perchlorate/anthracene/magnesium and hydroxyl-terminated polybutadiene (HTPB) binder.

==== Spectrally balanced payloads ====
A sectional of the typical LLU-2B ground-illumination flare

Other payloads provide large amounts of hot carbon dioxide upon combustion and thus provide a temperature-independent selective emission in the wavelength range between 3 and 5 μm. Typical pyrotechnic payloads of this type resemble whistling compositions and are often made up from potassium perchlorate and hydrogen lean organic fuels. Other spectrally balanced payloads are made up similarly as double base propellants and contain nitrocellulose (NC), and other esters of nitric acid or nitro compounds as oxidizers such as hexanitroethane and nitro compounds and nitramines as high-energy fuels.

=== Pyrophoric flares ===
Pyrophoric flares work on the principle of ejecting a special pyrophoric material out of an airtight cartridge, usually using a gas generator (e.g. a small pyrotechnic charge or pressurized gas). The material then self-ignites in contact with air. The materials can be solid, e.g. iron platelets coated with ultrafine aluminium, or liquid, often organometallic compounds; e.g. alkyl aluminium compounds (e.g. triethylaluminium). Pyrophoric flares may have reduced effectiveness at high altitudes, due to lower air temperature and lower availability of oxygen; however oxygen can be co-ejected with the pyrophoric fuel.

The advantage of alkyl aluminium and similar compounds is the high content of carbon and hydrogen, resulting in bright emission lines similar to spectral signature of burning jet fuel. Controlled content of solid combustion products, generating continuous black-body radiation, allows further matching of emission characteristics to the net infrared emissions of fuel exhaust and hot engine components.

The flames of pyrophoric fuels can also reach the size of several metres, in comparison with about less than one metre flame of MTV flares. The trajectory can be also influenced by tailoring the aerodynamic properties of the ejected containers.

=== Highly flammable payloads ===
These payloads contain red phosphorus as an energetic filler. The red phosphorus is mixed with organic binders to give brushable pastes that can be coated on thin polyimide platelets. The combustion of those platelets yields a temperature-dependent signature. Endergonic additives such as highly dispersed silica or alkali halides may further lower the combustion temperature.

== See also ==
- Anti-aircraft
- Anti-ballistic missile
- Countermeasure
- Electronic countermeasure
