= HNE =

HNE may refer to:

- Hne, a Burmese musical instrument
- 4-Hydroxynonenal, produced by lipid peroxidation
- Chhattisgarhi language, spoken in India
- Hexanitroethane, an oxidizer
- Historic New England, an American historical society
- Home News Enterprises, an American publisher
- Michel Hne, New Caledonian football player
- Neutrophil elastase
- Harwich and North Essex, a UK Parliamentary Constituency
- Heure Normale de l'Est (Eastern time zone) in Canada.
