= Tetranitromethane =

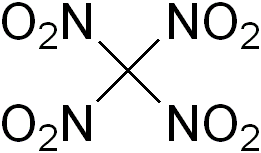

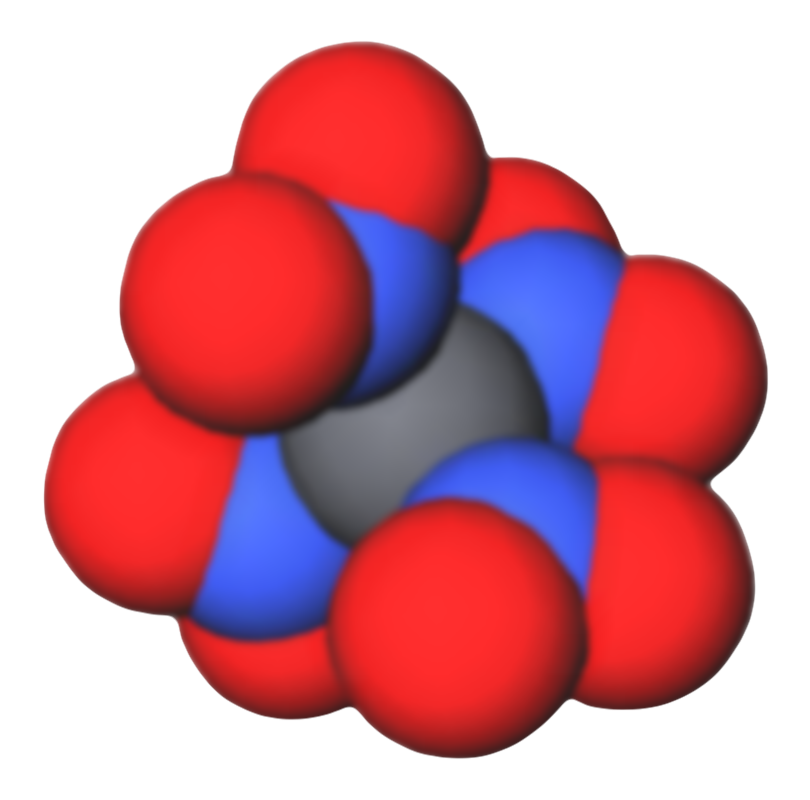

Names
- IUPAC name Tetranitromethane
- Other names TNM; Tetan

Identifiers
CAS Number	509-14-8
3D model (JSmol)	Interactive image
ChEMBL	ChEMBL261663
ChemSpider	13842838
ECHA InfoCard	100.007.359
EC Number	208-094-7
KEGG	C19300
PubChem CID	10509
RTECS number	PB4025000
UNII	K1G7CKU98F
UN number	1510
CompTox Dashboard (EPA)	DTXSID5021334
- InChI: InChI=1S/CN4O8/c6-2(7)1(3(8)9,4(10)11)5(12)13 Key: NYTOUQBROMCLBJ-UHFFFAOYSA-N; InChI=1/CN4O8/c6-2(7)1(3(8)9,4(10)11)5(12)13 Key: NYTOUQBROMCLBJ-UHFFFAOYAA
- SMILES: C([N+](=O)[O-])([N+](=O)[O-])([N+](=O)[O-])[N+](=O)[O-]

Properties
Chemical formula	C(NO_{2})_{4}
Molar mass	196.04 g/mol
Appearance	Colorless to pale-yellow liquid or solid
Odor	Pungent
Density	1.623 g/cm^{3}
Melting point	13.8 °C (56.8 °F; 286.9 K)
Boiling point	126 °C (259 °F; 399 K)
Solubility in water	insoluble
Vapor pressure	8 mmHg (20 °C)
Magnetic susceptibility (χ)	−43.02·10^{−6} cm^{3}/mol

Hazards
- Occupational safety and health (OHS/OSH)
Main hazards	Oxidant, can form explosive mixtures
- GHS labelling
Pictograms	(GHS02: Flammable) (GHS06: Toxic) (GHS07: Exclamation mark) (GHS08: Health hazard)
Signal word	Danger
Hazard statements	H271, H301, H315, H319, H330, H335, H351
Precautionary statements	P201, P202, P210, P220, P221, P260, P264, P270, P271, P280, P281, P283, P284, P301+P310, P302+P352, P304+P340, P305+P351+P338, P306+P360, P308+P313, P310, P312, P320, P321, P330, P332+P313, P337+P313, P362, P370+P378, P371+P380+P375, P403+P233, P405, P501
NFPA 704 (fire diamond)	3 1 2 OX
- Lethal dose or concentration (LD, LC)
LC_{50} (median concentration)	18 ppm (rat, 4 hr); 100 ppm (cat, 20 min); 54 ppm (mouse, 4 hr)
- NIOSH (US health exposure limits)
PEL (Permissible)	TWA 1 ppm (8 mg/m^{3})
REL (Recommended)	TWA 1 ppm (8 mg/m^{3})
IDLH (Immediate danger)	4 ppm
Safety data sheet (SDS)	ICSC 1468

Related compounds
Related compounds	Hexanitroethane; Octanitropentane; Trinitromethane
- Except where otherwise noted, data are given for materials in their standard state (at 25 °C [77 °F], 100 kPa). verify (what is ?) Infobox references

Tetranitromethane or TNM is an organic oxidizer with chemical formula C(NO_{2})_{4}. Its chemical structure consists of four nitro groups attached to one carbon atom. In 1857 it was first synthesised by the reaction of sodium cyanoacetamide with nitric acid.

== Uses ==
It has been investigated for use as an oxidizer in bipropellant rockets. Highly purified tetranitromethane cannot be made to explode, but its sensitivity is increased dramatically by oxidizable contaminants, such as anti-freezing additives. The pure substance also has too high a freezing point to remain reliably molten, although the eutectic with dinitrogen tetroxide freezes at the much lower −30 °C and is less explosive than nearly-pure tetranitromethane. Nevertheless, the oxidizer is still too sensitive for any effective use.

In the laboratory it is used as a reagent for the detection of double bonds in organic compounds and as a nitrating reagent. It has also found use as an additive to diesel fuel to increase the cetane number.

== Preparation ==
TNM is a pale yellow liquid that can be prepared in the laboratory by the nitration of acetic anhydride with anhydrous nitric acid (Chattaway's method). This method was attempted on an industrial scale in the 1950s by Nitroform Products Company in Newark, US, but the entire plant was destroyed by an explosion in 1953.

The first industrial scale production was started in Germany during World War II in an effort to improve the cetane number of diesel fuel. This process improved the original method, which started with acetic acid and nitric acid. Without regard to yield or cost, approximately 10 tons of TNM were produced in a few weeks. However, this production process has not been used again industrially after the end of the war, because of high associated costs.

For commercial use a cheaper method starting from acetylene has been used. First, nitric acid containing mercuric nitrate is reduced by acetylene, resulting in trinitromethane (nitroform) and a mixture of carbon dioxide and nitrogen oxide as waste gas. The nitrogen oxides are valuable and normally recovered as nitric acid in an absorption tower. The resulting nitroform is converted to TNM by adding nitric and sulfuric acid at higher temperatures. With this method a yield of 90% (based on nitric acid) before purification can be reached.

== Structure ==
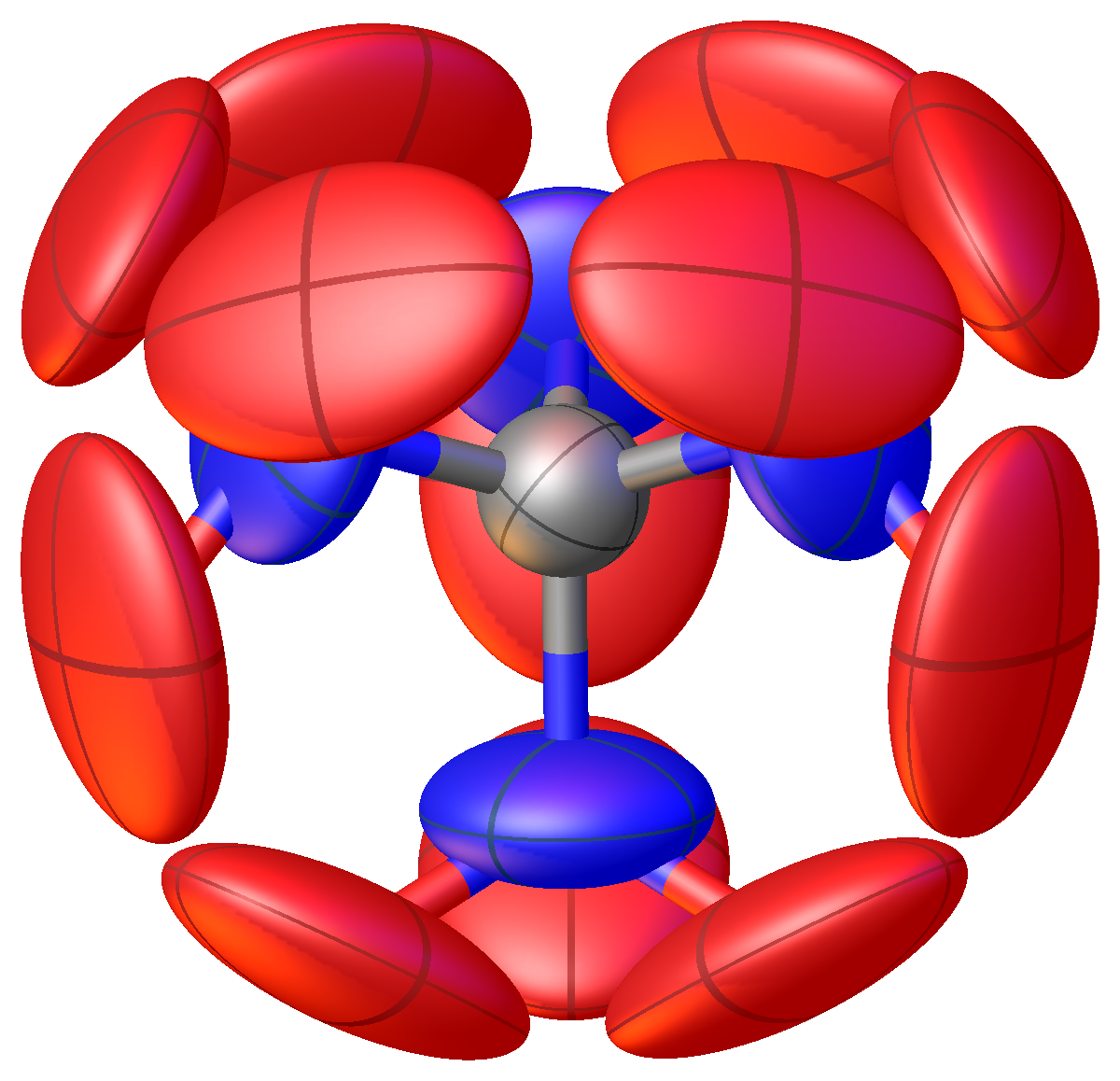
Figure 1: Disordered appearance of TNM molecules in the crystalline state

TNM is a prime example of molecular flexibility. It brought structural methods to the limits of their applicability as is shown by the fact that the structure of TNM was attempted to be determined for a period of more than 70 years in various phases.

Early investigations by gas electron diffractions were unable to describe the observed diffraction pattern in full and only the application of a four-dimensional model concerning the correlated movement of the four NO_{2} groups about the C–N bonds was able to describe the experimental observations fully. The problem occurs, because the two-fold local symmetry of the C−NO_{2} units versus the three-fold symmetry of the C(NO_{2})_{3} unit, as well as the close proximity of the NO_{2} groups hindering their free rotation, is the source for a very complicated mutually hindered movement of the NO_{2} groups.

The crystal structure has also been attempted several times. A first decent solution of the problem required a model describing a highly disordered high‐temperature crystalline phase of a high-temperature phase (>174.4 K) as is shown in Figure 1. Reduction of symmetry and analysis of the twinning of the crystals led finally to a resolved disorder of the structure shown in Figure 2.

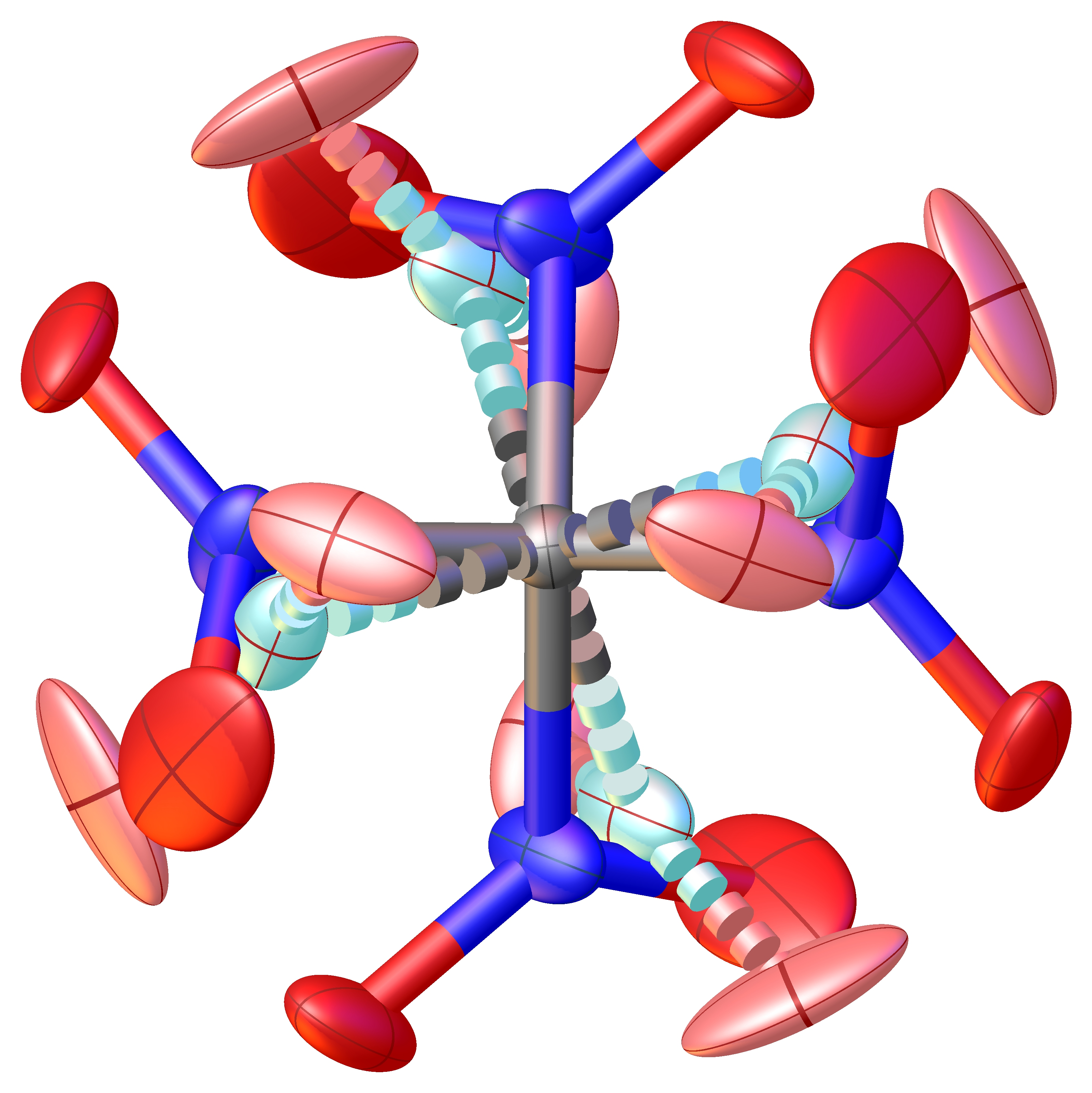
Figure 2: Resolved disorder of the high-temperature phase of TNM

The structure of an ordered low‐temperature phase contains three independent molecules in the asymmetric unit. Structural parameters of the gaseous and solid phases are listed in the following table for comparison.

Structural parameters of TNM determined by gas electron diffraction (GED) and single crystal X-ray diffraction (XRD). Distances are in Å angles in deg.
Parameter	GED	XRD (range)
rC–N	1.509(5)	1.502(4) – 1.554(5)
rN–O(eclip)	1.201(3)	1.198(4) – 1.215(5)
rN–O(stag)	1.199(3)	1.178(5) – 1.222(4)
∡NCN_1	105.1(16)	108.2(3) – 110.9(3)
∡NCN_2	111.7(8)	107.3(3) – 111.4(2)
∡NCN_3		106.6(2) – 107.1(3)
∡ONO	129.2(17)	128.0(4) – 132.3(4)

== Safety ==
The ability of TNM to detonate is greatly affected by the presence of impurities, even in small quantities. TNM forms extremely powerful explosive mixtures when fuels are added in stoichiometric proportions. Many of these mixtures show sensitivity to impact even higher than that of nitroglycerine.

Tetranitromethane can be used as a component of highly explosive liquid explosives as an oxidizing agent. It forms highly explosive mixtures with all flammable substances. When experimenting with this substance, paper filters should not be used for filtration. Even small impurities make tetranitromethane an explosive that explodes on impact or friction. A tragic lecture experiment at the University of Münster in 1920 is well known, where a small steel tube containing tetranitromethane, toluene and absorbent cotton detonated shortly before burning out in such a way that more than 30 students were injured, some seriously; however, on the basis of the rector's office records, as many as 10 deaths and more than a dozen injuries are documented. Thereupon the German Chemical-technical Reichsanstalt determined a detonation speed of 9300 meters per second. Alfred Stettbacher then proved comparatively that this mixture was far more explosive than hexogen, pentrite, blasting gelatine or panclastite and thus represented the most destructive explosive of all.

TNM reacts with moisture at elevated pH to produce trinitromethane (nitroform) which reacts easily with metals to form highly unstable and explosive salts.

Tetranitromethane is highly toxic. Absorption of as little as 2.5 mg/kg can cause methemoglobinemia, pulmonary edema, and damage to liver, kidney, and central nervous system. It is reasonably expected to be a human carcinogen.

== See also ==
- Hexanitroethane
- Trinitramide
