= Trinitromethane =

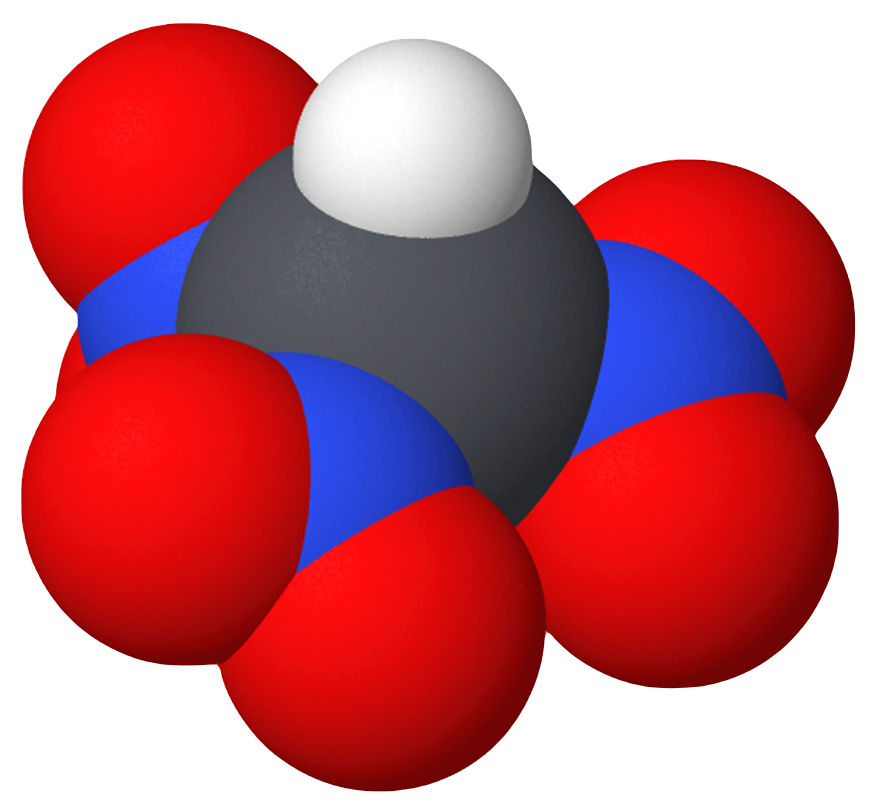

Names
- IUPAC name Trinitromethane
- Other names Nitroform

Identifiers
CAS Number	517-25-9
3D model (JSmol)	Interactive image; anion: Interactive image
ChemSpider	10157
ECHA InfoCard	100.007.489
EC Number	208-236-8
PubChem CID	10602; anion: 11355947
UNII	Q5IR4EM1R0
CompTox Dashboard (EPA)	DTXSID3060160
- InChI: InChI=1S/CHN3O6/c5-2(6)1(3(7)8)4(9)10/h1H Key: LZGVDNRJCGPNDS-UHFFFAOYSA-N; InChI=1/CHN3O6/c5-2(6)1(3(7)8)4(9)10/h1H; anion: InChI=1S/CN3O6/c5-2(6)1(3(7)8)4(9)10/q-1 Key: LVFFNJCUYJXEAZ-UHFFFAOYSA-N
- SMILES: C([N+](=O)[O-])([N+](=O)[O-])[N+](=O)[O-]; anion: C(=[N+]([O-])[O-])([N+](=O)[O-])[N+](=O)[O-]

Properties
Chemical formula	CHN_{3}O_{6}
Molar mass	151.04 g/mol
Appearance	Pale yellow crystals
Density	1.469 g/cm^{3}
Melting point	15 °C (59 °F; 288 K)
Solubility in water	44g/100ml at 20 °C
Acidity (pK_{a})	0.25 (see text)

Hazards
- Occupational safety and health (OHS/OSH)
Main hazards	Oxidant, Explosive (esp. in contact with metals), Corrosive.
NFPA 704 (fire diamond)	3 1 4 OX

Related compounds
Related compounds	Hexanitroethane; Octanitropentane; Tetranitromethane
- Except where otherwise noted, data are given for materials in their standard state (at 25 °C [77 °F], 100 kPa). verify (what is ?) Infobox references

Trinitromethane, also referred to as nitroform, is a nitroalkane and oxidizer with chemical formula HC(NO_{2})_{3}. It was first obtained in 1857 as the ammonium salt by the Russian chemist Leon Nikolaevich Shishkov (1830–1908). In 1900, it was discovered that nitroform can be produced by the reaction of acetylene with anhydrous nitric acid. This method went on to become the industrial process of choice during the 20th century. In the laboratory, nitroform can also be produced by hydrolysis of tetranitromethane under mild basic conditions.

== Acidity ==
Trinitromethane as a neutral molecule is colorless. It is highly acidic, easily forming an intensely yellow anion, (NO_{2})_{3}C^{−} (nitroformate). The pK_{a} of trinitromethane has been measured at 0.17 ± 0.02 at 20 °C, which is remarkably acidic for a methane derivative. Trinitromethane easily dissolves in water to form an acidic yellow solution.

There is some evidence that the anion, which obeys the 4n+2 Hückel rule, displays Y-aromaticity, a form of aromaticity disputed among chemists.

== Nitroform salts ==
Trinitromethane forms a series of bright yellow ionic salts. Many of these salts tend to be unstable and can be easily detonated by heat or impact.

The potassium salt of nitroform, KC(NO_{2})_{3} is a lemon yellow crystalline solid that decomposes slowly at room temperatures and explodes above 95 °C. The ammonium salt is somewhat more stable, and deflagrates or explodes above 200 °C. The hydrazine salt, hydrazinium nitroformate is thermally stable to above 125 °C and is being investigated as an ecologically friendly oxidizer for use in solid fuels for rockets.

== Condensation with formaldehyde ==
As found by British chemists Hurd and Starke during WWII, trinitromethane reacts with paraformaldehyde, giving trinitroethanol. This compound is a solvent to nitrocellulose and a precursor to high explosives such as trinitroethylorthoformate and trinitroethylorthocarbonate.
