= Nitrolysis =

RDX is a widely used explosive material that is produced by the nitrolysis reaction of hexamine.

Nitrolysis is a chemical reaction involving cleavage ("lysis") of a chemical bond concomitant with installation of a nitro group (NO_{2}). Typical reagents for effecting this conversion are nitric acid and acetyl nitrate. A commercially important nitrolysis reaction is the conversion of hexamine to nitramide. Nitrolysis of hexamine is also used to produce RDX, (O_{2}NNCH_{2})_{3}, a trinitramide widely used as an explosive.

== See also ==
- Nitration
- Nitramide
- Nitro compound
- Nitric acid
- RDX
- Chemical reaction
