= Nitramide =

Chemical compound (H2N–NO2)

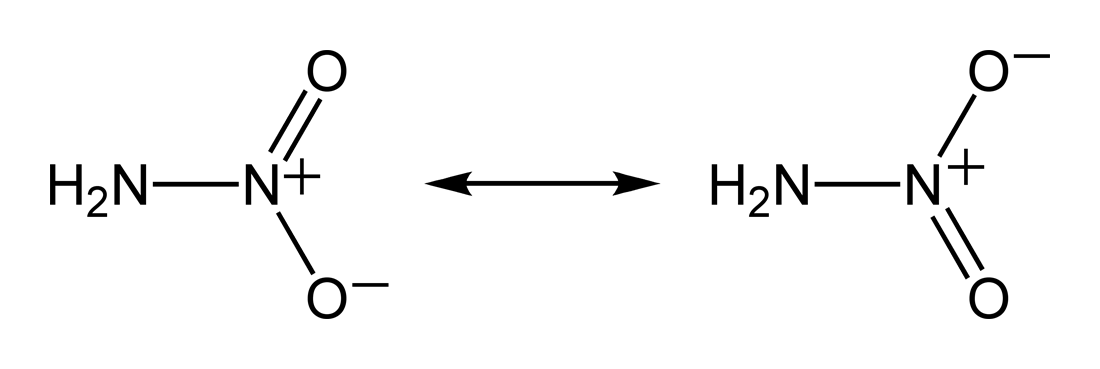

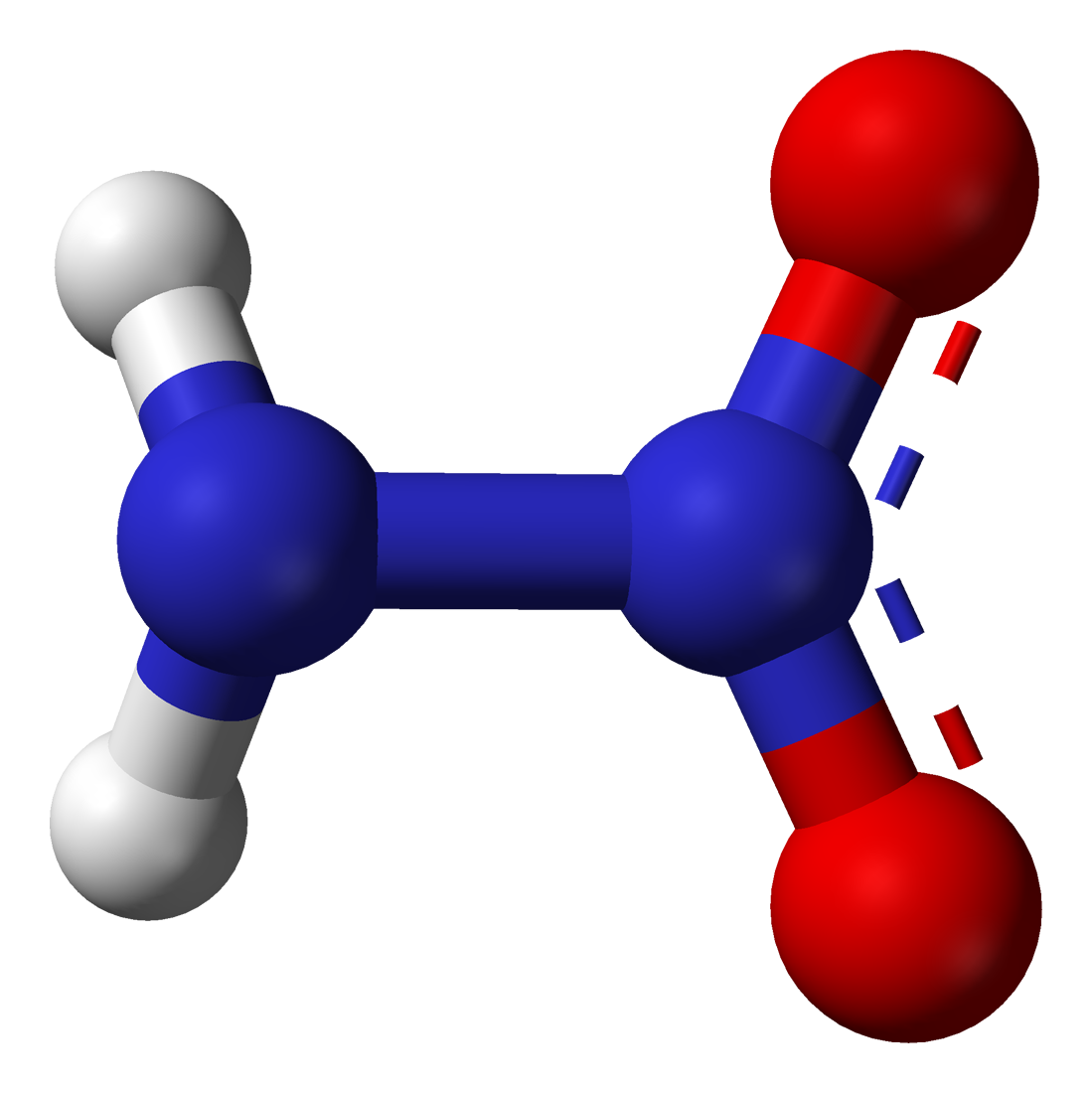
Nitrogen, N
Hydrogen, H
Oxygen, O
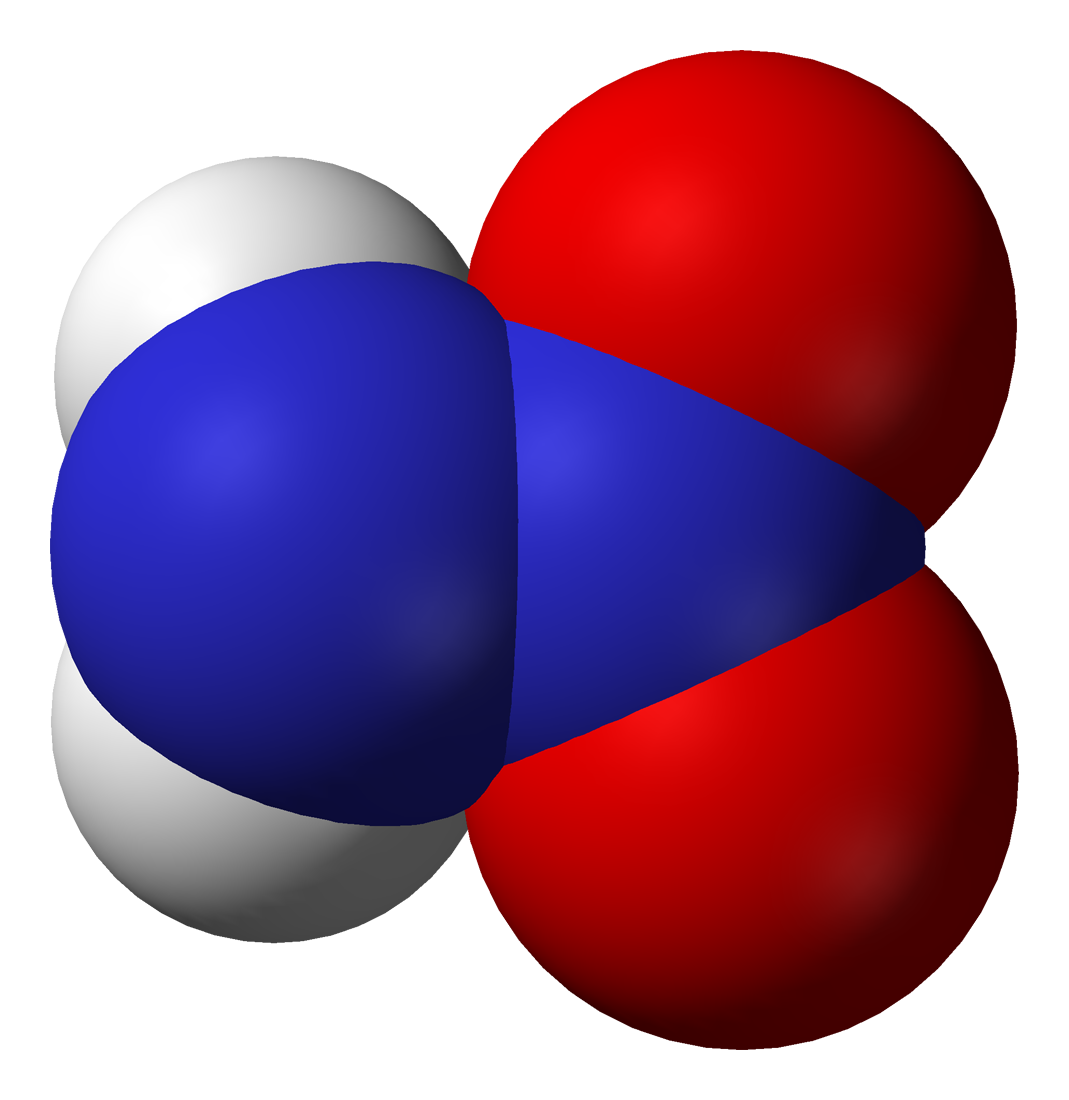

Names
- IUPAC name Nitramide
- Systematic IUPAC name Nitric amide
- Other names: Nitroamide; Nitramine; Nitroamine; Nitroammonia; Nitroazane

Identifiers
CAS Number	7782-94-7
3D model (JSmol)	Interactive image
ChEBI	CHEBI:29273
ChemSpider	22941
PubChem CID	24534
UNII	B8N6F7BJTL
CompTox Dashboard (EPA)	DTXSID20999028
- InChI: InChI=1S/H2N2O2/c1-2(3)4/h1H2 Key: SFDJOSRHYKHMOK-UHFFFAOYSA-N; InChI=1/H2N2O2/c1-2(3)4/h1H2 Key: SFDJOSRHYKHMOK-UHFFFAOYAT
- SMILES: N[N+](=O)[O-]

Properties
Chemical formula	H_{2}N−NO_{2}
Molar mass	62.028 g·mol^{−1}
Appearance	Colorless solid
Density	1.378 g/cm^{3}
Melting point	72 to 75 °C (162 to 167 °F; 345 to 348 K)
Acidity (pK_{a})	6.5

Related compounds
Related compounds	Ammonia; Dinitramide; Ammonium dinitramide; Trinitramide; Nitryl fluoride; Nitryl chloride; Nitryl bromide; Nitryl iodide; Nitric acid; Dinitrogen trioxide; Dinitrogen tetroxide; Dinitrogen pentoxide; Nitromethane; Hexamethylenetetramine; HMX
- Except where otherwise noted, data are given for materials in their standard state (at 25 °C [77 °F], 100 kPa). verify (what is ?) Infobox references

Nitramide or nitramine is a chemical compound with the molecular formula H_{2}N−NO_{2}. It is an isomer of hyponitrous acid. Nitramide can be viewed as a nitrogen analog of nitric acid (HO−NO_{2}), in which the hydroxyl group −OH is replaced with the amino group −NH_{2}.

Substituted derivatives R^{1}R^{2}N−NO_{2} are termed nitramides or nitroamines as well and see wide use as explosives: examples include RDX and HMX.

== Structure ==
The nitramide molecule is essentially an amine group (−NH_{2}) bonded to a nitro group (−NO_{2}). It is reported to be non-planar in the gas phase, but planar in the crystal phase.

== Synthesis ==
Thiele and Lachman's original synthesis of nitramide involved the hydrolysis of potassium nitrocarbamate:

(K^{+})_{2}(O_{2}N−N^{−}−CO^{−}_{2}) + 2 H_{2}SO_{4} → H_{2}N−NO_{2} + CO_{2} + 2 KHSO_{4}

Other routes to nitramide include hydrolysis of nitrocarbamic acid,

O_{2}N−NH−CO_{2}H → H_{2}N−NO_{2} + CO_{2}

reaction of sodium sulfamate with nitric acid,

Na(SO_{3}NH_{2}) + HNO_{3} → H_{2}N−NO_{2} + NaHSO_{4}

and reaction of dinitrogen pentoxide with two equivalents of ammonia.

N_{2}O_{5} + 2 NH_{3} → H_{2}N−NO_{2} + [NH_{4}]^{+}NO^{−}_{3}

== Organic nitramides ==
Also called nitramines, organic nitramides are important explosives. They are prepared by nitrolysis of hexamethylenetetramine.

The organic nitramide RDX is a widely used explosive.
