= Nitroamine =

Organic compounds of the form >N–NO2

Structure of the nitroamino group, >N−NO_{2}, here bonded to two R groups

In organic and inorganic chemistry, nitroamines or nitramides are chemical compounds with the general chemical structure R^{1}R^{2}N−NO_{2}. They consist of a nitro group (−NO_{2}) bonded to the nitrogen of an amine. The R groups can be any group, typically hydrogen (e.g., methylnitroamine CH_{3}−NH−NO_{2}) and organyl (e.g., diethylnitroamine (CH_{3}CH_{2}−)_{2}N−NO_{2}). An example of inorganic nitroamine is chloronitroamine, Cl−NH−NO_{2}. The parent inorganic compound, where both R substituents are hydrogen, is nitramide or nitroamine, H_{2}N−NO_{2}.

N-Nitroaniline rearranges in the presence of acid to give 2-nitroaniline.
