= Trinitroethylorthoformate =

Names
- Preferred IUPAC name 2-[Bis(2,2,2-trinitroethoxy)methoxy]-1,1,1-trinitroethane
- Other names: TNEOF

Identifiers
CAS Number	14548-59-5
3D model (JSmol)	Interactive image
ChemSpider	123273
PubChem CID	139780
CompTox Dashboard (EPA)	DTXSID80932613
- InChI: InChI=1S/C7H7N9O21/c17-8(18)5(9(19)20,10(21)22)1-35-4(36-2-6(11(23)24,12(25)26)13(27)28)37-3-7(14(29)30,15(31)32)16(33)34/h4H,1-3H2 Key: NWWHXKXUBVOXEX-UHFFFAOYSA-N
- SMILES: C(C([N+](=O)[O-])([N+](=O)[O-])[N+](=O)[O-])OC(OCC([N+](=O)[O-])([N+](=O)[O-])[N+](=O)[O-])OCC([N+](=O)[O-])([N+](=O)[O-])[N+](=O)[O-]

Properties
Chemical formula	C_{7}H_{7}N_{9}O_{21}
Molar mass	553.175 g·mol^{−1}
Appearance	Colorless crystals
Melting point	128 °C (262 °F; 401 K)
- Except where otherwise noted, data are given for materials in their standard state (at 25 °C [77 °F], 100 kPa). Infobox references

Trinitroethylorthoformate, also known as TNEOF, is an explosive with excellent chemical stability. It does not have hygroscopicity, does not dissolve in water, and does not react with acids. It decomposes in aqueous sodium hydroxide solution to release formaldehyde odor. The explosion point of TNEOF is 229 °C, though it begins to decompose at 190 °C. Its explosion heat is 6.3076 J/g and specific volume is 682 L/kg. Its structure is closely related to that of trinitroethylorthocarbonate (TNEOC). Both are highly explosive and very shock-sensitive, and may be dissolved in nitroalkanes to reduce their shock-sensitivity.

== Synthesis ==
Trinitroethanol is reacted with chloroform (CHCl_{3}) using iron trichloride (FeCl_{3}) as a catalyst:

3 (NO_{2})_{3}CCH_{2}OH + CHCl_{3} → TNEOF + 3 HCl
