= Trinitroethylorthocarbonate =

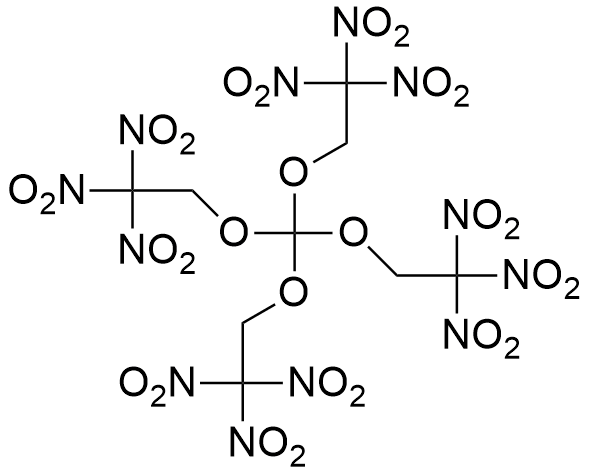

Names
- IUPAC name 2,2,2-Trinitroethyl orthocarbonate
- Preferred IUPAC name 1,1,1-Trinitro-2-[tris(2,2,2-trinitroethoxy)methoxy]ethane
- Other names: TNEOC

Identifiers
CAS Number	14548-58-4
3D model (JSmol)	Interactive image
ChemSpider	123272
PubChem CID	139779
- InChI: InChI=1S/C9H8N12O28/c22-10(23)5(11(24)25,12(26)27)1-46-9(47-2-6(13(28)29,14(30)31)15(32)33,48-3-7(16(34)35,17(36)37)18(38)39)49-4-8(19(40)41,20(42)43)21(44)45/h1-4H2 Key: JPTHXHQVODRICI-UHFFFAOYSA-N
- SMILES: C(C([N+](=O)[O-])([N+](=O)[O-])[N+](=O)[O-])OC(OCC([N+](=O)[O-])([N+](=O)[O-])[N+](=O)[O-])(OCC([N+](=O)[O-])([N+](=O)[O-])[N+](=O)[O-])OCC([N+](=O)[O-])([N+](=O)[O-])[N+](=O)[O-]

Properties
Chemical formula	C(OCH_{2}C(NO_{2})_{3})_{4}
Molar mass	732.219 g·mol^{−1}
Appearance	Colorless crystals
Melting point	161 °C (322 °F; 434 K)
- Except where otherwise noted, data are given for materials in their standard state (at 25 °C [77 °F], 100 kPa). Infobox references

Trinitroethylorthocarbonate, also known as TNEOC, is an organic compound with the chemical formula C(OCH_{2}C(NO_{2})_{3})_{4}. It is an oxidizer with excellent chemical stability. Its explosion point is 238 °C, and it begins to be decomposed at 200 °C. Its explosion heat is 5.797 J/g and specific volume is 694 L/kg. Its structure is closely related to that of trinitroethylorthoformate (TNEOF). Both are highly explosive and very shock-sensitive, and may be dissolved in nitroalkanes to reduce their shock-sensitivity.

== Synthesis ==
TNEOC can be prepared by the reaction of trinitroethanol with carbon tetrachloride, catalyzed by FeCl_{3}:

4 HOCH_{2}C(NO_{2})_{3} + CCl_{4} → TNEOC + 4 HCl
