= RDX =

Explosive chemical compound

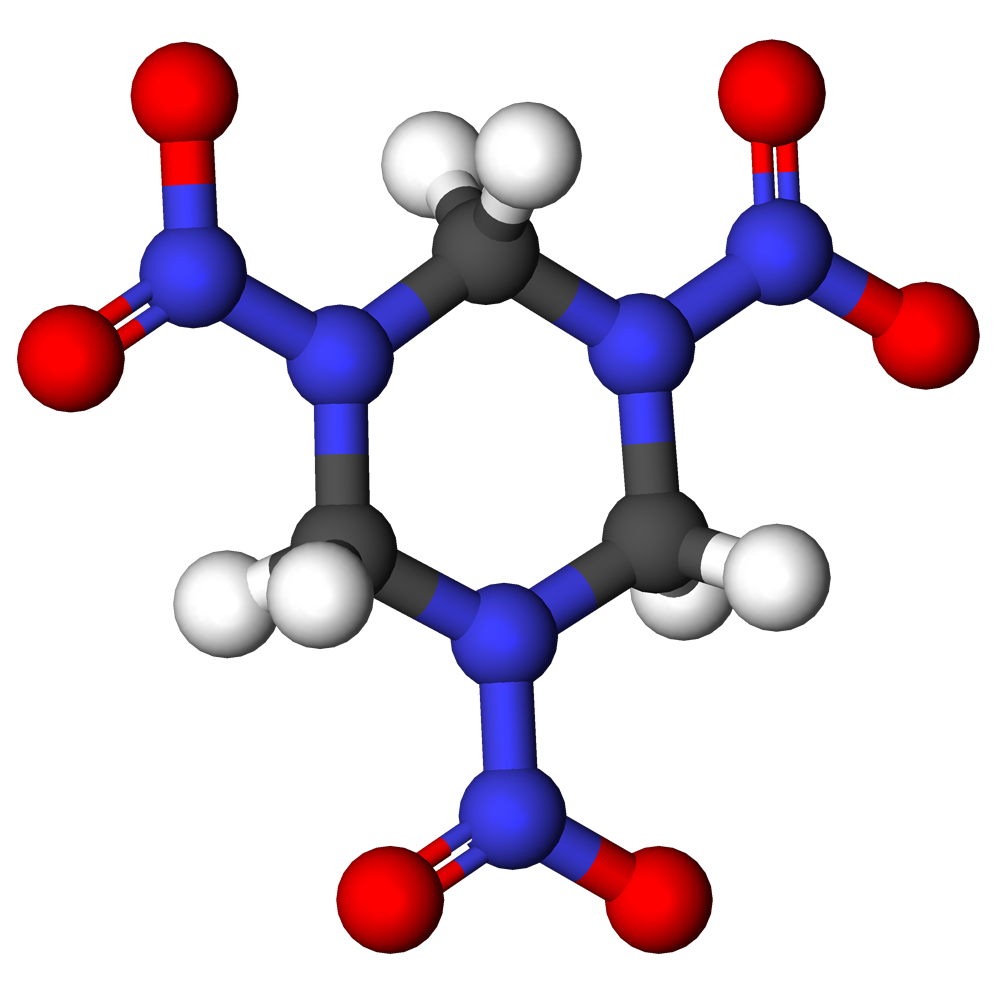

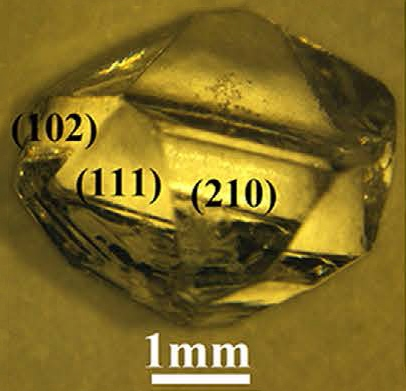
- RDX crystal

Names
- Preferred IUPAC name 1,3,5-Trinitro-1,3,5-triazinane
- Other names: 1,3,5-Trinitroperhydro-1,3,5-triazine; RDX; cyclonite, hexogen; 1,3,5-Trinitro-1,3,5-triazacyclohexane; 1,3,5-Trinitrohexahydro-s-triazine; Cyclotrimethylenetrinitramine; Hexahydro-1,3,5-trinitro-s-triazine; Trimethylenetrinitramine; hexolite

Identifiers
CAS Number	121-82-4
3D model (JSmol)	Interactive image
ChEBI	CHEBI:24556
ChemSpider	8177
ECHA InfoCard	100.004.092
PubChem CID	8490
UNII	W91SSV5831
UN number	0072, 0391, 0483
CompTox Dashboard (EPA)	DTXSID9024142
- InChI: InChI=1S/C3H6N6O6/c10-7(11)4-1-5(8(12)13)3-6(2-4)9(14)15/h1-3H2 Key: XTFIVUDBNACUBN-UHFFFAOYSA-N; InChI=1/C3H6N6O6/c10-7(11)4-1-5(8(12)13)3-6(2-4)9(14)15/h1-3H2 Key: XTFIVUDBNACUBN-UHFFFAOYAY
- SMILES: C1N(CN(CN1[N+](=O)[O-])[N+](=O)[O-])[N+](=O)[O-]

Properties
Chemical formula	C_{3}H_{6}N_{6}O_{6}
Molar mass	222.117 g·mol^{−1}
Appearance	Colorless or yellowish crystals
Density	1.806 g/cm^{3}
Melting point	205.5 °C (401.9 °F; 478.6 K)
Boiling point	234 °C (453 °F; 507 K)
Solubility in water	insoluble

Explosive data
Shock sensitivity	Low
Friction sensitivity	Low
Detonation velocity	8750 m/s
RE factor	1.60

Hazards
- Occupational safety and health (OHS/OSH)
Main hazards	Explosive, detonates on contact with mercury fulminate, highly toxic
- GHS labelling
Pictograms	(GHS01: Explosive) (GHS06: Toxic)
Signal word	Danger
Hazard statements	H201, H301, H370, H373
Precautionary statements	P210, P250, P280, P370, P372, P373, P501
NFPA 704 (fire diamond)	3 1 4
Flash point	Explosive
- Lethal dose or concentration (LD, LC)
LD_{50} (median dose)	100 mg/kg
- NIOSH (US health exposure limits)
PEL (Permissible)	none
REL (Recommended)	TWA 1.5 mg/m^{3} ST 3 mg/m^{3} [skin]
IDLH (Immediate danger)	N.D.
- Except where otherwise noted, data are given for materials in their standard state (at 25 °C [77 °F], 100 kPa). verify (what is ?) Infobox references

RDX (Research Department Explosive or Royal Demolition Explosive), or hexogen, also known by other names, is an organic compound with the formula (CH_{2}N_{2}O_{2})_{3}. It is white, odorless, tasteless, and widely used as an explosive. Chemically, it is classified as a nitroamine alongside HMX. It was used widely in World War II and remains common in military applications. It is lower performing and more toxic than modern replacements like TKX-50.

RDX is often used in mixtures with other explosives and plasticizers or phlegmatizers (desensitizers); it is the explosive agent in C-4 plastic explosive and a key ingredient in Semtex. It is stable in storage and is considered one of the most energetic and brisant of the military high explosives, with a relative effectiveness factor of 1.60.

== Name ==
RDX is also less commonly known as cyclonite, hexogen (particularly in Russian, French and German-influenced languages), T4, and, chemically, as cyclotrimethylene trinitramine. In the 1930s, the Royal Arsenal, Woolwich, started investigating cyclonite to use against German U-boats that were being built with thicker hulls. The goal was to develop an explosive more energetic than TNT. For security reasons, Britain termed cyclonite "Research Department Explosive" (R.D.X.). The term RDX appeared in the United States in 1946. The first public reference in the United Kingdom to the name R.D.X. appeared in 1948; its authors were: the Managing Chemist, ROF Bridgwater; the Chemical Research and Development Department, Woolwich; and the Director of Royal Ordnance Factories, Explosives.

== Usage ==
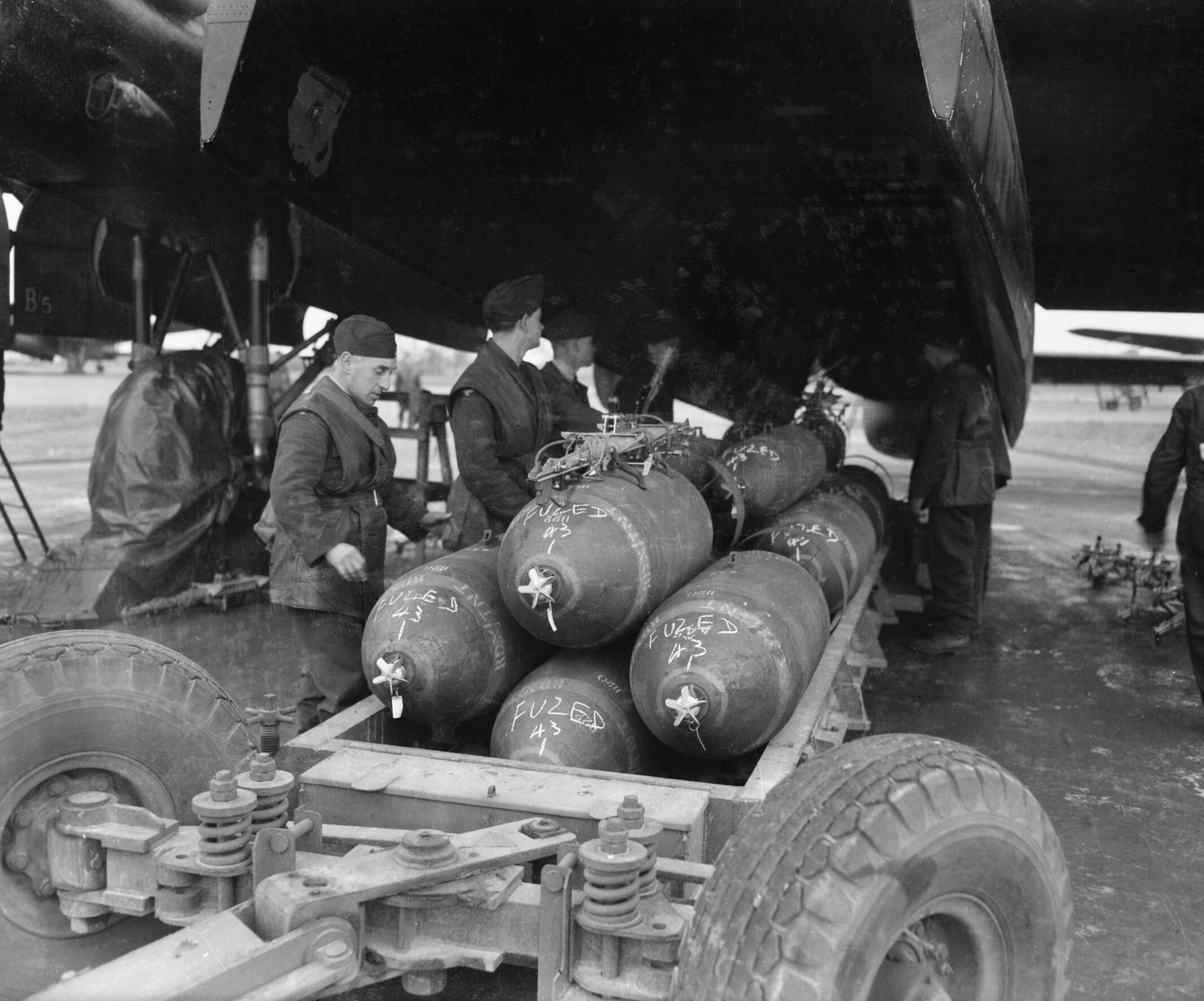
Armourers prepare to load 1,000 lb (450 kg) medium capacity bombs into the bomb-bay of an Avro Lancaster B Mark III of No. 106 Squadron RAF at RAF Metheringham before a major night raid on Frankfurt. The stencilled lettering around the circumference of each bomb reads "RDX/TNT".

RDX was widely used during World War II, often in explosive mixtures with TNT such as Torpex, Composition B, Cyclotol, and H-6. RDX was used in one of the first plastic explosives. The bouncing bomb depth charges used in the "Dambusters Raid" each contained 6,600 pounds (3,000 kg) of Torpex. The Tallboy and Grand Slam bombs designed by Barnes Wallis also used Torpex.

RDX is believed to have been used in many bomb plots, including terrorist plots.

RDX is the base for a number of common military explosives:

- Composition A: Granular explosive consisting of RDX and plasticizing wax, such as composition A-3 (91% RDX coated with 9% wax) and composition A-5 (98.5 to 99.1% RDX coated with 0.95 to 1.54% stearic acid).
- Composition B: Castable mixtures of 59.5% RDX and 39.4% TNT with 1% wax as desensitizer.
- Composition C: The original composition C was used in World War II, but there have been subsequent variations including C-2, C-3, and C-4. C-4 consists of RDX (91%); a plasticizer, dioctyl sebacate (5.3%); and a binder, which is usually polyisobutylene (2.1%); and a specially manufactured mineral oil (1.6%).
- Composition CH-6: 97.5% RDX, 1.5% calcium stearate, 0.5% polyisobutylene, and 0.5% graphite
- DBX (Depth Bomb Explosive): Castable mixture consisting of 21% RDX, 21% ammonium nitrate, 40% TNT, and 18% powdered aluminium, developed during World War II, it was to be used in underwater munitions as a substitute for Torpex employing only half the amount of then-scarce RDX, as the supply of RDX became more adequate, however, the mixture was shelved
- Cyclotol: Castable mixture of RDX (50–80%) with TNT (20–50%) designated by the amount of RDX/TNT, such as Cyclotol 70/30
- HBX: Castable mixtures of RDX, TNT, powdered aluminium, and D-2 wax with calcium chloride
- H-6: Castable mixture of RDX, TNT, powdered aluminum, and paraffin wax (used as a phlegmatizing agent)
- PBX: RDX is also used as a major component of many polymer-bonded explosives (PBX); RDX-based PBXs typically consist of RDX and at least thirteen different polymer/co-polymer binders. Examples of RDX-based PBX formulations include, but are not limited to: PBX-9007, PBX-9010, PBX-9205, PBX-9407, PBX-9604, PBXN-106, PBXN-3, PBXN-6, PBXN-10, PBXN-201, PBX-0280, PBX Type I, PBXC-116, PBXAF-108, etc.
- Semtex (trade name): Plastic demolition explosive containing RDX and PETN as major energetic components
- Torpex: 42% RDX, 40% TNT, and 18% powdered aluminium; the mixture was designed during World War II and used mainly in underwater ordnance

Outside military applications, RDX is also used in controlled demolition to raze structures. The demolition of the Jamestown Bridge in the U.S. state of Rhode Island was one instance where RDX shaped charges were used to remove the span.

== Synthesis ==
RDX is classified by chemists as a hexahydro-1,3,5-triazine derivative. In laboratory settings (industrial routes are described below separately) it is obtained by treating hexamine with white fuming nitric acid.

This nitrolysis reaction also produces methylene dinitrate, ammonium nitrate, and water as by-products. The overall reaction is:

C_{6}H_{12}N_{4} + 10 HNO_{3} → C_{3}H_{6}N_{6}O_{6} + 3 CH_{2}(ONO_{2})_{2} + NH_{4}NO_{3} + 3 H_{2}O

Careful control of the acid mixture is necessary, as similar conditions produce a wide variety of partial deamination products. Indeed, the conventional cheap nitration agent, called "mixed acid", cannot be used for RDX synthesis because concentrated sulfuric acid used to stimulate the nitronium ion formation is too strong, decomposing hexamine into formaldehyde and ammonia.

Modern syntheses employ hexahydro-triacyl-triazine, as it avoids formation of HMX.

== History ==
RDX was used by both sides in World War II. The US produced about 15,000 long tons (15,000 t) per month during WWII and Germany about 7,100 tonnes (7,000 long tons) per month. RDX had the major advantages of possessing greater explosive force than TNT and required no additional raw materials for its manufacture. Thus, it was also extensively used in World War II.

=== Germany ===
RDX was reported in 1898 by Georg Friedrich Henning (1863-1945), who obtained a German patent for its manufacture by nitrolysis of hexamine (hexamethylenetetramine) with concentrated nitric acid. In this patent, only the medical properties of RDX were mentioned.

During WWI, Heinrich Brunswig (1865-1946) at the private military-industrial laboratory Zentralstelle für wissenschaftlich-technische Untersuchungen (Center for Scientific-Technical Research) in Neubabelsberg studied the compound more closely and in June 1916 filed two patent applications, one for its use in smokeless propellants and another for its use as an explosive, noting its excellent characteristics. The German military hadn't considered its adoption during the war due to the expense of production but started investigating its use in 1920, referring to it as hexogen.

Research and development findings were not published further until Edmund von Herz, described as an Austrian and later a German citizen, rediscovered the explosive properties of RDX and applied for an Austrian patent in 1919, obtaining a British one in 1921 and an American one in 1922. All patents described the synthesis of the compound by nitrating hexamethylenetetramine. The British patent claims included the manufacture of RDX by nitration, its use with or without other explosives, its use as a bursting charge and as an initiator. The US patent claim was for the use of a hollow explosive device containing RDX and a detonator cap containing it. Herz was also the first to identify the cyclic nature of the molecule.

In the 1930s, Germany developed improved production methods.

During World War II, Germany used the code names W Salt, SH Salt, K-method, the E-method, and the KA-method. These names represented the identities of the developers of the various chemical routes to RDX. The W-method was developed by Wolfram in 1934 and gave RDX the code name "W-Salz". It used sulfamic acid, formaldehyde, and nitric acid. SH-Salz (SH salt) was from Schnurr, who developed a batch-process in 1937–38 based on nitrolysis of hexamine. The K-method, from Knöffler, involved addition of ammonium nitrate to the hexamine/nitric acid process. The E-method, developed by Ebele, proved to be identical to the Ross and Schiessler process described below. The KA-method, also developed by Knöffler, turned out to be identical to the Bachmann process described below.

The explosive shells fired by the MK 108 cannon and the warhead of the R4M rocket, both used in Luftwaffe fighter aircraft as offensive armament, both used hexogen as their explosive base.

=== UK ===
In the United Kingdom, RDX was manufactured from 1933 by the research department in a pilot plant at the Royal Arsenal in Woolwich, London, a larger pilot plant being built at the RGPF Waltham Abbey just outside London in 1939. In 1939 a twin-unit industrial-scale plant was designed to be installed at a new 700-acre (280 ha) site, ROF Bridgwater, away from London and production of RDX started at Bridgwater on one unit in August 1941. The ROF Bridgwater plant brought in ammonia and methanol as raw materials: the methanol was converted to formaldehyde and some of the ammonia converted to nitric acid, which was concentrated for RDX production. The rest of the ammonia was reacted with formaldehyde to produce hexamine. The hexamine plant was supplied by Imperial Chemical Industries. It incorporated some features based on data obtained from the United States (US). RDX was produced by continually adding hexamine and concentrated nitric acid to a cooled mixture of hexamine and nitric acid in the nitrator. The RDX was purified and processed for its intended use; recovery and reuse of some methanol and nitric acid also was carried out. The hexamine-nitration and RDX purification plants were duplicated (i.e. twin-unit) to provide some insurance against loss of production due to fire, explosion, or air attack.

The United Kingdom and British Empire were fighting without allies against Nazi Germany until the middle of 1941 and had to be self-sufficient. At that time (1941), the UK had the capacity to produce 70 long tons (71 t) (160,000 lb) of RDX per week; both Canada, an allied country and self-governing dominion within the British Empire, and the US were looked upon to supply ammunition and explosives, including RDX. By 1942, the Royal Air Force's annual requirement was forecast to be 52,000 long tons (53,000 t) of RDX, much of which came from North America (Canada and the US).

=== Canada ===
A different method of production to the Woolwich process was found and used in Canada, possibly at the McGill University department of chemistry. This was based on reacting paraformaldehyde and ammonium nitrate in acetic anhydride. A UK patent application was made by Robert Walter Schiessler (Pennsylvania State University) and James Hamilton Ross (McGill, Canada) in May 1942; the UK patent was issued in December 1947. Gilman states that the same method of production had been independently discovered by Ebele in Germany prior to Schiessler and Ross, but that this was not known by the Allies. Urbański provides details of five methods of production, and he refers to this method as the (German) E-method.

=== UK, US and Canadian production and development ===
At the beginning of the 1940s, the major US explosive manufacturers, E. I. du Pont de Nemours & Company and Hercules, had several decades of experience of manufacturing TNT and had no wish to experiment with new explosives. US Army Ordnance held the same viewpoint and wanted to continue using TNT. RDX had been tested by Picatinny Arsenal in 1929, and it was regarded as too expensive and too sensitive. The Navy proposed to continue using ammonium picrate. In contrast, the National Defense Research Committee (NDRC), who had visited The Royal Arsenal, Woolwich, thought new explosives were necessary. James B. Conant, chairman of Division B, wished to involve academic research into this area. Conant therefore set up an experimental explosives research laboratory at the Bureau of Mines, Bruceton, Pennsylvania, using Office of Scientific Research and Development (OSRD) funding.

==== Woolwich method ====
In 1941, the UK's Tizard Mission visited the US Army and Navy departments and part of the information handed over included details of the "Woolwich" method of manufacture of RDX and its stabilisation by mixing it with beeswax. The UK was asking that the US and Canada, combined, supply 220 short tons (200 t) (440,000 lb) of RDX per day. A decision was taken by William H. P. Blandy, chief of the Bureau of Ordnance, to adopt RDX for use in mines and torpedoes. Given the immediate need for RDX, the US Army Ordnance, at Blandy's request, built a plant that copied the equipment and process used at Woolwich. The result was the Wabash River Ordnance Works run by E. I. du Pont de Nemours & Company. At that time, this works had the largest nitric acid plant in the world. The Woolwich process was expensive: it needed 11 pounds (5.0 kg) of strong nitric acid for every pound of RDX produced.

By early 1941, the NDRC was researching new processes. The Woolwich or direct nitration process has at least two serious disadvantages: (1) it used large amounts of nitric acid and (2) at least one-half of the formaldehyde is lost. One mole of hexamethylenetetramine could produce at most one mole of RDX. At least three laboratories with no previous explosive experience were instructed to develop better production methods for RDX; they were based at Cornell, Michigan, and Pennsylvania State universities. (Note: These were not the only laboratories to work on RDX, Gilman's 1953 account of the Ross–Schiessler method was based on unpublished work from laboratories at the Universities of Michigan, Pennsylvania, Cornell, Harvard, Vanderbilt, McGill (Canada), Bristol (UK), Sheffield (UK), Pennsylvania State College, and the UK's research department.) Werner Emmanuel Bachmann, from Michigan, successfully developed the "combination process" by combining the Ross and Schiessler process used in Canada (aka the German E-method) with direct nitration. The combination process required large quantities of acetic anhydride instead of nitric acid in the old British "Woolwich process". Ideally, the combination process could produce two moles of RDX from each mole of hexamethylenetetramine.

The expanded production of RDX could not continue to rely on the use of natural beeswax to desensitize the explosive as in the original British composition (RDX/BWK-91/9). A substitute stabilizer based on petroleum was developed at the Bruceton Explosives Research Laboratory in Pennsylvania, with the resulting explosive designated Composition A-3.

==== Bachmann process ====
The National Defence Research Committee (NDRC) instructed three companies to develop pilot plants. They were the Western Cartridge Company, E. I. du Pont de Nemours & Company, and Tennessee Eastman Company, part of Eastman Kodak. At the Eastman Chemical Company (TEC), a leading manufacturer of acetic anhydride, Werner Emmanuel Bachmann developed a continuous-flow process for RDX utilizing an ammonium nitrate/nitric acid mixture as a nitrating agent in a medium of acetic acid and acetic anhydride. RDX was crucial to the war effort and the current batch-production process was too slow. In February 1942, TEC began producing small amounts of RDX at its Wexler Bend pilot plant, which led to the US government authorizing TEC to design and build Holston Ordnance Works (H.O.W.) in June 1942. By April 1943, RDX was being manufactured there. At the end of 1944, the Holston plant and the Wabash River Ordnance Works, which used the Woolwich process, were producing 25,000 short tons (23,000 t) (50 million pounds) of Composition B per month.

The Bachmann process yields both RDX and HMX, with the major product determined by the specific reaction conditions.

=== Military compositions ===
The United Kingdom's intention in World War II was to use "desensitised" RDX. In the original Woolwich process, RDX was phlegmatized with beeswax, but later paraffin wax was used, based on the work carried out at Bruceton. In the event the UK was unable to obtain sufficient RDX to meet its needs, some of the shortfall was met by substituting amatol, a mixture of ammonium nitrate and TNT.

Karl Dönitz was reputed to have claimed that "an aircraft can no more kill a U-boat than a crow can kill a mole". Nonetheless, by May 1942 Wellington bombers began to deploy depth charges containing Torpex, a mixture of RDX, TNT, and aluminium, which had up to 50 percent more destructive power than TNT-filled depth charges. Considerable quantities of the RDX–TNT mixture were produced at the Holston Ordnance Works, with Tennessee Eastman developing an automated mixing and cooling process based around the use of stainless steel conveyor belts.

=== Terrorism ===
A Semtex bomb was used in the Pan Am Flight 103 (known also as the Lockerbie) bombing in 1988. A belt laden with 700 g (1.5 lb) of RDX explosives tucked under the dress of the assassin was used in the assassination of former Indian prime minister Rajiv Gandhi in 1991. The 1993 Bombay bombings used RDX placed into several vehicles as bombs. RDX was the main component used for the 2006 Mumbai train bombings and the Jaipur bombings in 2008. It also is believed to be the explosive used in the 2010 Moscow Metro bombings.

Traces of RDX were found on pieces of wreckage from 1999 Russian apartment bombings and 2004 Russian aircraft bombings. FSB reports on the bombs used in the 1999 apartment bombings indicated that while RDX was not a part of the main charge, each bomb contained plastic explosive used as a booster charge.

Ahmed Ressam, the al-Qaeda Millennium Bomber, used a small quantity of RDX as one of the components in the bomb that he prepared to detonate in Los Angeles International Airport on New Year's Eve 1999–2000; the bomb could have produced a blast forty times greater than that of a devastating car bomb.

In July 2012, the Kenyan government arrested two Iranian nationals and charged them with illegal possession of 15 kilograms (33 pounds) of RDX. According to the Kenyan Police, the Iranians planned to use the RDX for "attacks on Israeli, US, UK and Saudi Arabian targets".

RDX was used in the assassination of Lebanese Prime Minister Rafic Hariri on February 14, 2005.

In the 2019 Pulwama attack in India, 250 kg of high-grade RDX was used by Jaish-e-Mohammed. The attack resulted in the deaths of 44 Central Reserve Police Force (CRPF) personnel as well as the attacker.

Two letter bombs sent to journalists in Ecuador were disguised as USB flash drives which contained RDX that would detonate when plugged in.

== Stability ==
RDX has a high nitrogen content and a high oxygen to carbon ratio, (O:C ratio), both of which indicate its explosive potential for formation of N_{2} and CO_{2}.

RDX undergoes a deflagration to detonation transition (DDT) in confinement and certain circumstances.

The velocity of detonation of RDX at a density of 1.80 g/cm^{3} is 8750 m/s.

It starts to decompose at approximately 170 °C and melts at 204 °C. At room temperature, it is very stable. It burns rather than explodes. It detonates only with a detonator, and is unaffected even by small arms fire. This property makes it a useful military explosive. It is less sensitive than pentaerythritol tetranitrate (PETN). Under normal conditions, RDX has a Figure of Insensitivity of exactly 80 (RDX defines this reference point).

RDX sublimes in vacuum, which restricts or prevents its use in some applications.

RDX, when exploded in air, has about 1.5 times the explosive energy of TNT per unit weight and about 2.0 times per unit volume.

RDX is insoluble in water, with solubility 0.05975 g/L at temperature of 25 °C.

== Toxicity ==
The substance's toxicity has been studied for many years. RDX has caused convulsions (seizures) in military field personnel ingesting it, and in munition workers inhaling its dust during manufacture. At least one fatality was attributed to RDX toxicity in a European munitions manufacturing plant.

During the Vietnam War, at least 40 American soldiers were hospitalized with composition C-4 (which is 91% RDX) intoxication from December 1968 to December 1969. C-4 was frequently used by soldiers as a fuel to heat food, and the food was generally mixed by the same knife that was used to cut C-4 into small pieces prior to burning. Soldiers were exposed to C-4 either due to inhaling the fumes, or due to ingestion, made possible by many small particles adhering to the knife having been deposited into the cooked food. The symptom complex involved nausea, vomiting, generalized seizures, and prolonged postictal confusion and amnesia; which indicated toxic encephalopathy.

Oral toxicity of RDX depends on its physical form; in rats, the LD50 was found to be 100 mg/kg for finely powdered RDX, and 300 mg/kg for coarse, granular RDX. A case has been reported of a human child hospitalized in status epilepticus following the ingestion of 84.82 mg/kg dose of RDX (or 1.23 g for the patient's body weight of 14.5 kg) in the "plastic explosive" form.

The substance has low to moderate toxicity with a possible human carcinogen classification. Further research is ongoing, however, and this classification may be revised by the United States Environmental Protection Agency (EPA). Remediating RDX-contaminated water supplies has proven to be successful. It is known to be a kidney toxin in humans and highly toxic to earthworms and plants, thus army testing ranges where RDX was used heavily may need to undergo environmental remediation. Concerns have been raised by research published in late 2017 indicating that the issue has not been addressed correctly by U.S. officials.

== Civilian use ==
RDX has been used as a rodenticide because of its toxicity.

== Biodegradation ==
RDX is degraded by the organisms in sewage sludge as well as the fungus Phanaerocheate chrysosporium. Both wild and transgenic plants can phytoremediate explosives from soil and water. One by-product of the environmental decomposition is R-salt.

== Alternatives ==
The Insensitive high explosive FOX-7 is considered to be approximately a 1-to-1 replacement for RDX in almost all applications. TKX-50 is considered to be a high-performance replacement.

== Bibliography ==
- Baxter III, James Phinney (1968) [1946], Scientists Against Time (MIT Paperback ed.), Cambridge, MA: MIT Press, ISBN 978-0-262-52012-6, OCLC 476611116
- Elderfield, Robert C. (1960), Werner Emanual Bachmann: 1901–1951 (PDF), Washington DC: National Academy of Sciences, archived (PDF) from the original on June 17, 2011
- MacDonald and Mack Partnership (August 1984), Final Properties Report: Newport Army Ammunition Plant (PDF), National Park Service, AD-A175 818, archived from the original (PDF) on April 29, 2011
- Urbański, Tadeusz (1967), Laverton, Silvia (ed.), Chemistry and Technology of Explosives, vol. III, translated by Jureck, Marian (First English ed.), Warszawa: PWN – Polish Scientific Publishers and Pergamon Press, OCLC 499857211. See also ISBN 978-0-08-010401-0.
- Urbański translation openlibrary.org, Macmillan, NY, 1964, ISBN 0-08-026206-6.
