= Hexanitroethane =

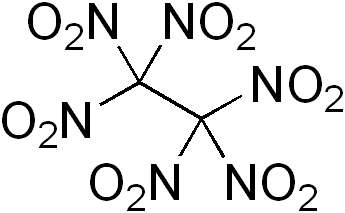

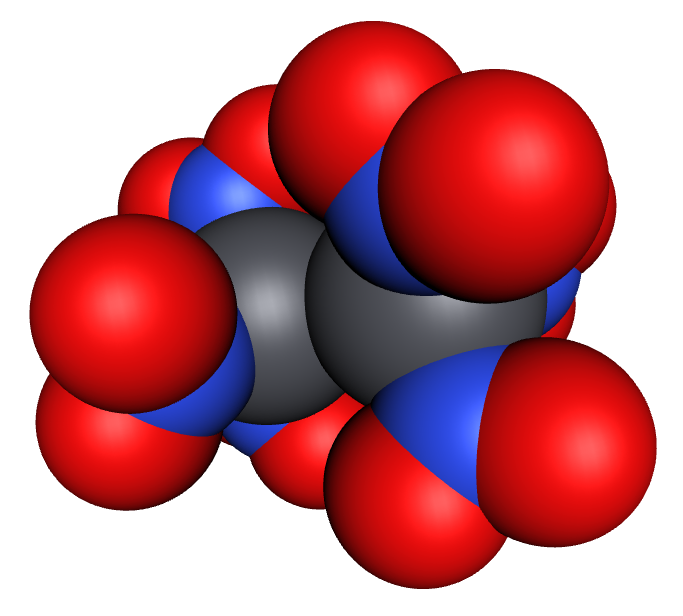

Names
- Preferred IUPAC name Hexanitroethane

Identifiers
CAS Number	918-37-6
3D model (JSmol)	Interactive image
Abbreviations	HNE
ChemSpider	55174
ECHA InfoCard	100.011.857
EC Number	213-042-1
PubChem CID	61232
CompTox Dashboard (EPA)	DTXSID2061278
- InChI: InChI=1S/C2N6O12/c9-3(10)1(4(11)12,5(13)14)2(6(15)16,7(17)18)8(19)20 Key: CCAKQXWHJIKAST-UHFFFAOYSA-N; InChI=1/C2N6O12/c9-3(10)1(4(11)12,5(13)14)2(6(15)16,7(17)18)8(19)20 Key: CCAKQXWHJIKAST-UHFFFAOYAX
- SMILES: C(C([N+](=O)[O-])([N+](=O)[O-])[N+](=O)[O-])([N+](=O)[O-])([N+](=O)[O-])[N+](=O)[O-]

Properties
Chemical formula	C_{2}N_{6}O_{12}
Molar mass	300.052 g·mol^{−1}
Melting point	135 °C (275 °F; 408 K)

Related compounds
Related compounds	Nitroethane; Tetranitromethane; Trinitromethane; Hexanitrobenzene; Octanitrocubane
- Except where otherwise noted, data are given for materials in their standard state (at 25 °C [77 °F], 100 kPa). verify (what is ?) Infobox references

Hexanitroethane (HNE) is an organic compound with chemical formula C_{2}N_{6}O_{12} or (O_{2}N)_{3}C-C(NO_{2})_{3}. It is a solid matter with a melting point of 135 °C.

Hexanitroethane is used in some pyrotechnic compositions as a nitrogen-rich oxidizer, e.g. in some decoy flare compositions and some propellants. Like hexanitrobenzene, HNE has been investigated as a gas source for explosively pumped gas dynamic lasers.

A composition of HNE as oxidizer with boron as fuel is being investigated as a new explosive.

== Preparation ==
The first synthesis was described by Wilhelm Will in 1914, using the reaction between the potassium salt of tetranitroethane with nitric acid.

C_{2}(NO_{2})_{4}K_{2} + 4 HNO_{3} → C_{2}(NO_{2})_{6} + 2 KNO_{3} + 2 H_{2}O

A practicable method for industrial use starts with furfural, which first undergoes oxidative ring-opening by bromine to mucobromic acid. In the following step, mucobromic acid is reacted with potassium nitrite at just below room temperature to form the dipotassium salt of 2,3,3-trinitropropanal. The final product is obtained by nitration with nitric acid and sulfuric acid at −60 °C.

== Properties ==
The thermal decomposition of hexanitroethane has been detected at 60 °C upwards in both the solid and solution phases. Above 140 °C, this can occur explosively. The decomposition is first order and is significantly faster in solution than in the solid. For the solid, the following reaction can be formulated:

C_{2}(NO_{2})_{6} → 3 NO_{2} + NO + N_{2}O + 2 CO_{2}

For the decomposition in solution, tetranitroethylene is first formed and can be trapped and detected as a Diels–Alder adduct, for example with anthracene or cyclopentadiene.
