= Ceramics museum =

Type of museum

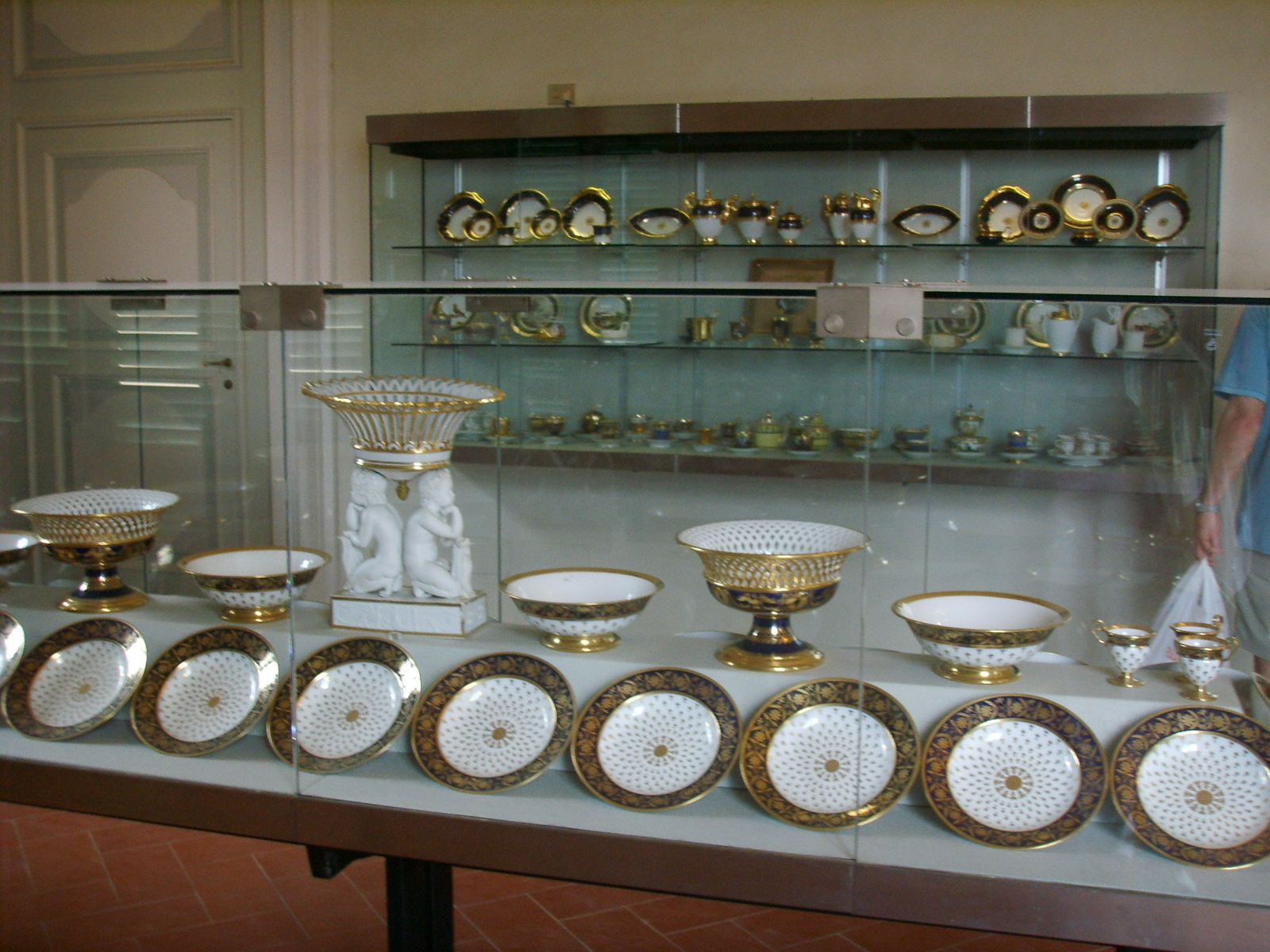
A Sèvres dinner-service on display at the Museo delle porcellane di Firenze.

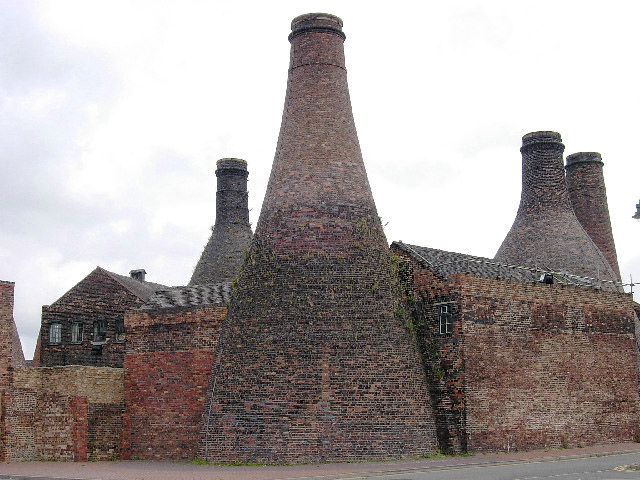
The Gladstone Pottery Museum.

A ceramics museum is a museum wholly or largely devoted to ceramics, usually ceramic art. Its collections may also include glass and enamel, but typically concentrate on pottery, including porcelain. Most national collections are in a more general museum covering all of the arts, or just the decorative arts. However, there are a number of specialized ceramics museums, with some focusing on the ceramics of just one country, region or manufacturer. Others have international collections, which may be centered on ceramics from Europe or East Asia or have a more global emphasis.

Outstanding major ceramics collections in general museums include The Palace Museum, Beijing, with 340,000 pieces, and the National Palace Museum in Taipei city, Taiwan (25,000 pieces); both are mostly derived from the Chinese Imperial collection, and are almost entirely of pieces from China. In London, the Victoria and Albert Museum (over 75,000 pieces, mostly after 1400 CE) and British Museum (mostly before 1400 CE) have very strong international collections. The Metropolitan Museum of Art in New York and Freer Gallery of Art in Washington DC (12,000, all East Asian) have perhaps the best of the many fine collections in the large city museums of the United States. The Corning Museum of Glass, in Corning, New York, has more than 45,000 glass objects.

Many of the historic ceramics manufacturers have museums at or very near their factories, sometimes owned by the company, sometimes independent institutions. These usually mainly or entirely contain their own wares. Some of these are large and significant. Among the more important ones, with large collections, covered in the articles on the concern, are: Meissen porcelain, Nymphenburg Porcelain Manufactory, Doccia porcelain, Royal Worcester, Wedgwood (now independent), Royal Crown Derby and Herend Porcelain.

== Specialist museums ==
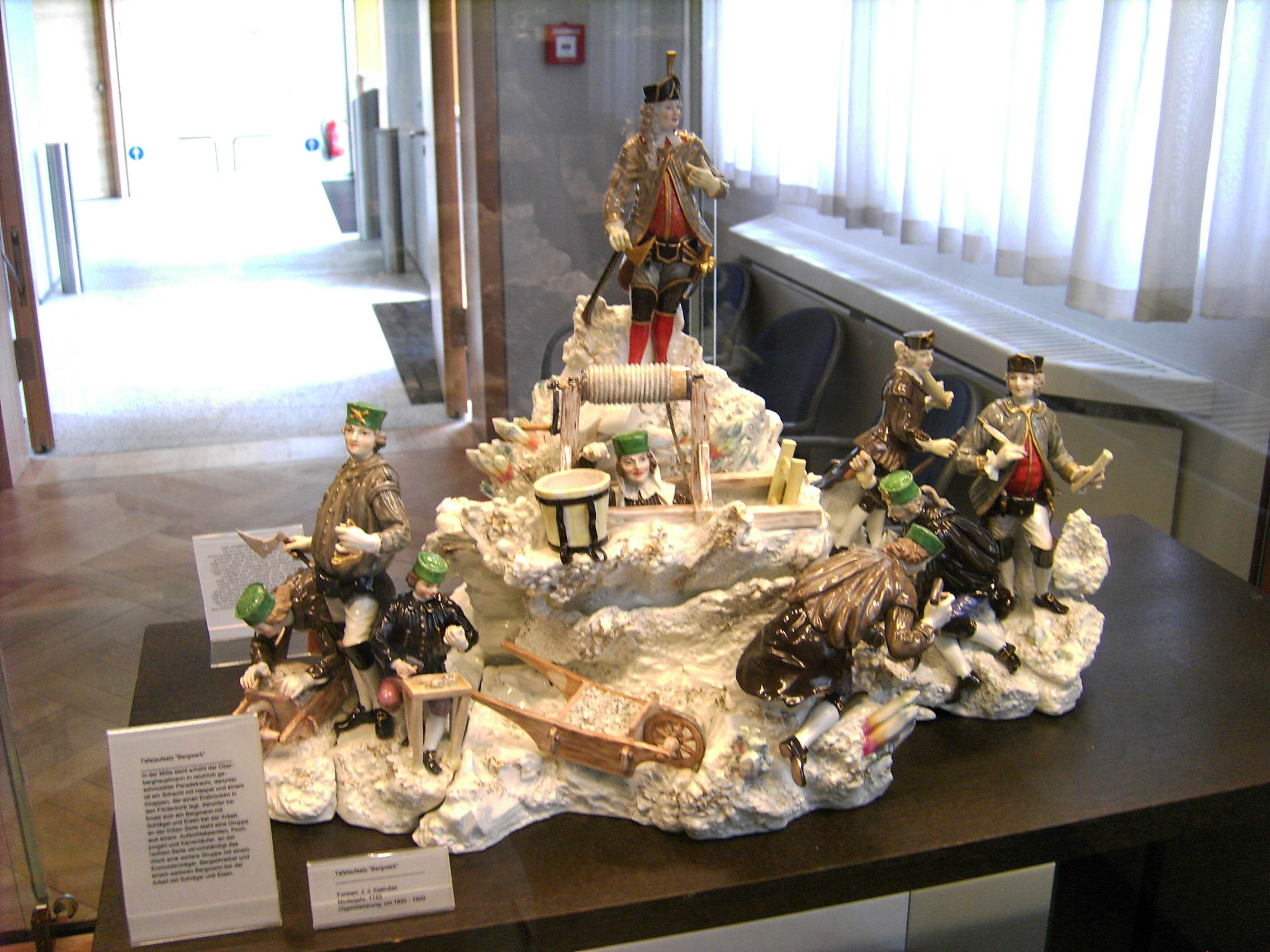
Porcelain miners at the Meissen Porcelain Museum

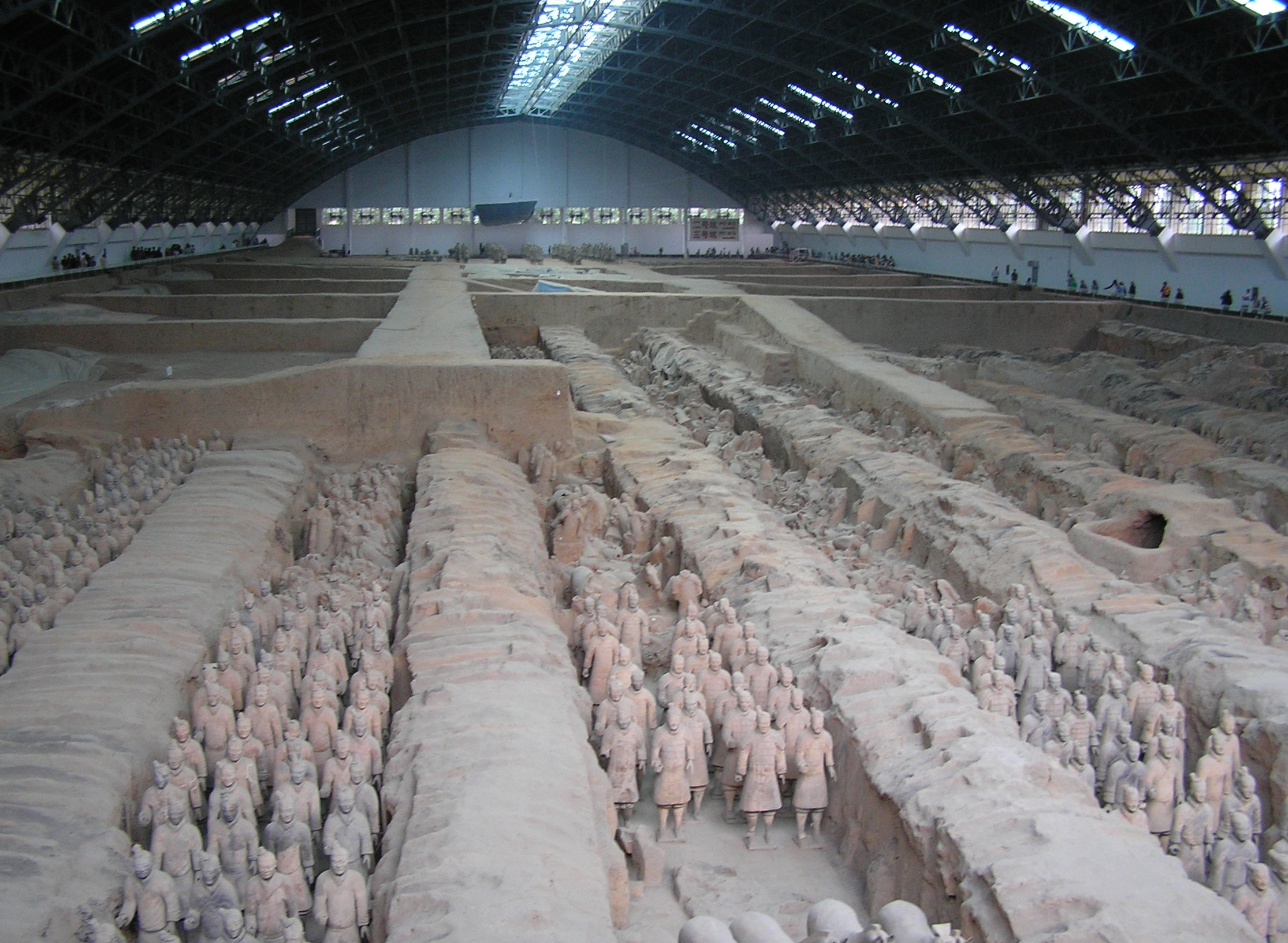
The Terracotta Army on display; view from visitor's gallery.

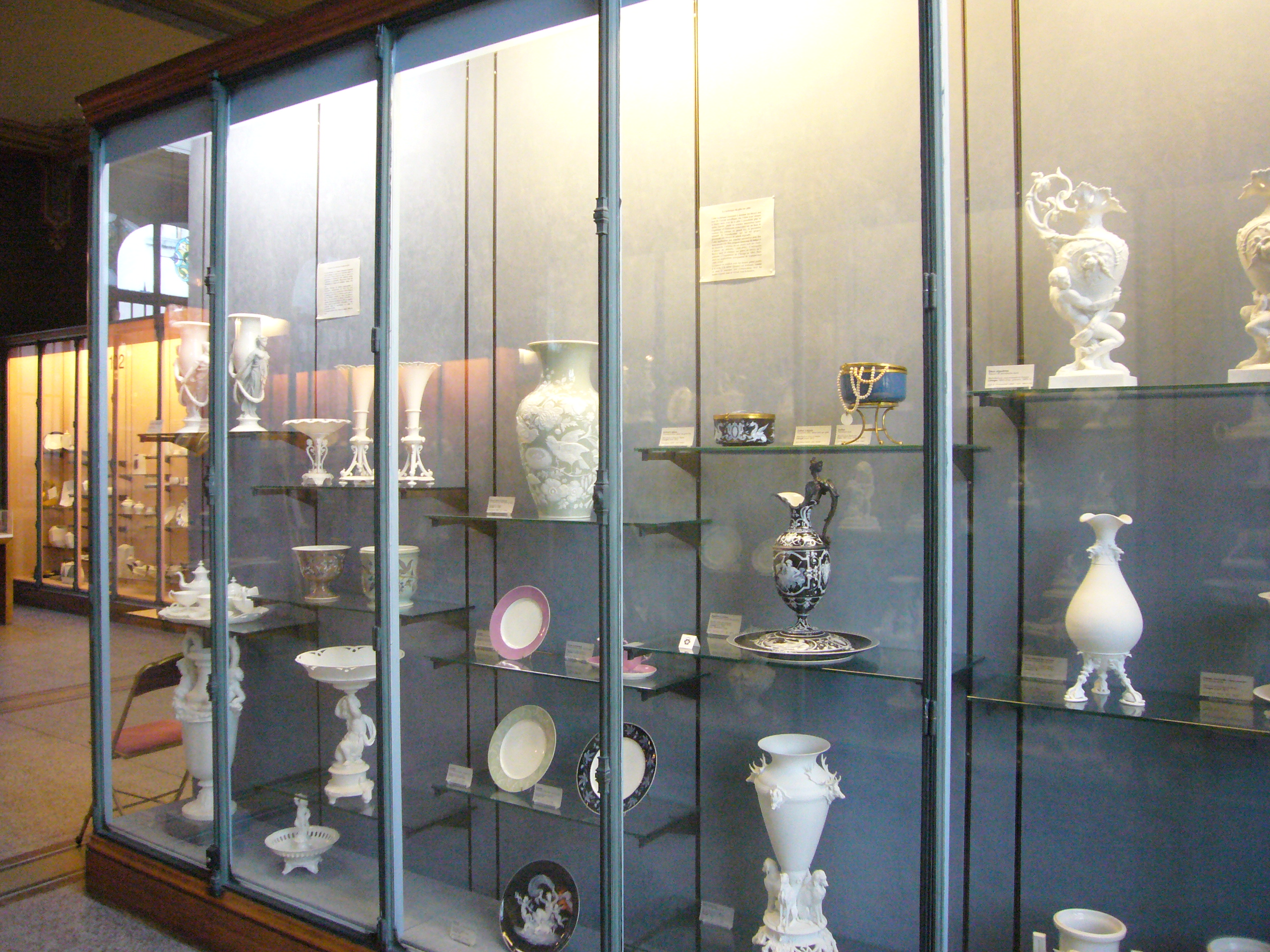
The Musée nationale de la porcelaine Adrien Dubouché in Limoges concentrates on the local Limoges porcelain.

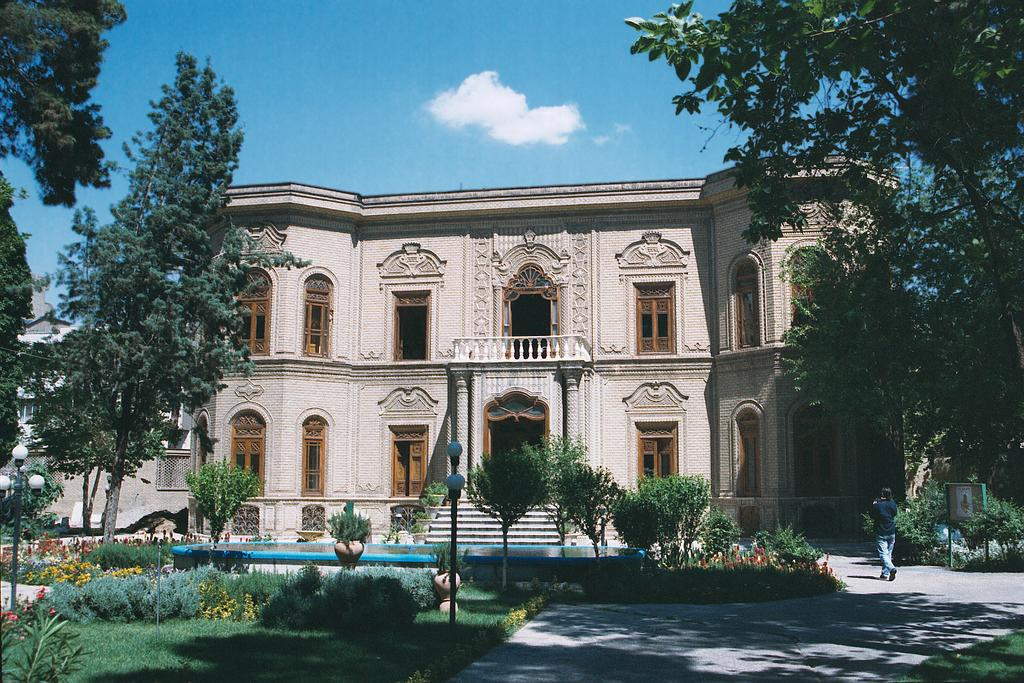
The 19th-century building (formerly the Egyptian embassy) of the Tehran The Glassware and Ceramic Museum of Iran.

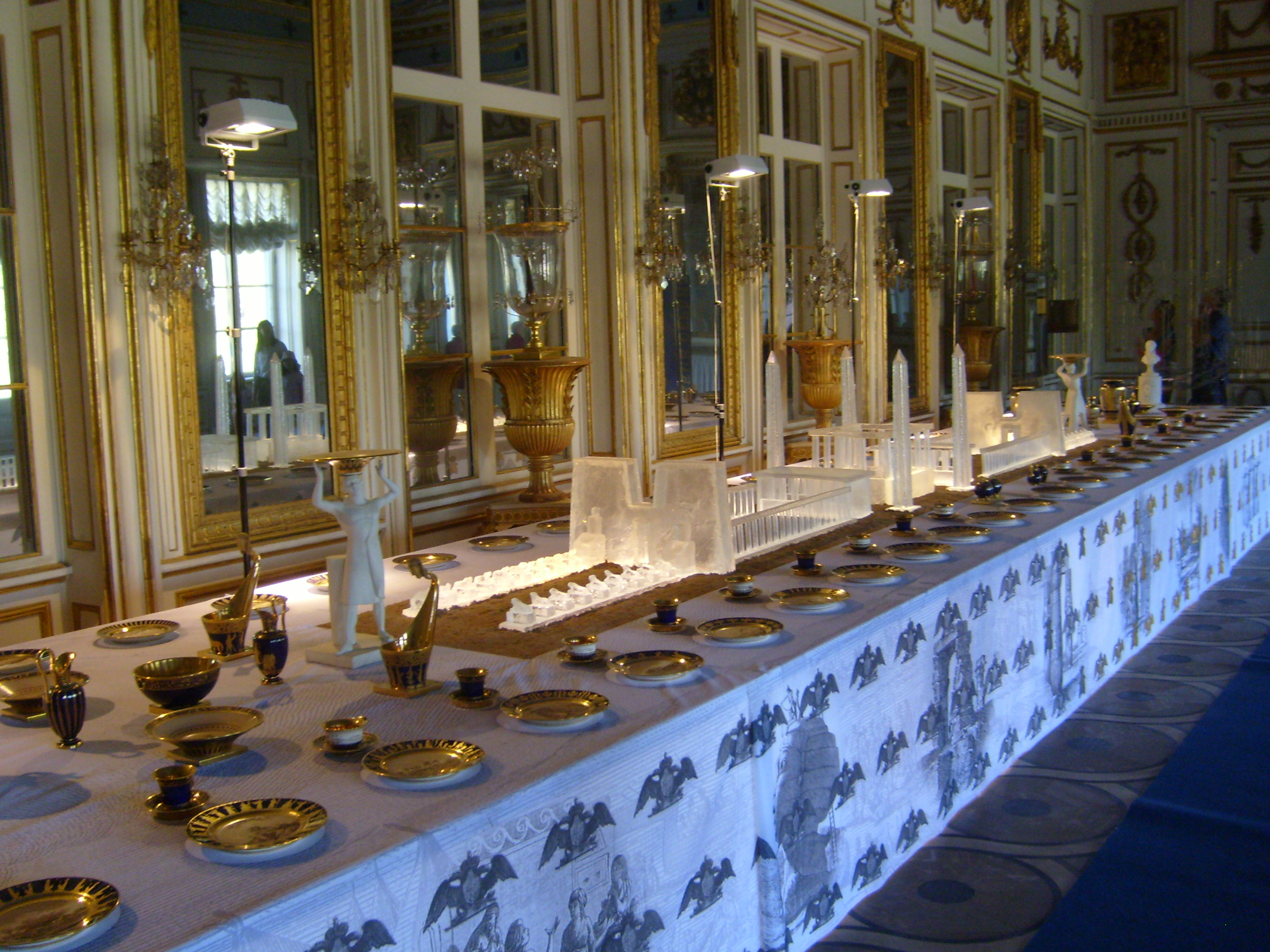
The State Ceramics Museum, Moscow: A dinner service presented by Napoleon to Alexander I of Russia upon signing the Treaties of Tilsit.

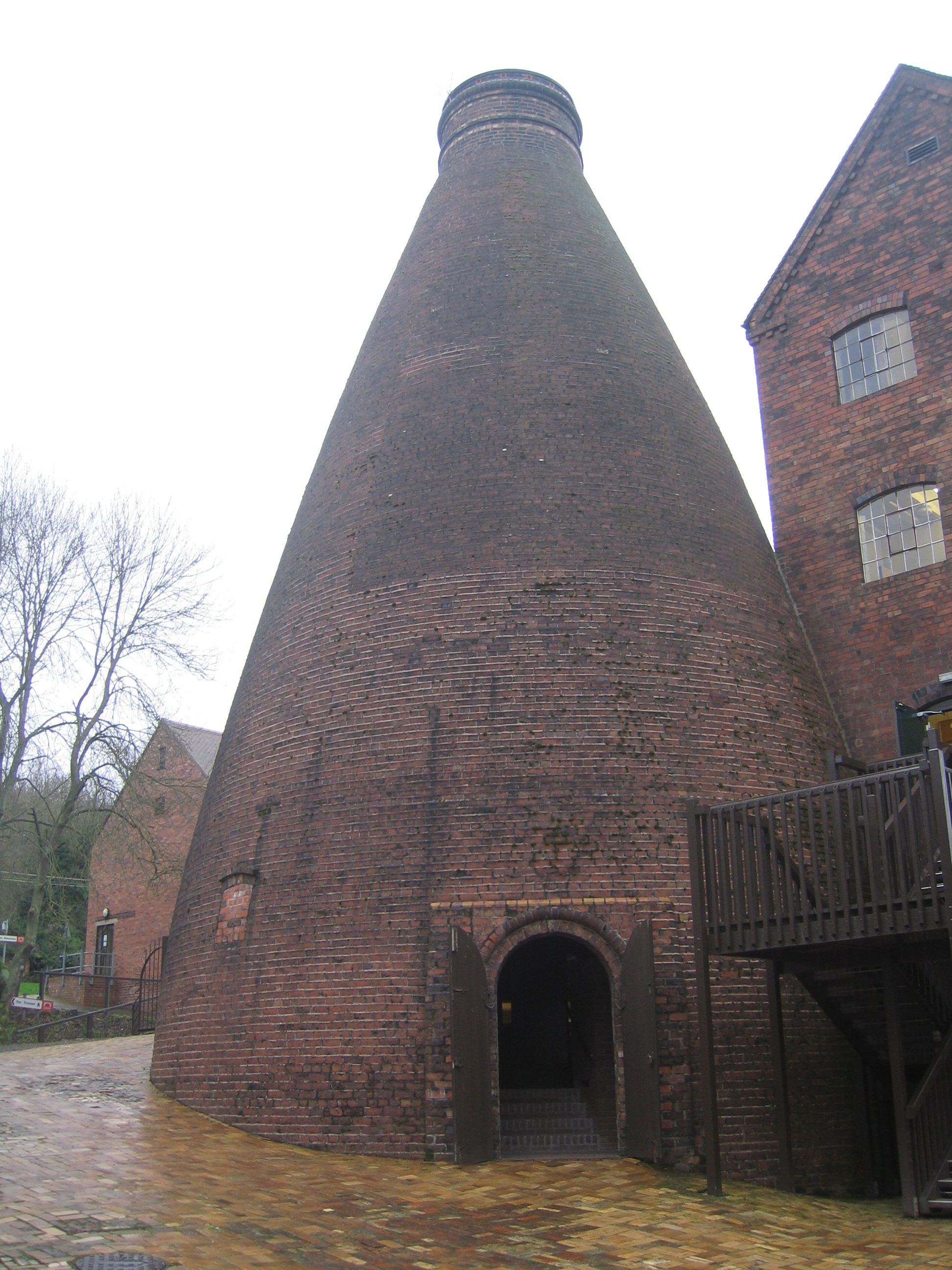
A bottle kiln at the Coalport China Museum.

Some specialist ceramics museums are (number of pieces are approximate):

Australia

- National Museum of Australian Pottery, Holbrook, New South Wales – Australian domestic pottery, 1500 pieces

Belgium

- Musée de la Céramique, Andenne, Wallonia – tells you all about the famous ceramic from the city of Andenne

Brazil

- Museu A CASA, São Paulo, São Paulo.
- Oficina de Cerâmica Francisco Brennand, Recife, Pernambuco. 2000 pieces
- Museu Udo Knoff de Azulejaria e Cerâmica, Salvador, Bahia. 1200 pieces

Canada

- Gardiner Museum, Toronto, with 3,000 pieces.
- Medalta in the Historic Clay District, Medicine Hat, Alberta, 53,000.

China

- FLICAM, near Xi'an is a museum for international contemporary ceramics
- Liuwan Museum of Ancient Painted Pottery, 38,000 Chinese archaeological finds
- Mumingtang Ancient Porcelain Museum, Beijing
- Sihai Teapot Museum, a museum dedicated to teapots in Shanghai. Founded by Xu Sihai in 1992, the Sihai Teapot Museum is also the first private museum established in modern Shanghai.
- The Terracotta Army are on display where they were discovered near Xi'an
- Yixing Ceramics Museum, 30,000 pieces, mainly from the Yixing area.

Czech Republic

- Museum of Czech Porcelain, Prague

Denmark

- CLAY Keramikmuseum Danmark, Grimmerhus, Kongebrovej 42, DK-5500 Middelfart. Website: CLAY Keramikmuseum Danmark, Kongebrovej 42, 5500 Middelfart.

France

- Sèvres - Cité de la céramique, 50,000 pieces, 5,000 of Sèvres porcelain and contemporary ceramics
- Musée de la Ceramique, Rouen, 5,000 pieces, 900 displayed, mostly local faience.
- Musée national de la porcelaine Adrien-Dubouché, Limoges, 18,000 pieces, mostly Limoges porcelain also rare pieces by Böttger
- The extensive archaeological excavations at La Graufesenque, one of the major production centres of Ancient Roman pottery, are open to the public with a museum on the potteries.
- Musée Départemental de la Céramique, Lezoux.
- Musée de la Céramique de Desvres, Desvres.

Germany

- Waechtersbach ceramics in Brachttal, Hesse
- Zwinger Museum - the Porzellansammlung, or Porcelain Collection, at the Zwinger Museum in Dresden
- Hetjens-Museum or Deutsches Keramik-Museum in Düsseldorf, 15,000 pieces
- Terra-Sigillata-Museum Rheinzabern, Rheinzabern, for Ancient Roman terra sigillata ware made near the town

Iran

- The Glassware and Ceramic Museum of Iran, Tehran

Italy

- Museo della Ceramica, in the Picture Gallery, Savona,
- Museo della Ceramica Giuseppe Gianetti, in Saronno,
- Museo delle porcellane, in the Boboli Gardens, Florence
- International Museum of Ceramics, in Faenza,
- Antiquarium Turritano
- Montelupo Museum of Tuscan Ceramics, Montelupo Fiorentino

Japan

- claims to have over 500 ceramics museums, public and private, including ones at Ibaraki, Bizen, Kyoto, Arita (Kyushu Ceramic Museum), and Tokyo. The Arita Porcelain Park is perhaps the world's only theme park based on ceramics.
- NGK Museum, specializing in porcelain insulators

South Korea

- Clayarch Gimhae Museum, Gimhae
- Goryeo Celadon Museum, formerly known also as the Gangjin Celadon Museum, Gangjin County
- Gyeonggi Museum of Contemporary Ceramic Art (GMoCCA) formerly known as Icheon World Ceramic Center, Icheon
- Gyeonggi Museum of Ceramic Design (GMoCD), Yeoju
- Gyeonggi Ceramic Museum Gwangju
- Haegang Ceramics Museum, Icheon
- Sechang Artistic Ceramic Institute, Icheon
- Seokbong Ceramic Museum, Sokcho

The Netherlands

- Princessehof Ceramics Museum, Leeuwarden,
- Ceramics Museum Tienschuur, Tegelen – tells about the renowned ceramics tradition in the Tegelen region, but also displays an extensive collection of contemporary ceramics by Dutch and international ceramists.

Portugal

- Museu de Cerâmica, Caldas da Rainha, Portuguese and other ceramics,
- Museu de Cerâmica de Sacavém, Sacavém

Russia

- State Ceramics Museum, Kuskovo Palace, Moscow, 30,000 pieces, Russian, French and other ceramics from the Sheremetev collection,
- The Hermitage, Saint Petersburg - includes the Museum of The Imperial Porcelain Factory and the famous Frog service made by Josiah Wedgwood for Catherine the Great.
- Pottery Museum, Skopin, Ryazan Oblast, Skopin pottery
- «Keramarkh» museum of architectural ceramics in the Peter & Paul Fortress, Saint Petersburg.

Spain.

- Museu de Ceràmica, in the Museu de les Arts Aplicades, Barcelona.
- Museo Nacional de Cerámica y de las Artes Suntuarias González Martí, Valencia, with over 5,000 pieces, mostly produced in the region.

Switzerland

- Musée Ariana: Swiss Museum for Ceramics and Glass, Geneva

Sweden

- Gustavsberg Porcelain Museum (Gustavsberg, Stockholm), the history of the Gustavsberg Porcelain Factory

Taiwan

- New Taipei City Yingge Ceramics Museum

Thailand

- Southeast Asian Ceramics Museum, Bangkok, opened 2005, 2,000 pieces of the pottery of Thailand and neighbouring countries.

Ukraine

- Pottery Museum, Novoselivka, Vinnytsia Oblast
- Folk Pottery Museum, Opyshnia, Poltava Oblast

United Kingdom

- Aberystwyth University Ceramics Collection
- Coalport China Museum, mainly Coalport China
- Gladstone Pottery Museum - working pottery museum
- Jackfield Tile Museum
- Museum of Royal Worcester, at the old Royal Worcester factory site.
- Percival David Foundation of Chinese Art, Bloomsbury, London. 1,400 pieces of classic Chinese porcelain from the 10th to 18th centuries.
- Potteries Museum & Art Gallery, mainly Staffordshire pottery
- Spode Museum, for Spode
- Wedgwood Museum

United States

- Alfred Ceramic Art Museum, Alfred, New York, 8,000 pieces, including glass.
- American Museum of Ceramic Art (Pomona, California), 7,000 pieces
- Inamori Kyocera Museum of Fine Ceramics, Alfred, New York, focus on advanced engineered ceramics for technical uses.
- International Museum of Dinnerware Design, Kingston, New York, 9,000 pieces with focus on fine art referencing dining.
- Museum of Ceramics (East Liverpool, Ohio), 4,000 mainly Ohio pottery

== See also ==
- List of museums with major collections of Asian art
- List of museums with major collections of Islamic art
- List of museums with major collections of Greek and Roman antiquities
