= Museum of Ceramics =

Museum of Ceramics or Ceramics Museum or Museu de Cerâmica may refer to any ceramics museum or, more specifically:

(by country)

- Museu de Cerâmica (Caldas da Rainha), in Portugal
- Museum of Ceramics (East Liverpool, Ohio), USA
