= Center for Research, Information Management and Media Development Museum =

Museum in Lagos, Nigeria

CRIMMD Museum
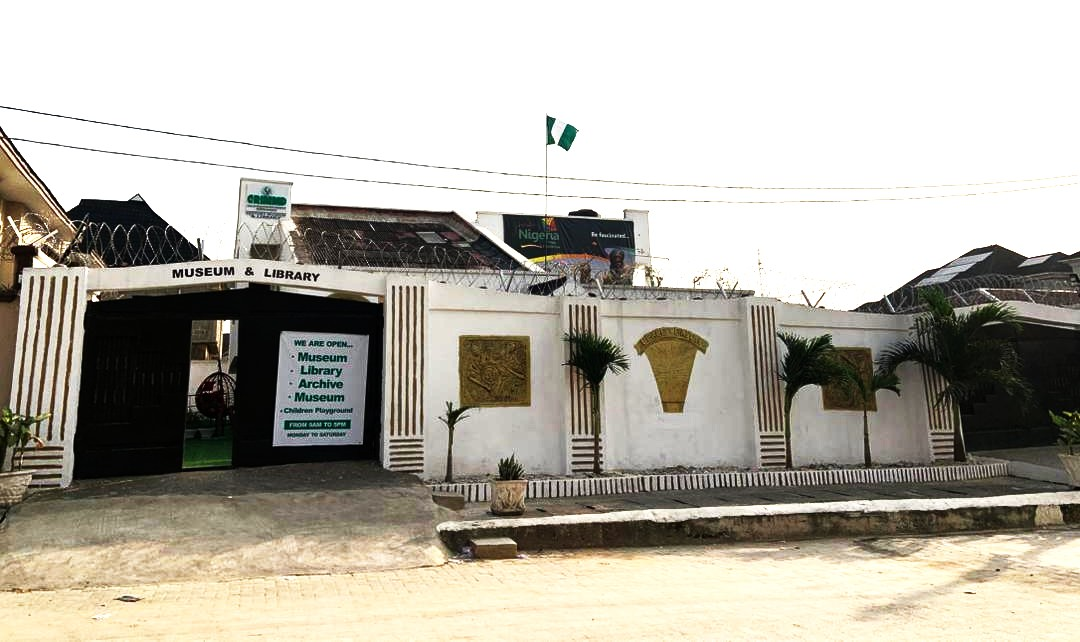
- CRIMMD Library & Museum, Lagos
- Established: October 1, 2014; 11 years ago
- Location: Idimu - Lagos, Nigeria
- Coordinates: 6.488203°N 3.854956°E
- Type: Art museum
- Website: www.facebook.com/crimmdlagosng

The CRIMMD Museum, Centre for Research, Information Management and Media Development, is a private museum in Lagos, Nigeria. The museum has collections of Nigerian photo history with over 35,000 photographs. It houses photographs and portraits of the slave trades and its relics from the Berlin Conference of 1884/85, the era of Expeditions of Mungo Park, Richard Landers, etc. The museum is located at 138 Ejigbo-Idimu road, Alimosho Council, Lagos, Nigeria.

== History ==
The museum was first established in 2012 by a Nigerian archivist and private museum owner, Dr Raphael James and inaugurated by the then Minister of Information, Chief Alex Akinyele in Lagos on 1 October 2014 with the basic aim of reliving history and sustaining knowledge accurately which led to his sourcing for photos everywhere except online.

CRIMMD Library was commissioned on December 16, 2004 by the former Federal Minister of Information, Chief Alex Akinyele JP and Deacon Ayo Oshitelu, Chairman of Ejigbo Local Government Area.

The museum's change of goal brought about its change of name from CRIMMD Museum Nigeria of Photo History, Idimu Lagos to CRIMMD Museum of Nigerian History, on 1 October 2020 as a result of its belief that there are lots of things to tell the Nigerian story with. CRIMMD Museum has membership of the Arab Culture and Arts Network-ACAN. The museum's encompassment of ten (10) sections earned it the name ten-in-one museum, which comprises Nigeria Currency Section, Nigeria Postage/Philatelic Section, Nigeria Telecommunications Section, Nigeria Electricity Section, Nigeria Mineral Resources Section, Nigeria Bottles and Caps Section, FESTAC 77 Section, Slave Trade Section and Nigeria Biographies & Archival Section.

The CRIMMD Museum, Goethe Institute and Ford Foundation collaborated in hosting an exhibition entitled, “Nigeria in Transition” from June 12 to June 18, 2024 at the National Museum, Lagos.

== Collections ==
The museum houses collections of artefacts such as old notes and coins, books, maps, photographs, and newspapers. Its Archive Section houses old history books, biographies, newspapers, magazines (dating back to 1920s) such as The Comet Newspapers (1934) and the West African Pilot (1937), published by Nnamdi Azikiwe, First Republic President. It also has the first edition of the Nigerian Tribune (1949), published by Obafemi Awolowo. According to the curator, Dr Raphael James, the museum has 32,000 photographs of prominent Nigerians and important individuals who have contributed to the development the nation.

The museum carries out a library service that was established in December 2004.

== Book donations ==
The museum's library has donated over 53,000 books in Nigeria.

== Gallery ==
CRIMMD museum collections

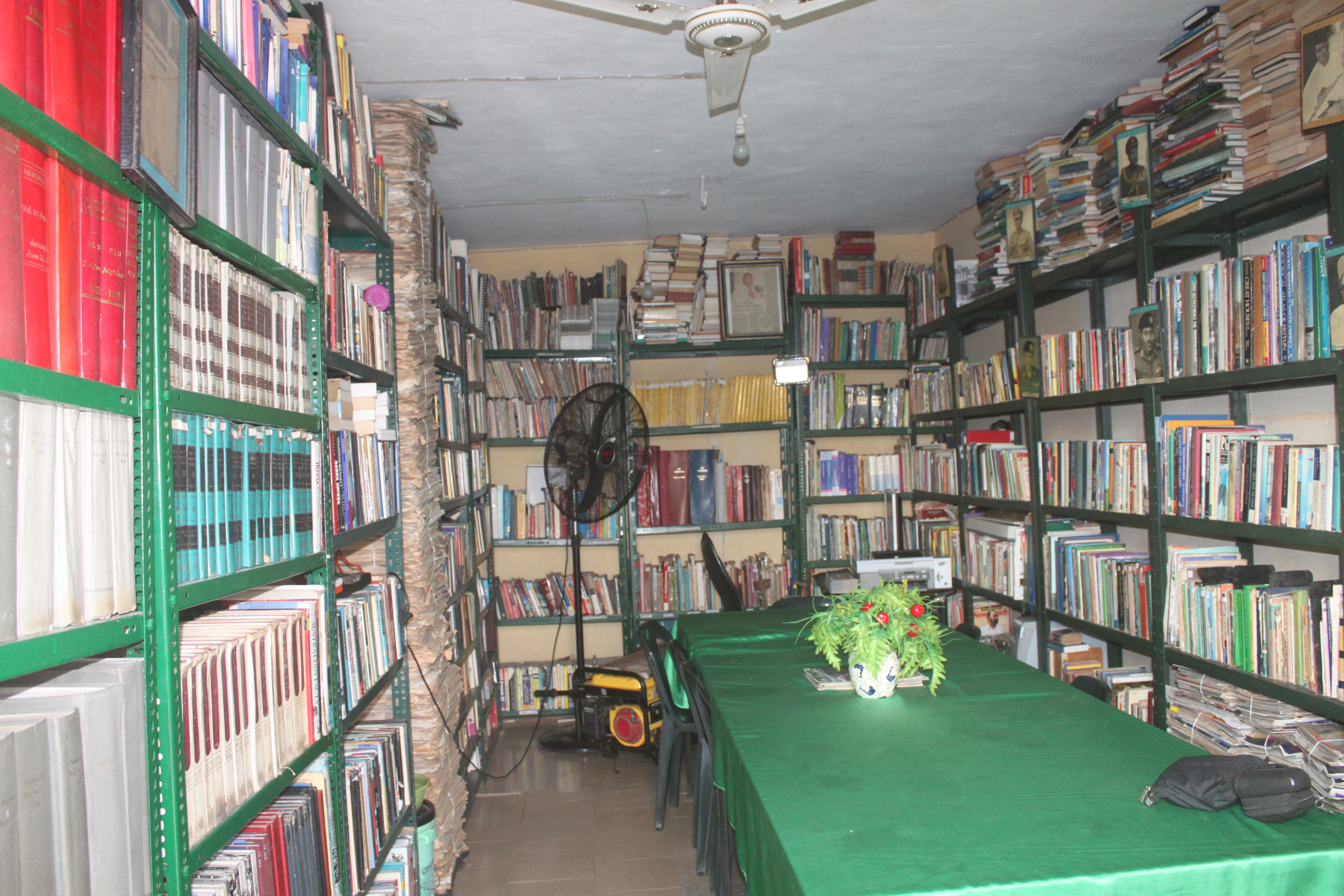
CRIMMD Museum Library

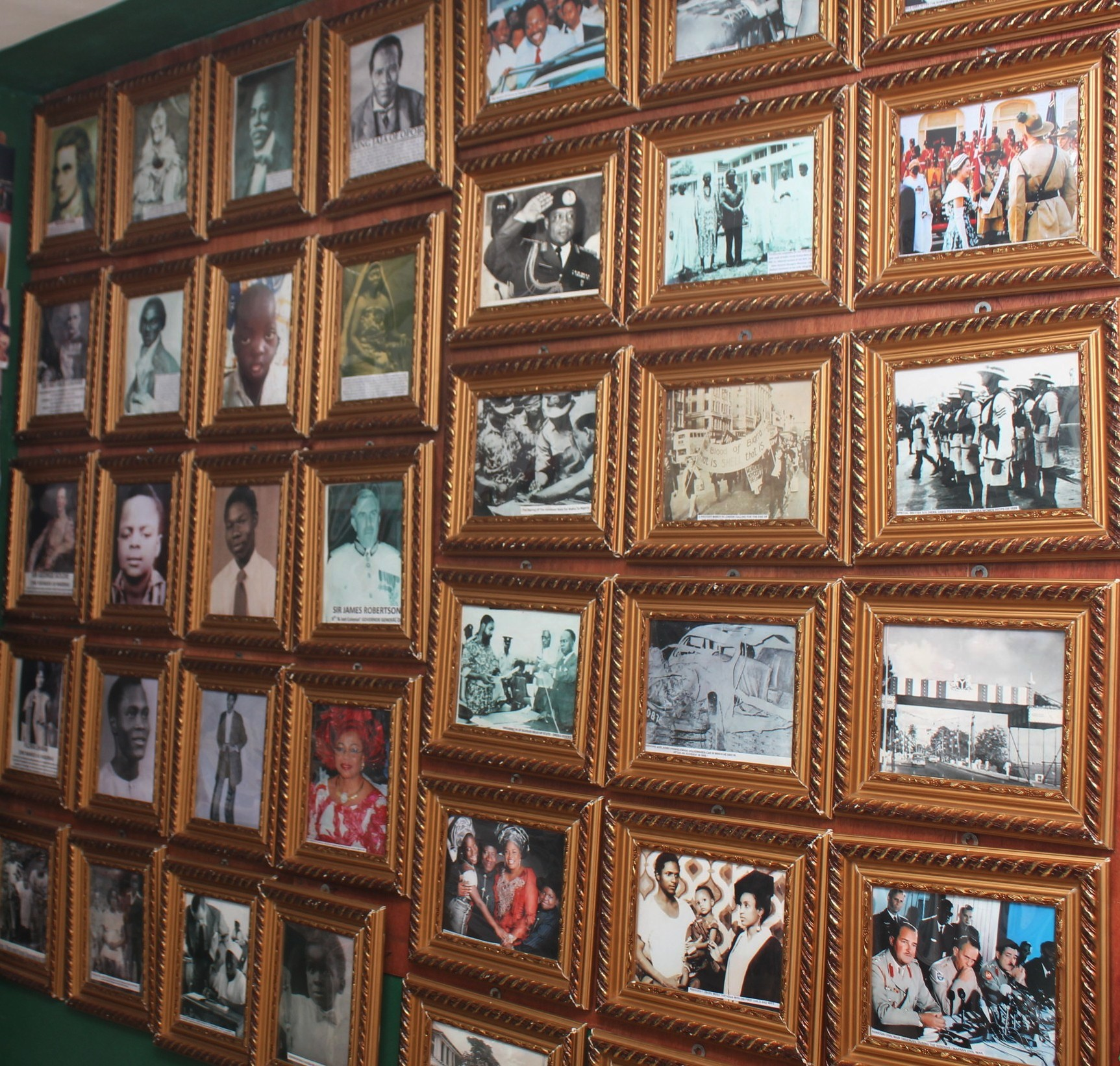
CRIMMD Museum Collection

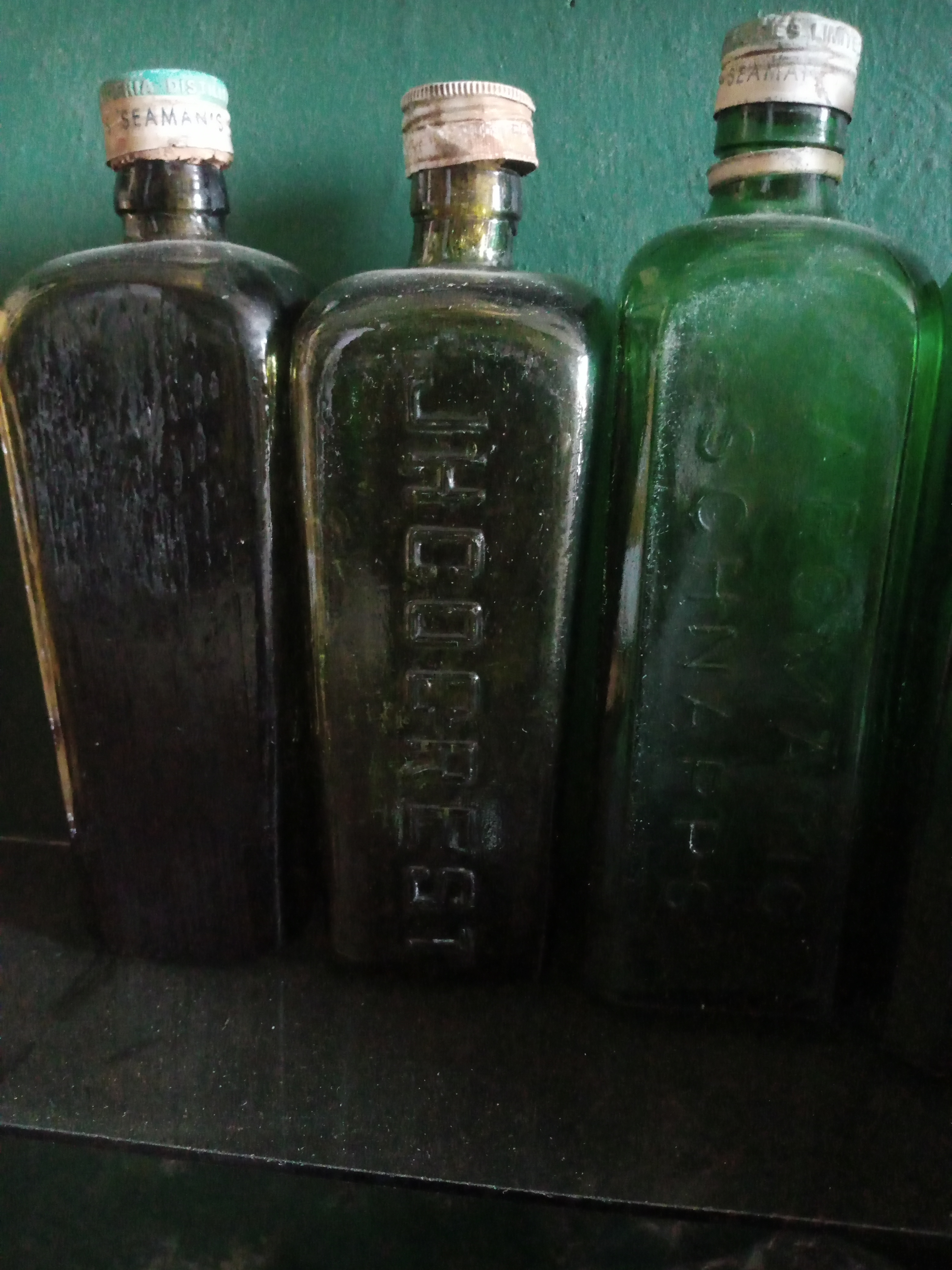
CRIMMD Museum Collection

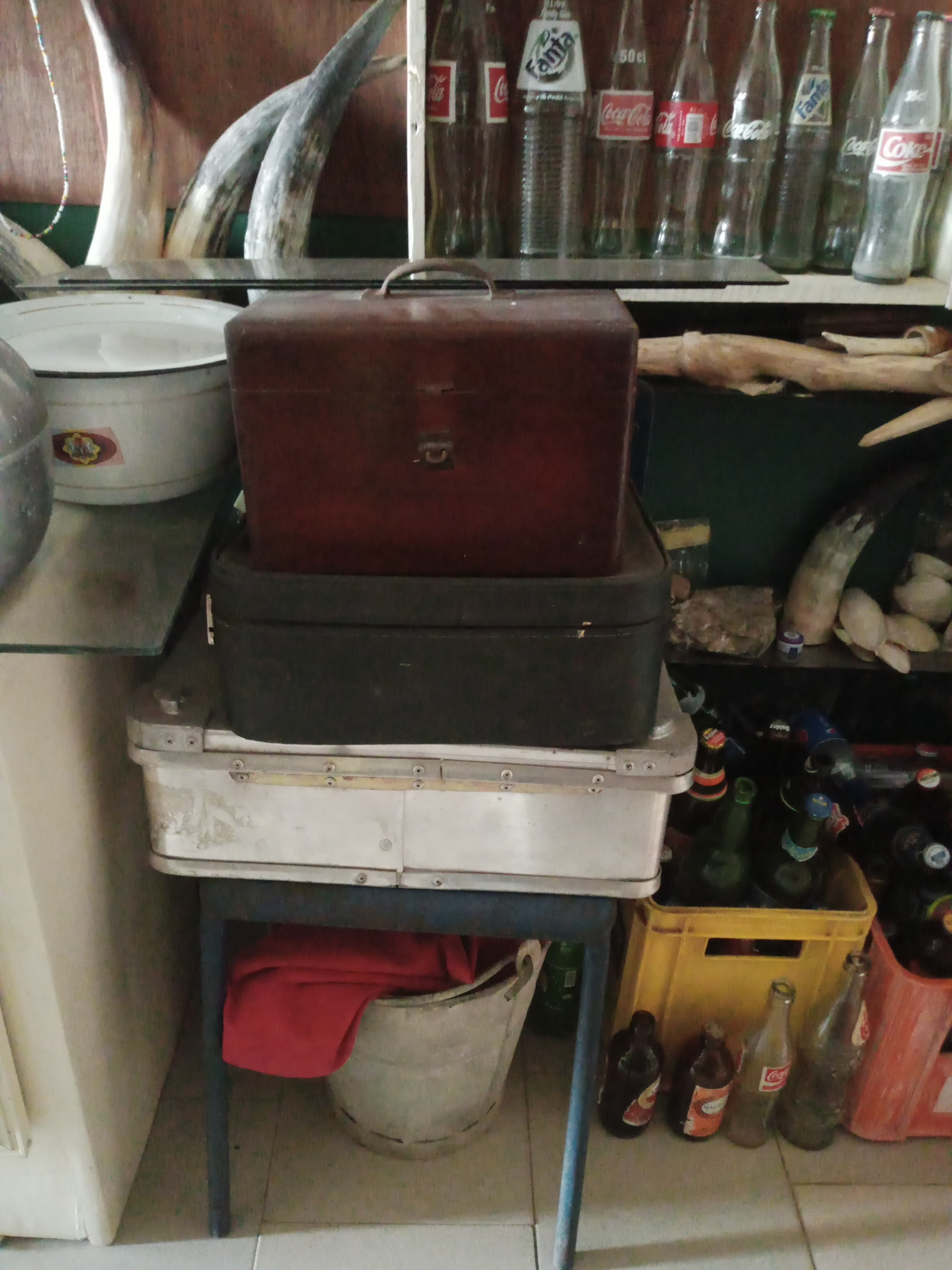
CRIMMD Museum Collection

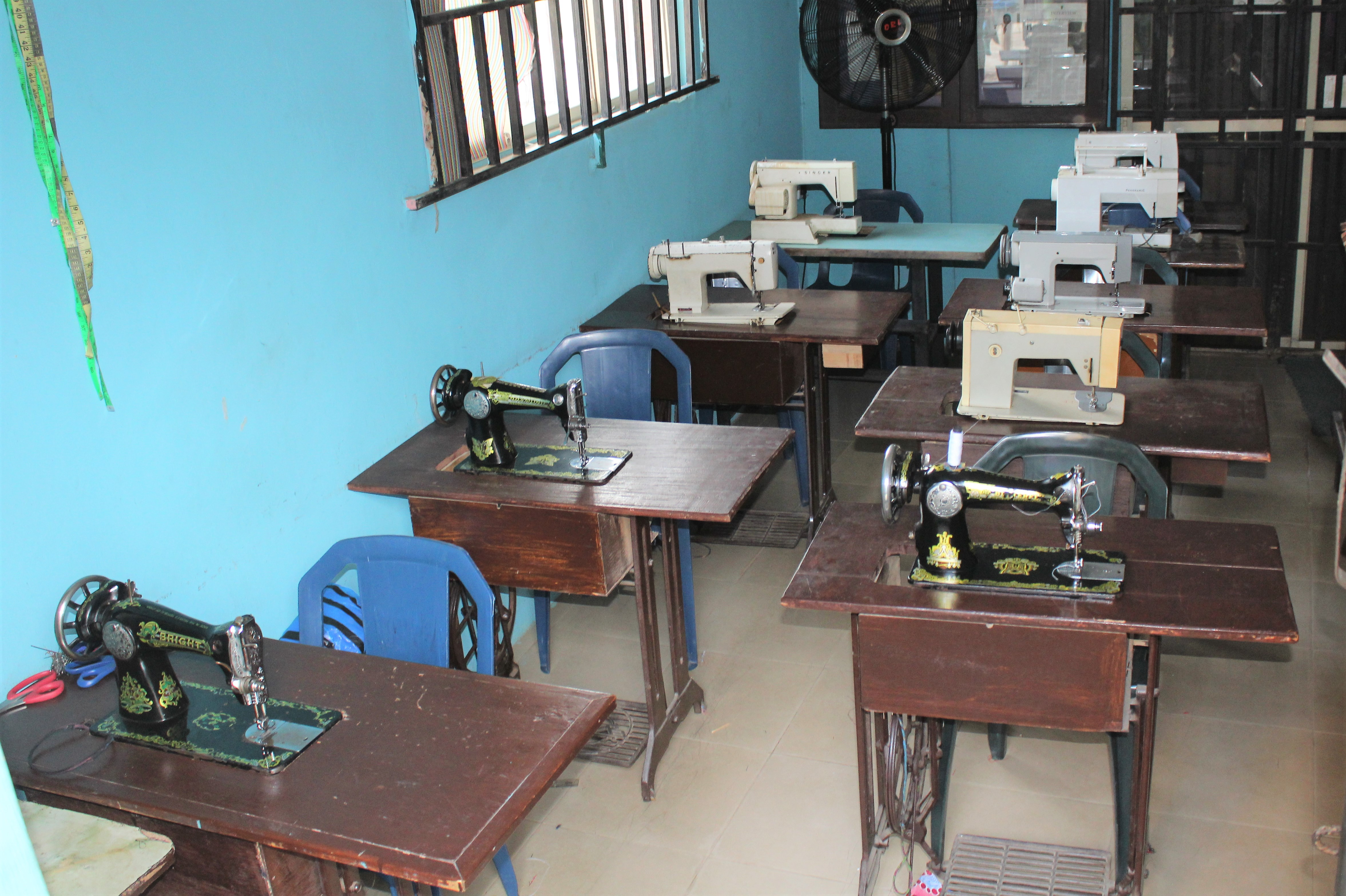
CRIMMD Museum Collection

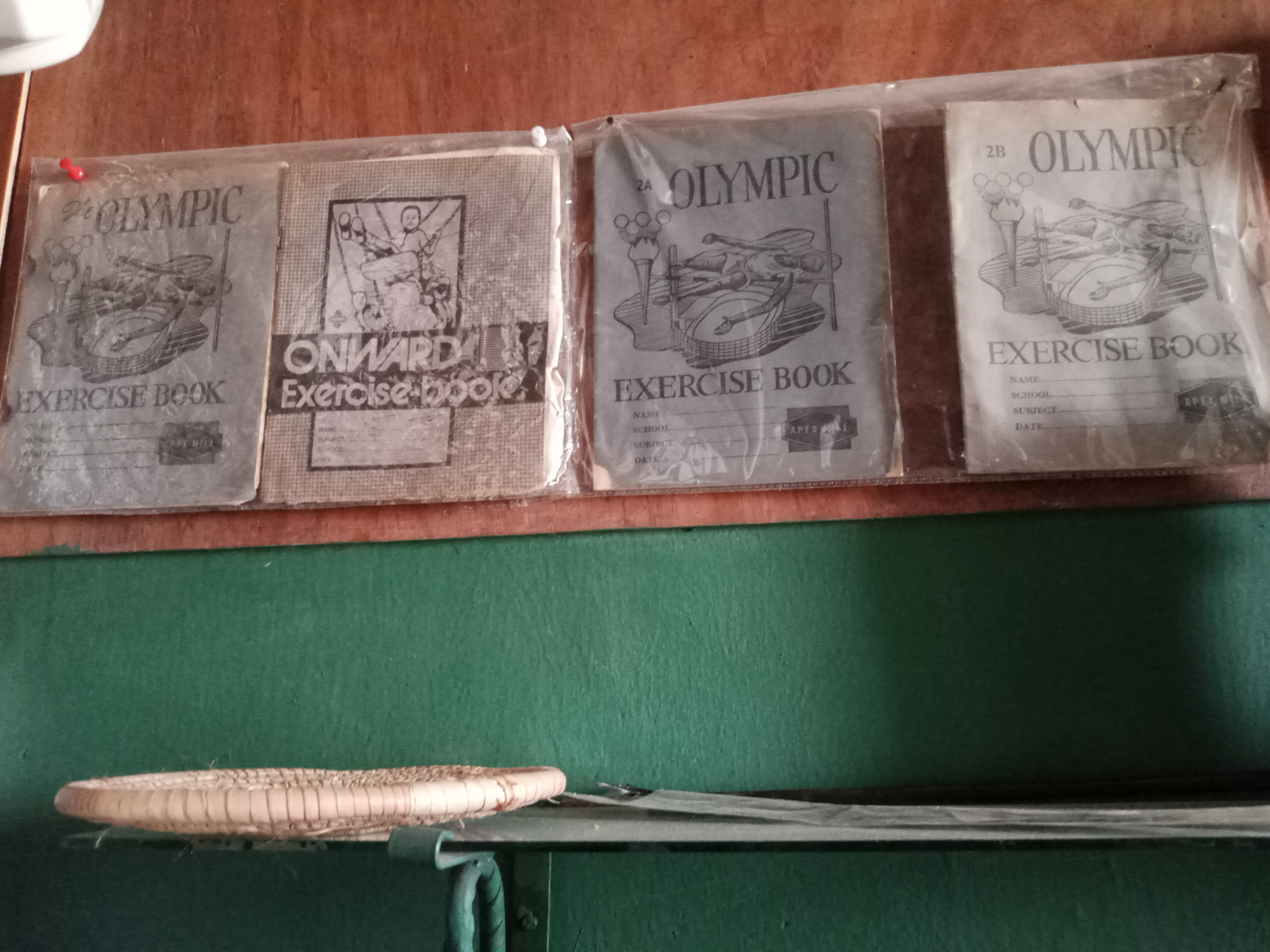
CRIMMD Museum Collection
