= Neon Museum, Warsaw =

Coordinates: 52.24993°N 21.06178°E

Neon Museum in Warsaw
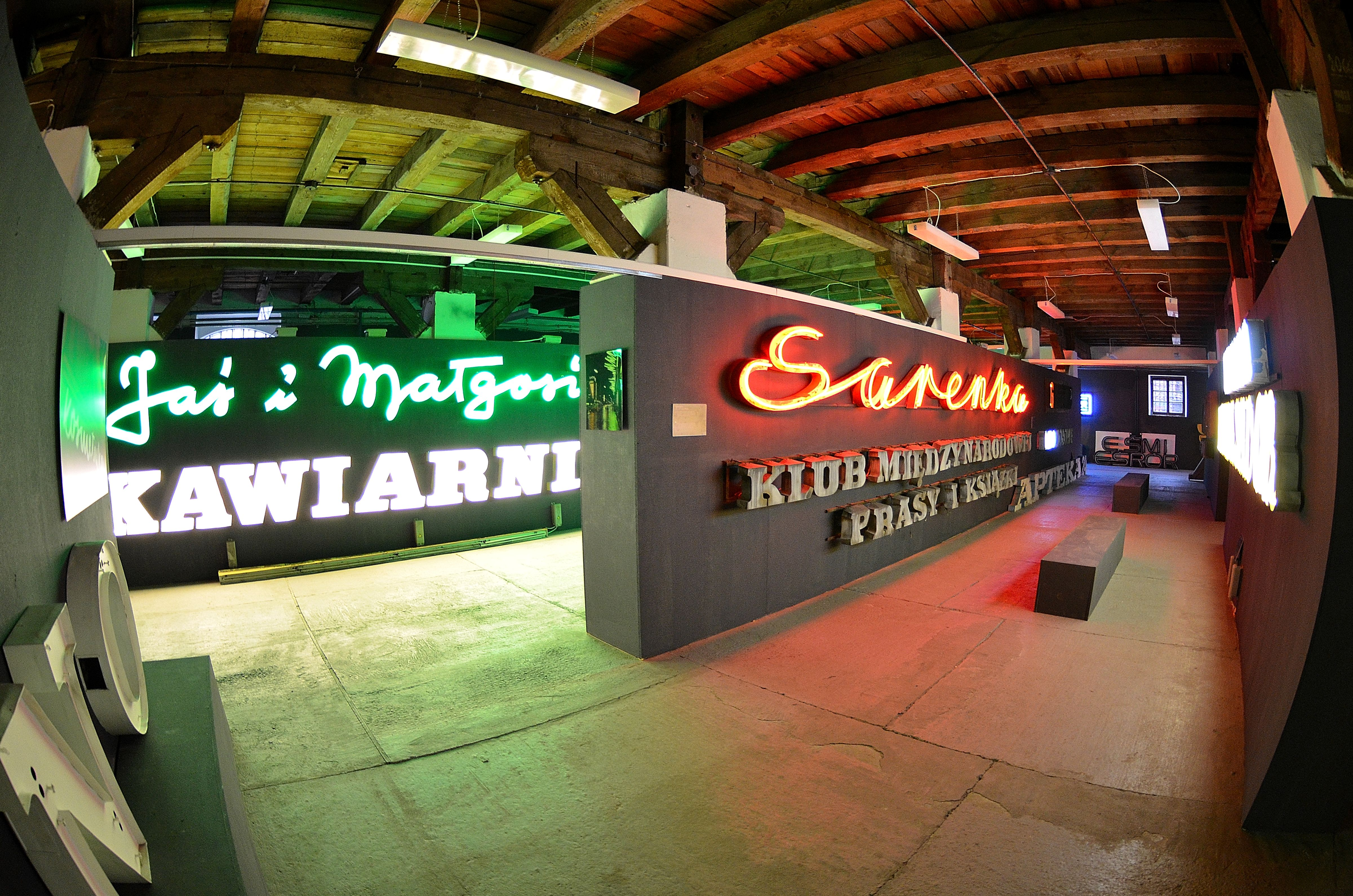
- Established: 19 May 2012; 14 years ago
- Location: pl. Defilad 1, Warsaw, Poland
- Type: private museum
- Collections: Neon signs
- Directors: Ilona Karwińska and David Hill
- Website: www.neonmuzeum.org

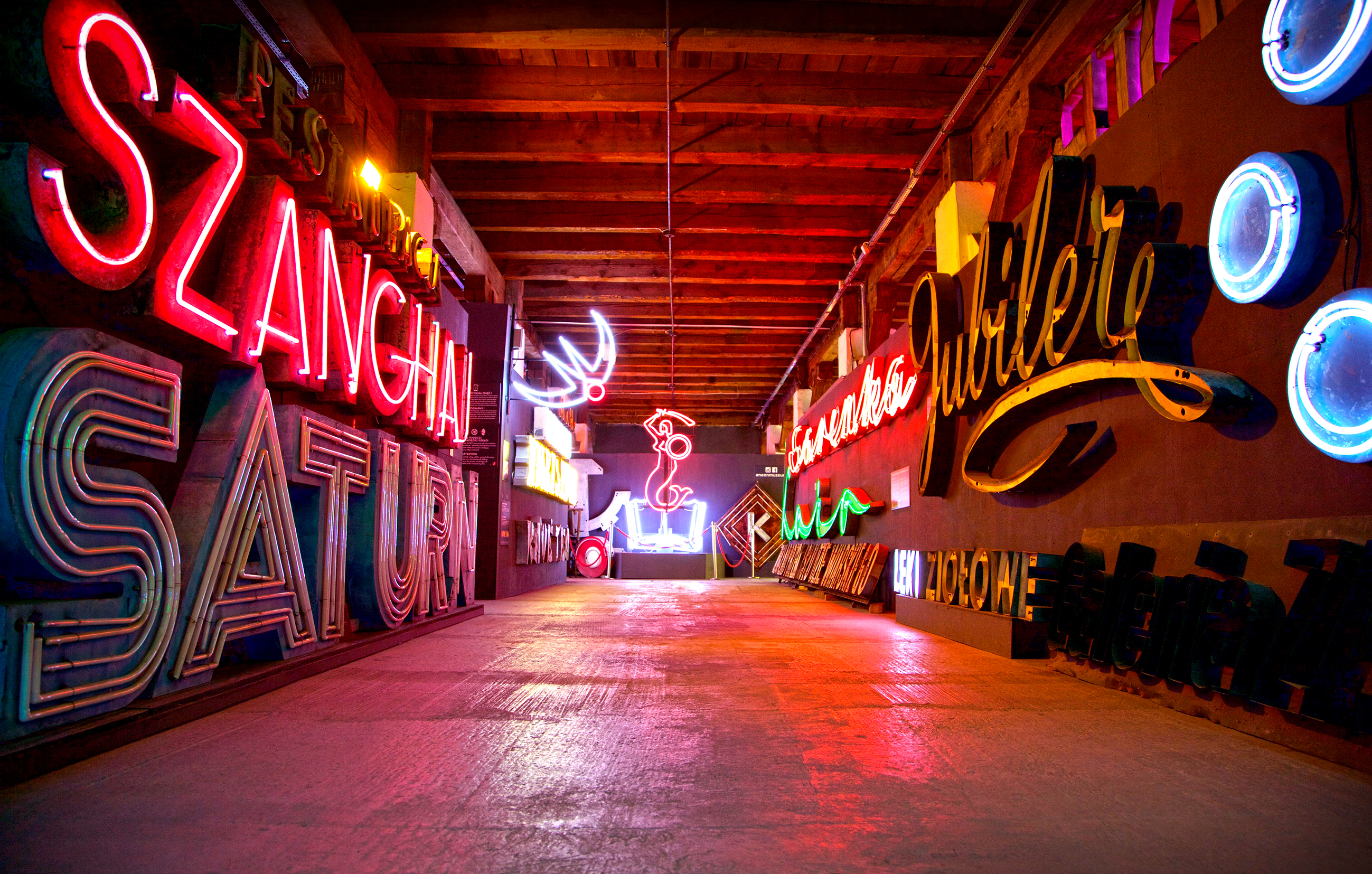
The Neon Muzeum interior.

Neon Museum, also the Museum of Neon (Polish: Muzeum Neonów) is a museum located in Warsaw. The institution documents and protects Polish and Eastern Bloc light advertisements created after World War II. It is the first in Poland and one of the few museums of neon signs in the world.

It relocated in 2025 to the Palace of Culture from its former premises in the district of Praga-Południe at the Soho Factory. It was established in 2012.

Photographer Ilona Karwińska and graphic designer David Hill managed to save more than 200 neon signs and about 500 letters from imminent destruction.

The museum also maintains a huge archive of documentation, drawings, photographs and original plans related to the history of these signs.

First, the guide introduces the visitors to the museum itself and the Soho factory area, and then a double-decker bus takes them through the streets of Warsaw, and the guide tells them where this or that sign, advertisement was installed. A collection of Polish neon signs and advertisements from the socialist era is popular with visitors.

The oldest neon sign is probably located at the Warszawa Stadion train station. The museum acquired, among others, the neon signs of the restaurants "Shanghai" and "Ambasador", the café "Jaś i Małgosia" and the cooperative trading house "Sezam".

The museum's collection includes a "Karina" sign made from the letters of the original neon "Tkaniny dekoracyjne" signage. The sign "Karina" was created during the filming of the movie Aftermath by Władysław Pasikowski about the Jedwabne pogrom.

Exhibitions of the collection were held in London, Luxembourg, Amsterdam.

== History ==
The history of the museum began in 2005 when Ilona Karwińska saved the Berlin neon sign from Marszałkowska Street in Warsaw. The collection of the museum features about 100 neon lights from all over Poland Most of the neons come from the 1960s and 1970s.

The nine largest neon signs including GŁÓWNA KSIĘGARNIA TECHNICZNA (MAIN TECHNICAL BOOKSTORE), Jubiler, dworzec kolejowy CHODZIEŻ (CHODZIEŻ railway station), KINO PRAHA (PRAHA cinema) and WARSZAWA WSCHODNIA are located on different Soho Factory buildings. The museum also looks after some neon signs in Warsaw, including Mermaid on Grójecka Street.

The museum has a large archive containing blueprints, photographs and original plans.

In 2013, the museum together with RWE organized Neon for Warsaw competition.
