= Niterra =

Japanese spark plug and technical ceramics manufacturer

Niterra Co., Ltd.
- Native name: ⽇本特殊陶業株式会社
- Romanized name: Nippon Tokushu Tōgyō kabushiki gaisha
- Formerly: NGK Spark Plug Co., Ltd. (1936–2023)
- Type: Public KK
- Traded as: TYO: 5334; NAG: 5334
- Industry: Automotive, technical ceramics
- Founded: 11 November 1936
- Founder: NGK Insulators
- Headquarters: Nagoya, Japan
- Area served: Worldwide
- Key people: Takeshi Kawai (President and CEO)
- Brands: NGK; NTK
- Number of employees: 15,900 (March 2024)
- Website: www.ngkntk.co.jp

Niterra Co., Ltd. (⽇本特殊陶業株式会社, Nippon Tokushu Tōgyō kabushiki gaisha; lit. 'Japan Special Ceramics' or 'Japanese Special Ceramics') is a public company established in 1936 and based in Nagoya, Japan. Formerly known as NGK Spark Plug Co. Ltd., the company’s automotive business (with its brands NGK Ignition Parts and NTK Vehicle Electronics) revolves around the manufacturing and the sale of spark plugs and related products for internal combustion engines, as well as vehicle electronics and ceramics for a wide range of applications in the automotive industry and beyond.

Niterra is a coined word, which combines the Latin words ‘niteo’ meaning ‘shine’ and ‘terra/earth’. It expresses the Group’s desire to be a company that not only contributes to a sustainable society, but also one that makes the earth shine: a goal formulated in its 2040 Vision.

As of April 2024, the company employs around 15,900 people and the company’s automotive and technical ceramics activities generate a total annual turnover of around 4.45 billion euros worldwide. It operates a network of 61 consolidated subsidiaries, 24 manufacturing and sales organisations, four Technical Centres and three Venture Labs worldwide. In 2021, Niterra moved its global headquarters to the N-Forest Building located at its Komaki Plant in Japan.

== Operations ==
=== United States ===
NGK Spark Plugs (USA) was established in 1966 as a subsidiary of NGK Spark Plug Co., Ltd. of Japan. Its corporate headquarters was first located in California and then moved to its current location in Wixom, Michigan. The company's name was changed to Niterra North America in 2023. Niterra produces both spark plugs and oxygen sensors in Sissonville, West Virginia.

=== Europe ===
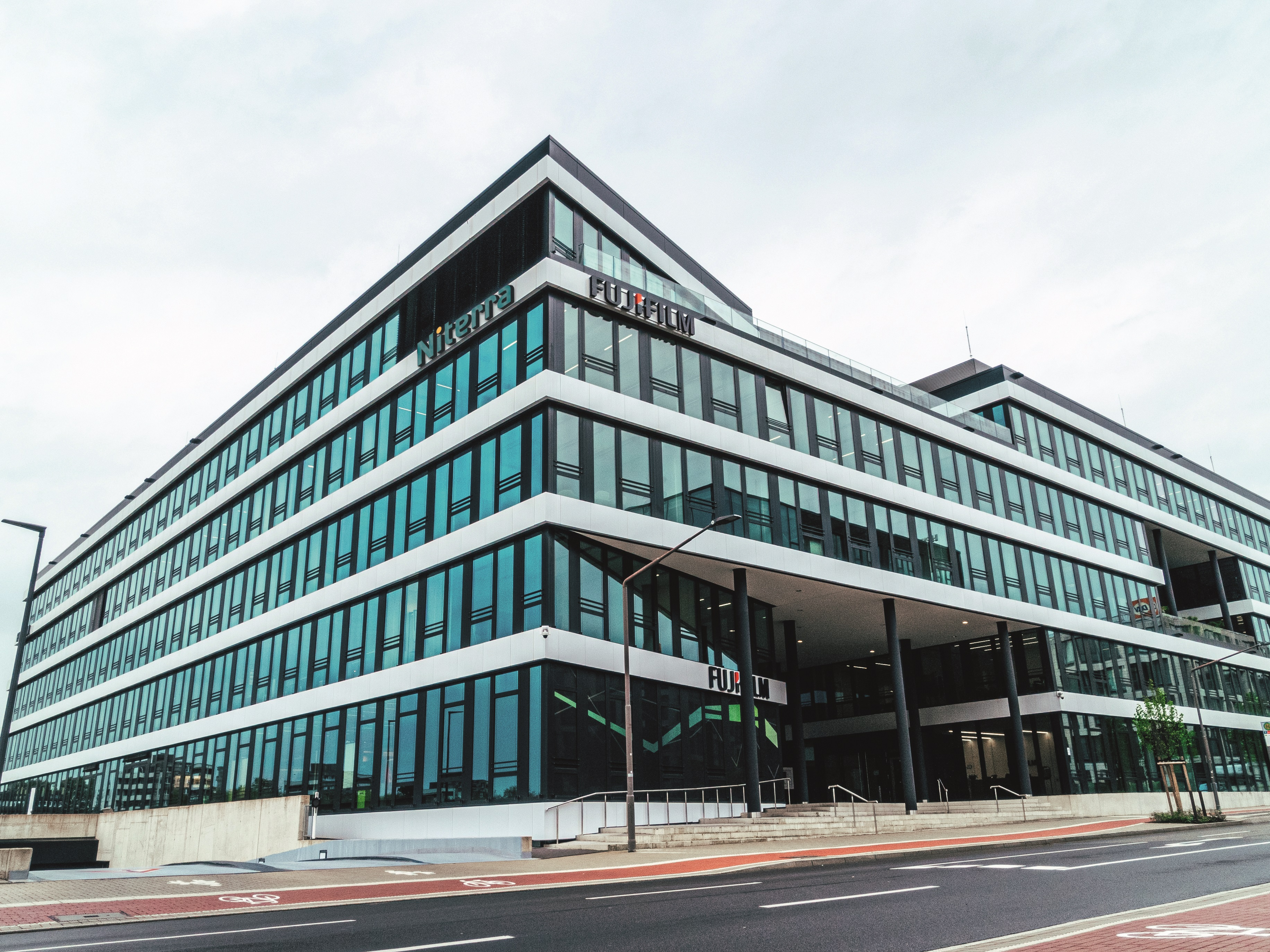
Niterra's EMEA Regional Headquarters, The Square in Ratingen, Germany

Niterra established its first European subsidiary, NGK SPARK PLUG (U.K.) Ltd. in 1975. In 1979, its second European subsidiary, NGK SPARK PLUG DEUTSCHLAND GmbH, was founded in Germany. Ten years later, it was renamed NGK SPARK PLUG EUROPE GmbH when it took charge of operations in Europe. In 2017, its remit further expanded across the EMEA region. In April 2023, the English-language name of the company was renamed Niterra.

Niterra EMEA has been run by Damien Germès, President & CEO of Niterra EMEA GmbH, Regional President EMEA and Corporate Officer of the Global Headquarters in Japan, since April 2019 and it employs approximately 770 people in the EMEA region.

Niterra EMEA has six regional companies and a production plant in South Africa. Its EMEA sales accounted for 24% of the Group’s global turnover in 2023. In its plant in South Africa, 22 million spark plugs are produced annually.

The European division has been operating a dedicated R&D unit since 1990. As well as designing and testing new prototype automotive products, the unit develops technologies to combat issues such as vehicle exhaust emissions. It also provides technical support to car manufacturers in the EMEA region.

In 2017, the company opened a new European Regional Distribution Centre in Duisburg, Germany. It covers 21,000 m² of shelf space, has a team of around 100 employees and supplies customers in 44 European countries.

In 2018, the company became a shareholder of the automotive Aftermarket data firm TecAlliance.

In May 2024, Niterra moved its EMEA Regional Headquarters (RHQ) within the city of Ratingen to Balcke-Dürr-Allee 6, which is situated in the newly redeveloped Schwarzbach Quarter. The move is in response to the company’s sustainability goals and a decision to offer hybrid working patterns to its employees.

== Products ==
Niterra supplies ignition and vehicle electronics products for 4-wheel, 2-wheel, ATV/SSV, snowmobile, agriculture, gardening, marine and industry applications. In the Aftermarket, these products are supplied to parts wholesalers and distributors.

The company’s ignition product range includes spark plugs, glow plugs, ignition coils and ignition leads & caps, which are supplied under the NGK Ignition Parts brand.

Niterra’s range of vehicle electronics includes oxygen sensors, EGTS, MAP/MAF sensors, engine speed & position sensors, EGR valves and exhaust gas & differential pressure sensors (EDPS), all supplied under the NTK Vehicle Electronics brand.

Additionally, the company’s Technical Ceramics business unit produces semiconductor products, fine ceramics and products for the medical industry under NTK Technical Ceramics.

== Future ==
Since 2018, Niterra has created three ‘Venture Labs’ – innovation hubs designed to prepare the company for the future. They focus on three areas: Smart Health, Smart Mobility and Environment & Energy and are located in Tokyo, Japan; Silicon Valley, USA; and Berlin, Germany.

With the goal of achieving carbon neutrality by 2050, Niterra has established ‘Eco Vision 2030’. Based on the United Nations’ ‘Sustainable Development Goals’, this vision sets the milestones for the company until the end of the 2020s and the following ten years leading up to 2040.

Currently, the company is transforming its organisation and business portfolio in a more sustainability-driven direction. Four business fields have been identified for this purpose: Mobility, Medical, Environment & Energy and Communications.

As part of this transformation, the company launched a $100 million Corporate Venture Capital Fund in April 2021 to pursue new opportunities in these areas. Additionally, the company is expanding into new business fields through mergers and acquisitions of enterprises e.g., in the medical field, as well as start-ups, which contribute to this aim with additional digital automotive services.

== Motorsports involvement ==
Niterra is also a supplier of the Scuderia Ferrari Formula 1 team. Niterra was the exclusive spark plug supplier for the IndyCar Series from 2007 to 2011. Since 2012, the company has only supplied Honda-powered IndyCar Series teams. Furthermore, Niterra supports a couple of teams in racing categories such as MotoGP, Moto2, Moto3, the World Rally Championship, the Motocross World Championship, the FIM Trial World Championship and the Superbike World Championship. In 2022, Niterra became the official technical partner of the X-raid motorsport team for the Dakar Rally.

== See also ==
- Insulator Museum
