= Seokbong Ceramic Museum =

Ceramics museum in Sokcho, South Korea

Coordinates: 38.1981°N 128.5826°E

The Seokbong Ceramic Museum is a ceramics museum in Sokcho, South Korea.

The museum was opened in October 1997 by the ceramist Seokbong Jo Moo-ho a.k.a. Cho Mohu (b. 1941) (석봉 조무호). The name of the museum comes from his art name Seokbong. The exterior of the museum is in the form of the typical two-story Korean building. Its walls are decorated with ceramic paintings. The museum displays various ceramic artworks, including a painting of the Baekdu Mountain, one of Korea's largest mountains. Facilities at the museum include a demonstration room, international pavilion, and model pavilion. There is an outdoor stage in the garden to the rear of the museum.

Address: 156 EXPO-ro, Sokcho-si, Gangwon-do, South Korea.

== See also ==
- Ceramic art
- List of ceramics museums in South Korea
- List of museums in South Korea
