= Sihai Teapot Museum =

Teapot museum in Shanghai, China

The Sihai Teapot Museum is a private museum dedicated to teapots located in Jiading District, Shanghai. It is the first private museum to open in modern Shanghai. The Sihai Teapot Museum was founded in 1992 by Xu Sihai, an expert in purple clay teapots and Yixing ware teapots.

In 2009, Xu Sihai also established the Hundred Buddhas Garden, a 3.07-hectare complex encompassing the original Sihai Teapot Museum, as well as the nearby China Tea God Museum and a tea processing mill.
