= Liuwan Museum of Ancient Painted Pottery =

Ceramics museum in Qinghai, China

Coordinates: 36°26′45″N 102°33′37″E

The Liuwan Museum of Ancient Painted Pottery (Chinese: 柳灣彩陶博物館) is a ceramics museum located in Ledu District, Qinghai Province, China. The museum opened in 2004 and has a collection of 37,925 objects, many of which are from the Neolithic period from Liwan tombs. It is the largest painted pottery museum in China.

== See also ==
- List of museums in China
