= Bust of Adam Mickiewicz =

Monument in Warsaw, Poland

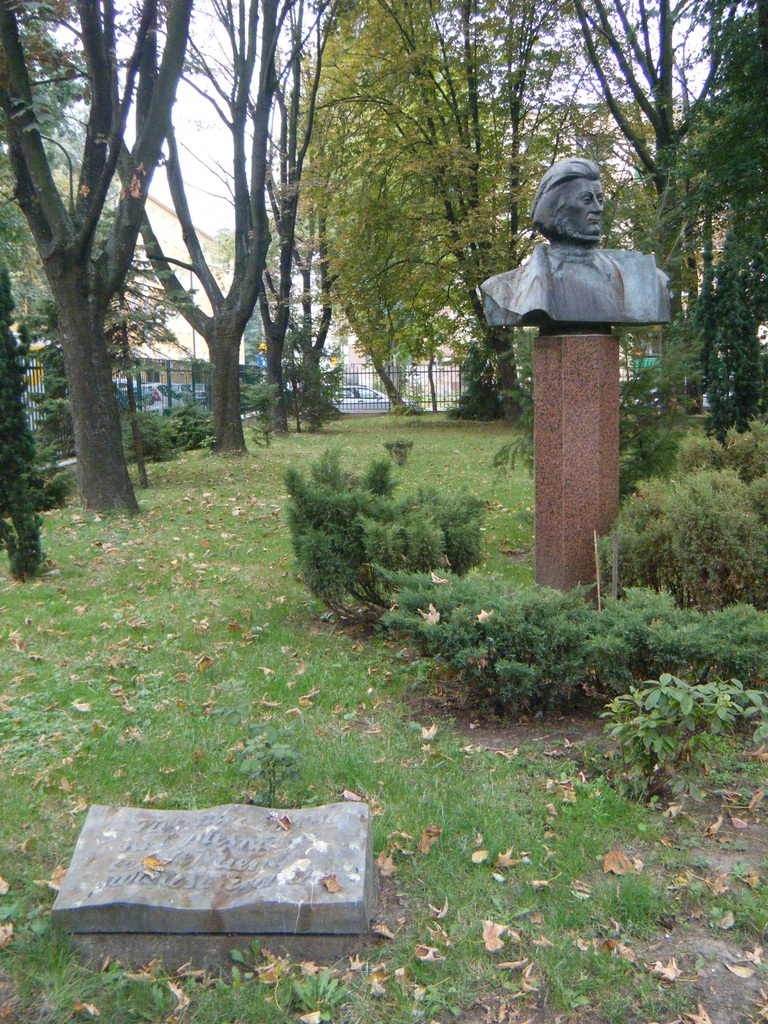
- The monument in 2012.
- Interactive map of Bust of Adam Mickiewicz
- Location: 59 Saska Street, Praga-South, Warsaw, Poland
- Coordinates: 52°13′46″N 21°03′39″E
- Designer: Eugeniusz Kozak
- Type: Bust
- Material: Bronze
- Opening date: 2000
- Dedicated to: Adam Mickiewicz

The bust of Adam Mickiewicz (Polish pronunciation: [ˈa.dam mit͡sˈkʲ.ɛvit͡ʂ]; Polish: Popiersie Adama Mickiewicza) is a monument in the city of Warsaw, Poland, located within the neighbourhood of Saska Kępa in the Praga-South district. It is placed near Kubańska Street in the courtyard of the 4th Adam Mickiewicz General Education High School at 59 Saska Street. Made of bronze, it depicts a bust of Adam Mickiewicz (1798–1855), a 19th-century poet, writer, and political activist. It was designed by Eugeniusz Kozak, and unveiled in 2000.

== History ==
The monument was designed by Eugeniusz Koza, and unveiled in 2000, and unveiled in front of the 4th Adam Mickiewicz General Education High School at 59 Saska Street in Warsaw, Poland. It was dedicated to Adam Mickiewicz (1798–1855), a 19th-century poet, writer, and political activist.

== Design ==
The monument consists of a bronze bust of Adam Mickiewicz placed on a pedestal. A stone sculpture of an open book is placed on a ground in front of the monument. It bares a Polish inscription which reads: "Pieśniarz to jest nad pieśniarze, co z tej ziemi świętość zrobił". It translates to "He is the singer of singers, who turned this land into a holy place".
