= Oranżada =

Polish soft drink

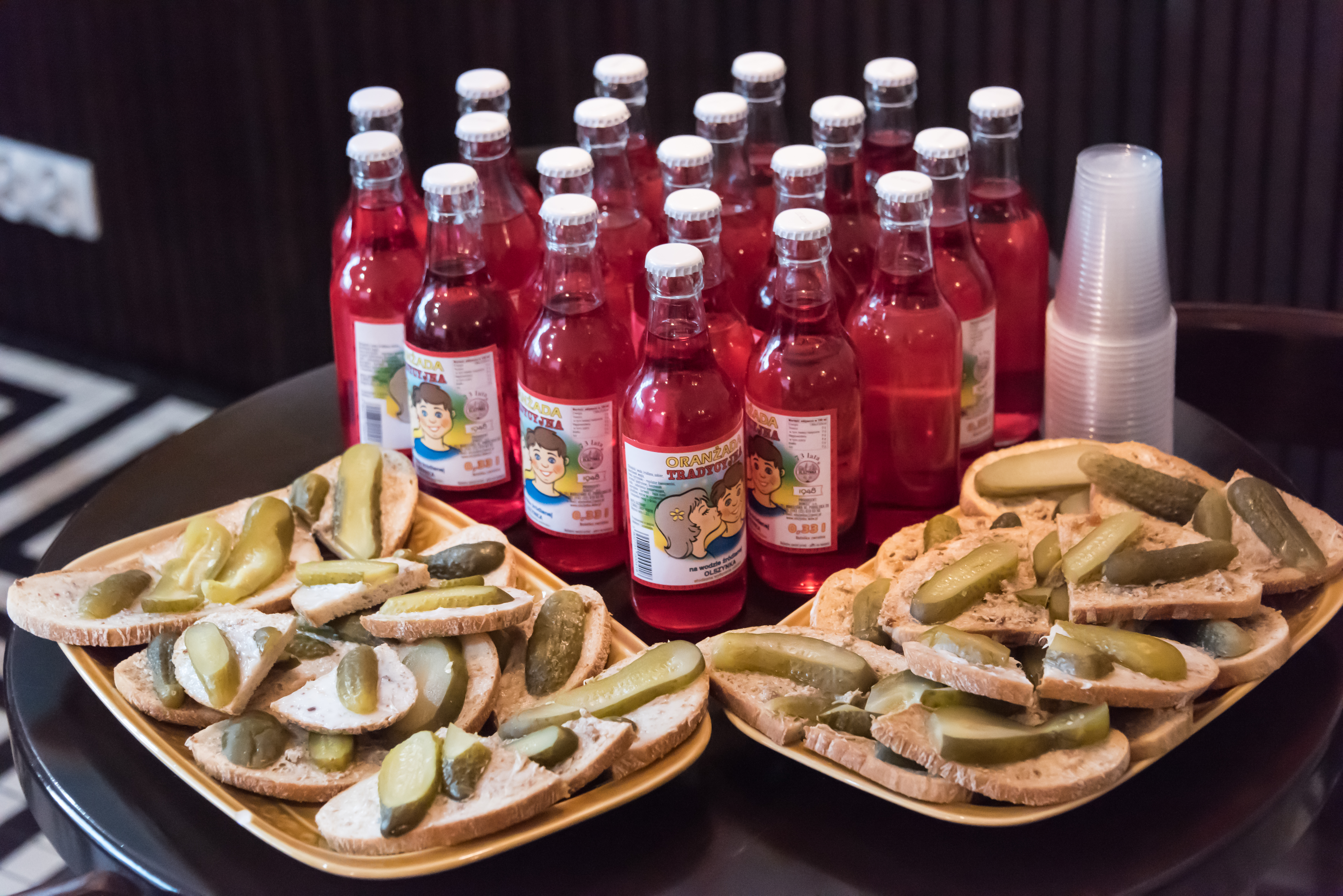
Traditional bottles of Ronisz oranżada czerwona displayed at a museum alongside kanapki.

Oranżada (pronounced [ɔ.ranˈʐa.da]) is a traditional Polish carbonated soft drink, historically characterized by its orange or citrus flavor and its status as a ubiquitous cultural staple from the Polish People's Republic era.

== History ==
The origins of the beverage come from the 18th century when carbonated orange soft drinks made of water, sugar, and orange syrup were introduced from France.

The drink's modern identity was forged during the Polish People's Republic era. Due to the high cost and scarcity of imported citrus fruits under the socialist economy, manufacturers developed a domestic alternative. This led to the creation of red oranżada, a colored soft drink flavored with vegetable extracts and juices, most notably black carrot juice.

During this period, oranżada became the most popular carbonated drink in Poland, primarily because other Western brands like Coca-Cola or Pepsi were either unavailable or prohibitively expensive. It was famously sold in glass bottles with swing-top stoppers and later in plastic bags with a straw known as oranżada w woreczku.

The company Ronisz was established in 1948 by Antoni Niszcz and Czesław Romaniuk in Grochów, which became one of Poland's most enduring private beverage manufacturers of oranżada. In 1980, the plant relocated to the Praga-Południe district in Warsaw on the edge of the Olszynka Grochowska nature reserve where it continues to produce traditional white and red oranżada, as well as lemon and orange sodas.
