= Abgineh Museum of Tehran =

Museum in Tehran, Iran

Coordinates: 35.69345°N 51.41507°E

Glassware and Ceramic Museum of Iran
- موزهٔ آبگینه و سفالینه ایران; Muze ye Abgineh va Sofalineh ye Irān
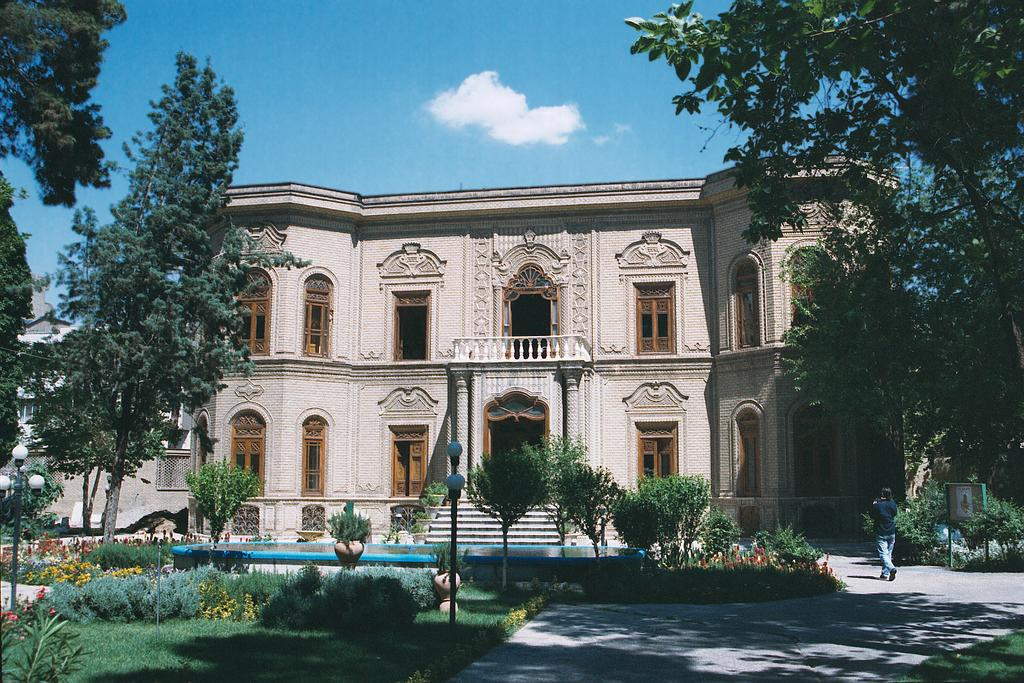
- Glassware and Ceramic Museum of Iran
- Established: 1937
- Location: Tehran, Iran
- Type: Glassware and Ceramics museum
- Director: Navid Salehvand
- Owner: ICHTO

The Glassware and Ceramic Museum of Iran (Persian: موزهٔ آبگینه و سفالینه ایران, Muze-ye Abgineh va Sofalineh-ye Irān) or simply Abgineh Museum (Persian: موزهٔ آبگینه, Muze-ye Abgineh) is located at 30 Tir Street (formerly known as Ghavam al-Saltaneh Street), in Tehran, Iran. The museum contains more than 1000 art pieces from Prehistory to recent times.

== History ==
The mansion was the private residence of longtime Prime Minister Ahmad Qavam from 1921 until 1951. The complex was also the Embassy of Egypt for seven years. In the late 1970s, it was turned into a museum by the order of Empress Farah Pahlavi.

== Gallery ==
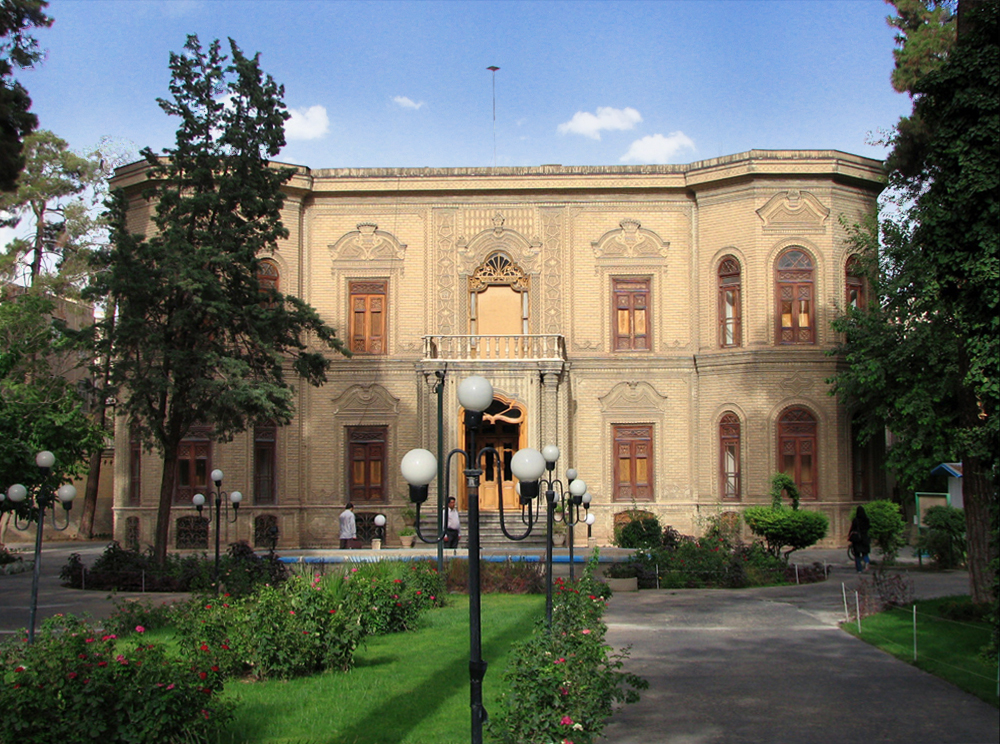
Exterior view of the building

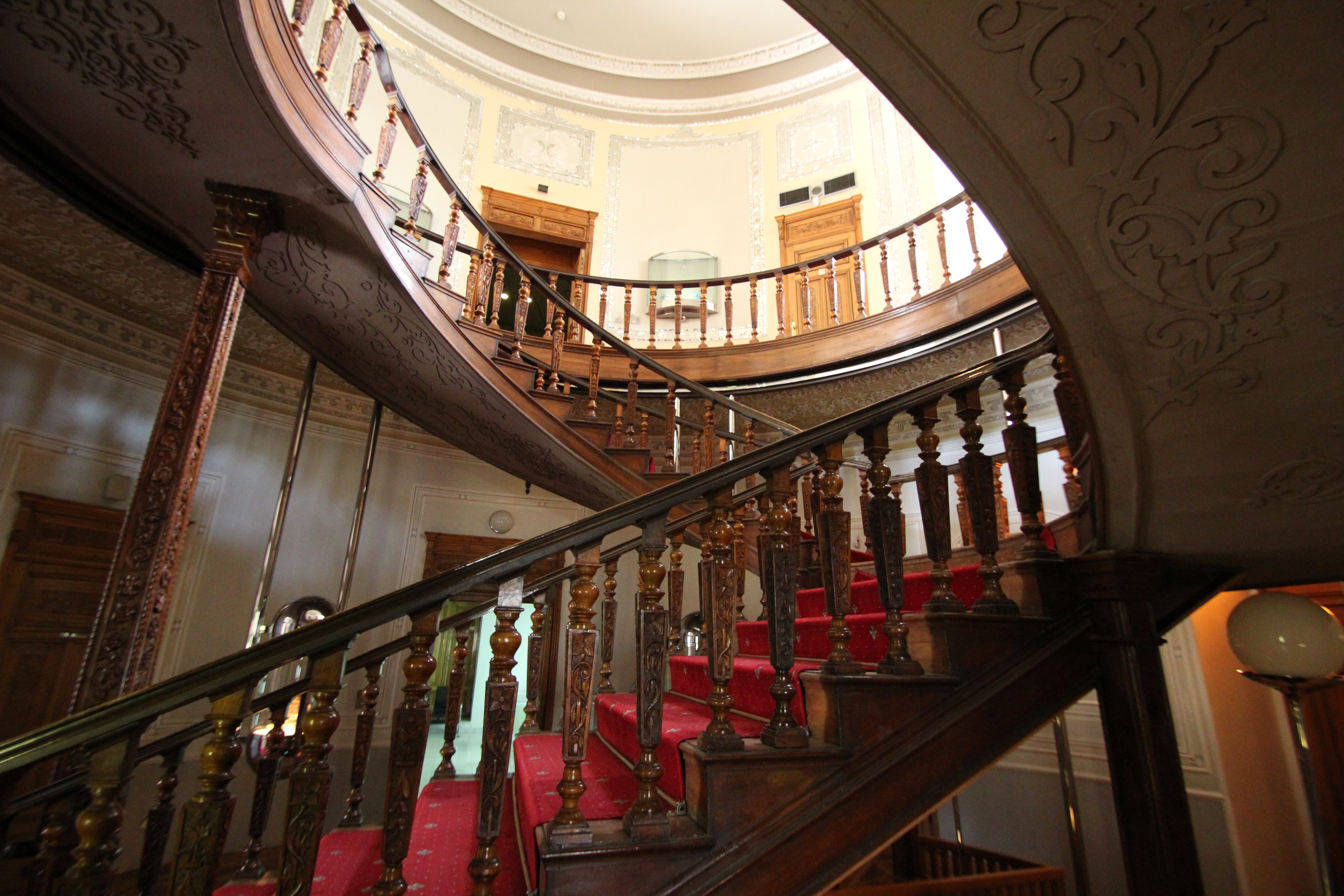
Interior stairs

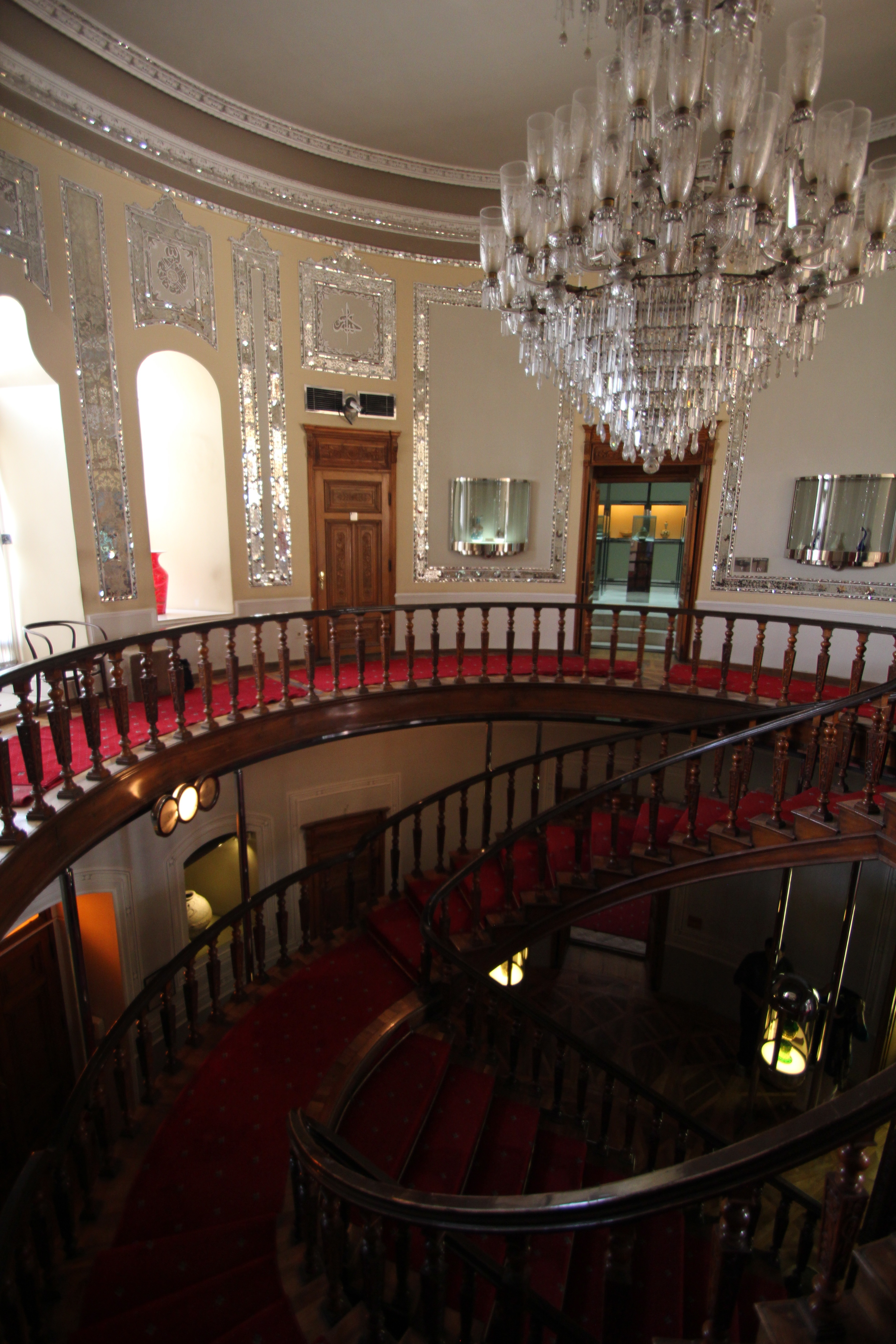
Second floor and the mirror hall with Ayeneh-kari decorations

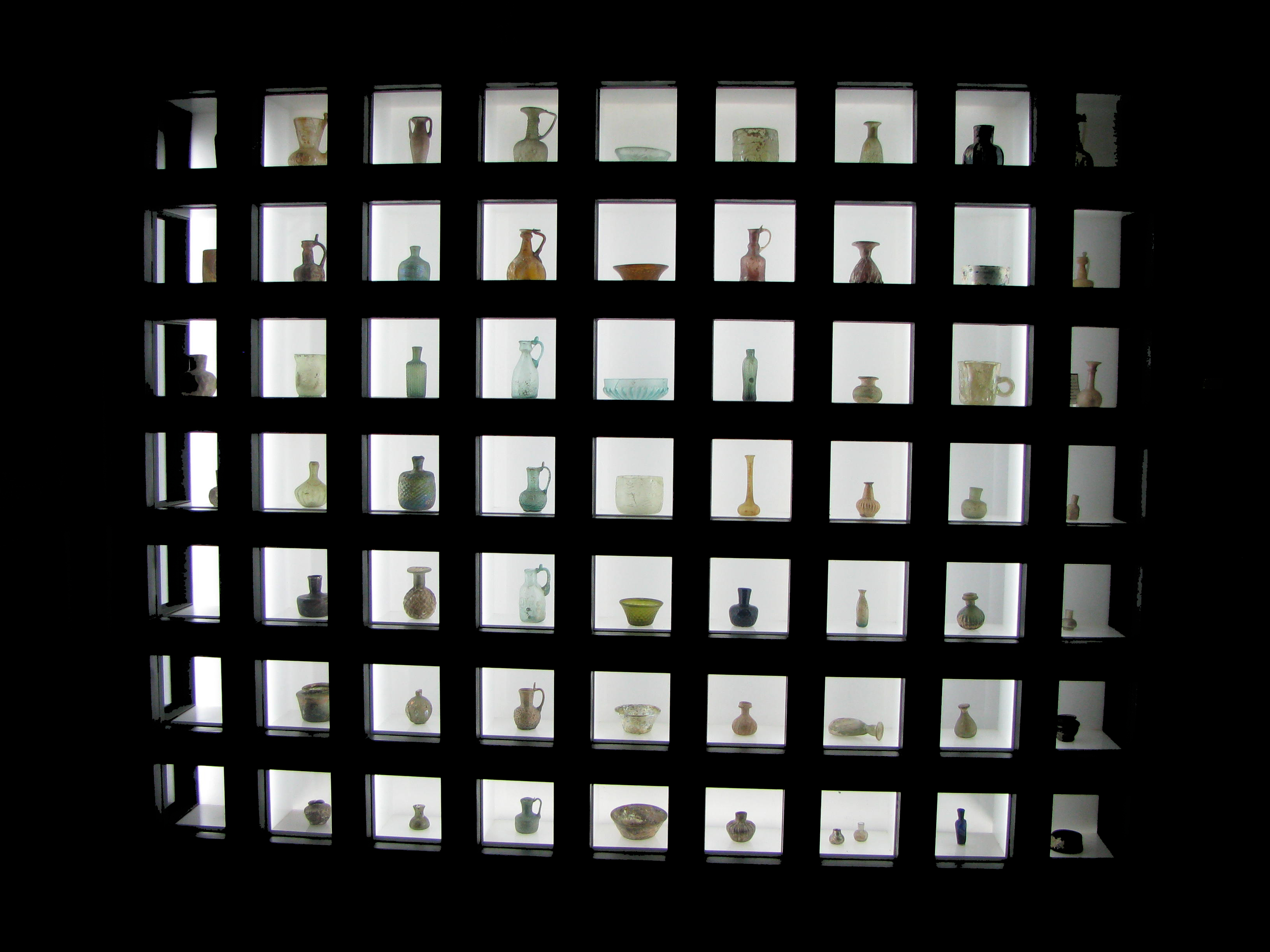
Showcases

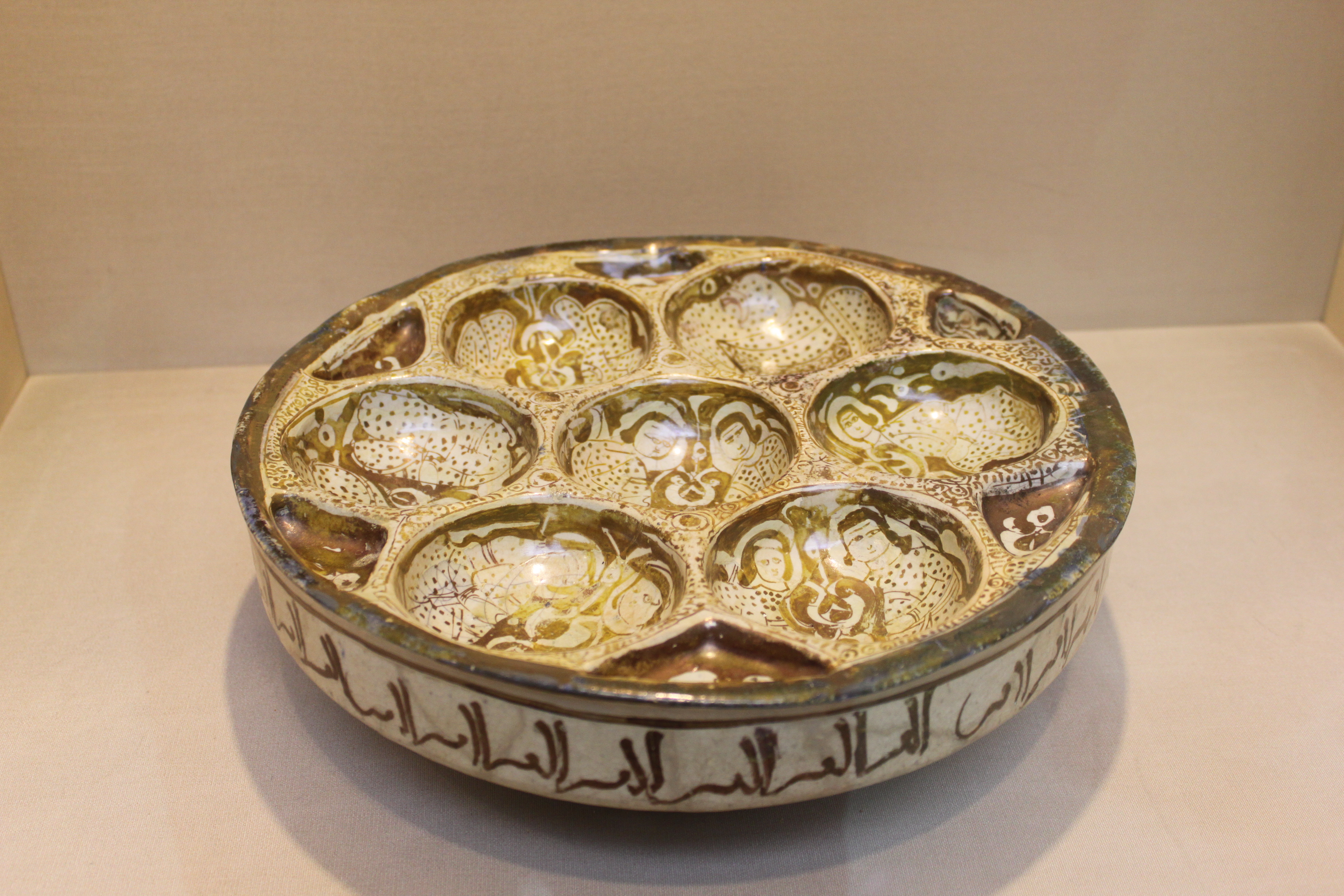
Ceramic compound vessel - 12–13th century - Gorgan

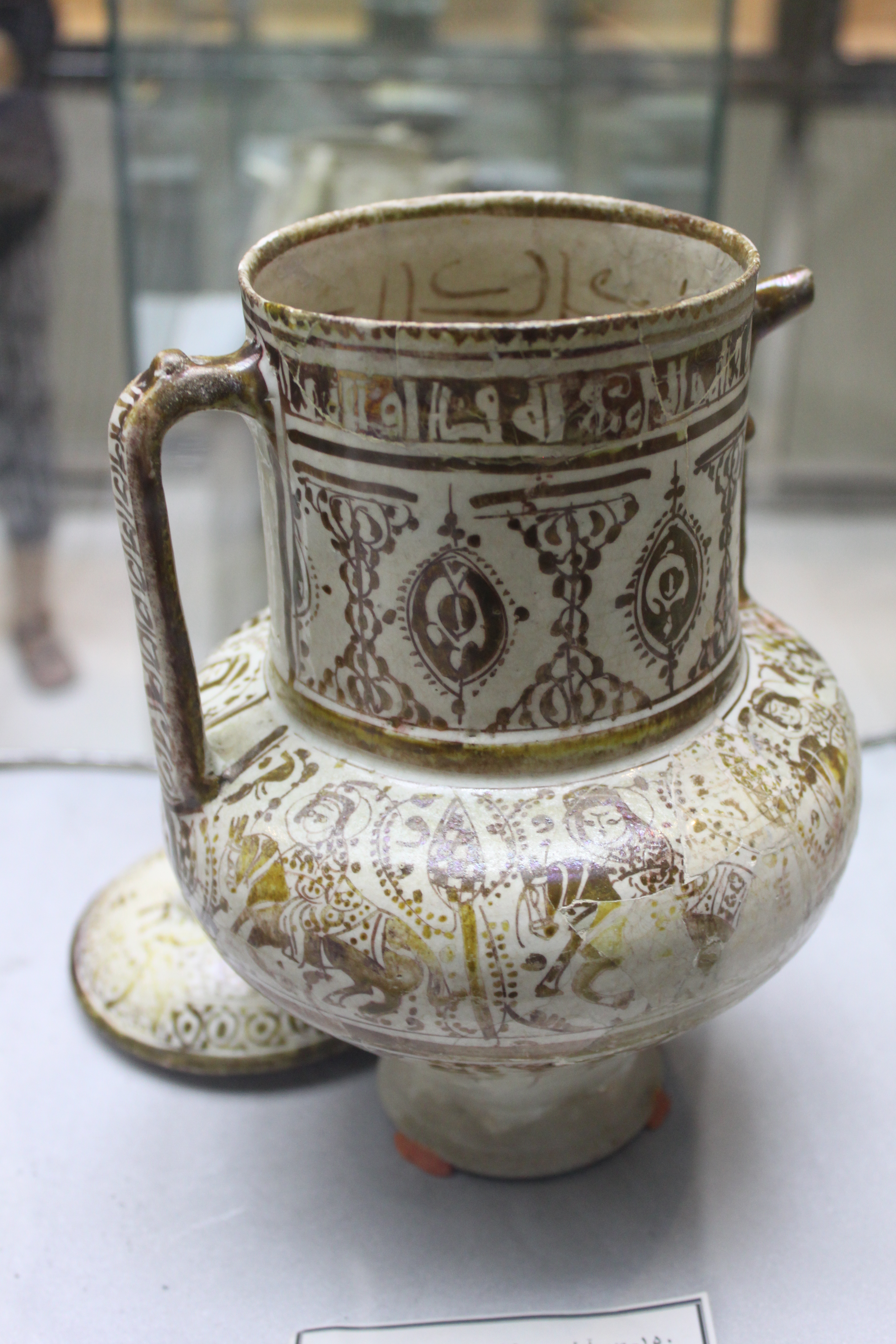
Ceramic jug - 13th century - Gorgan

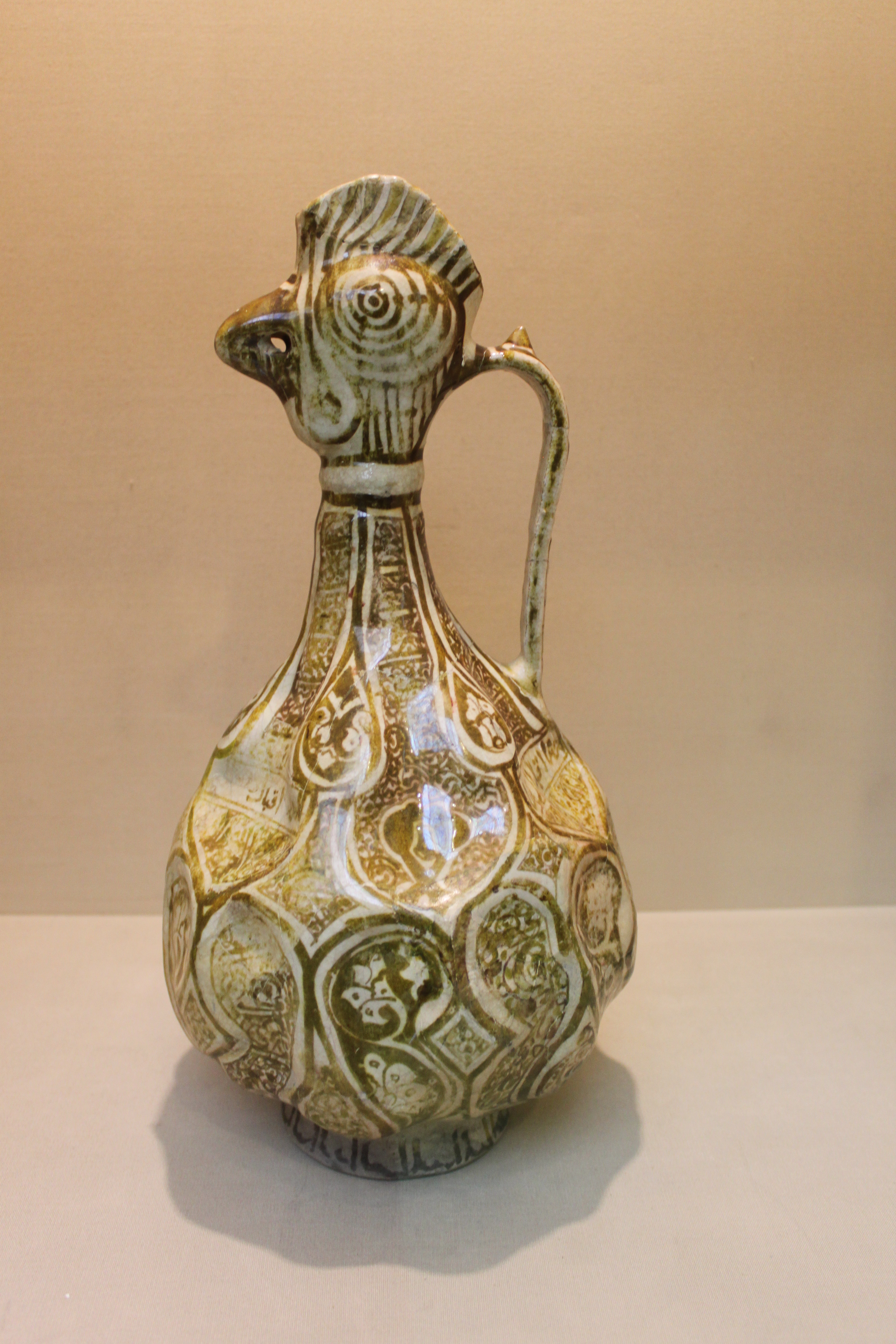
Ceramic ewer - 13th century - Kashan

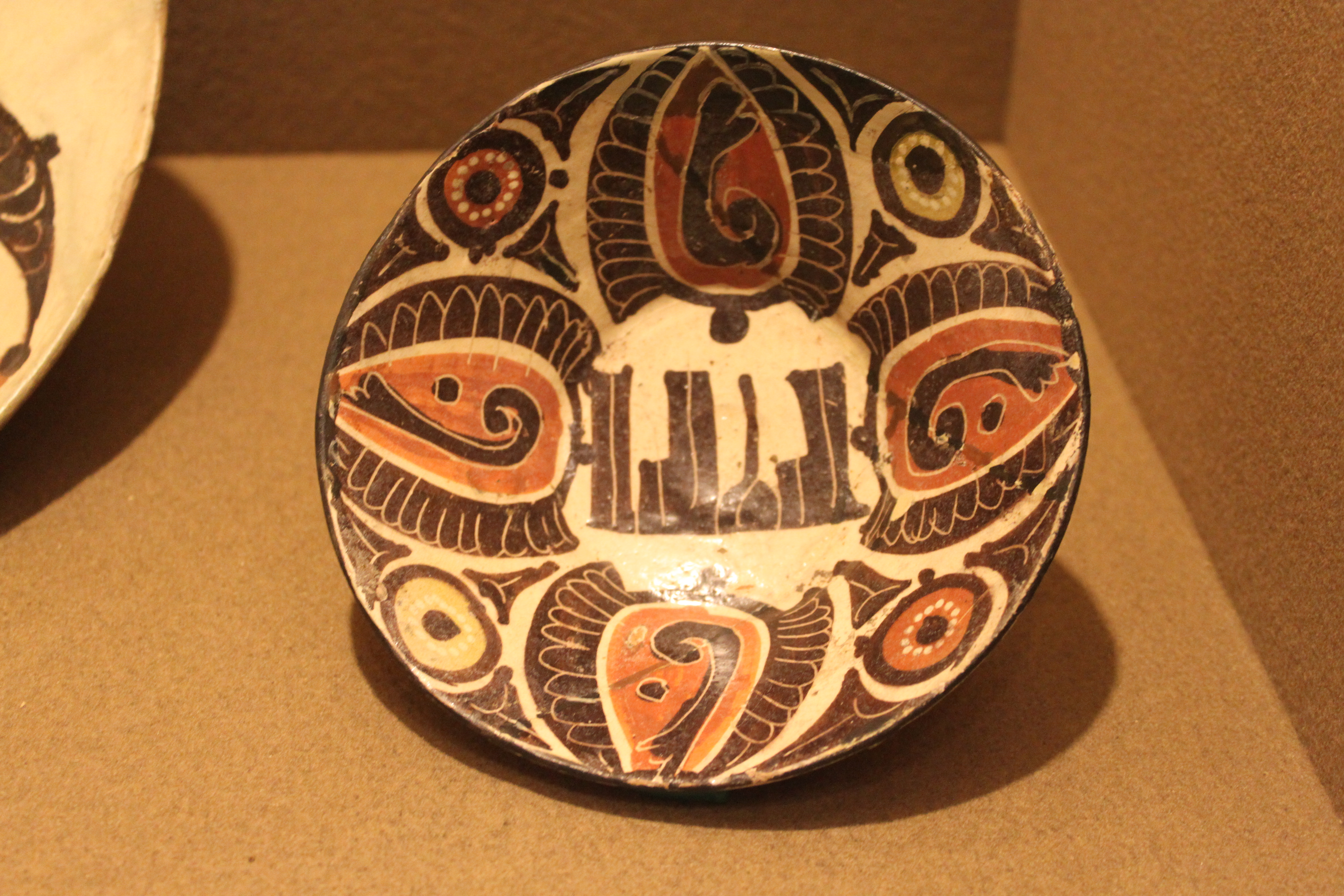
Ceramic bowl - 11th century - Nishapur

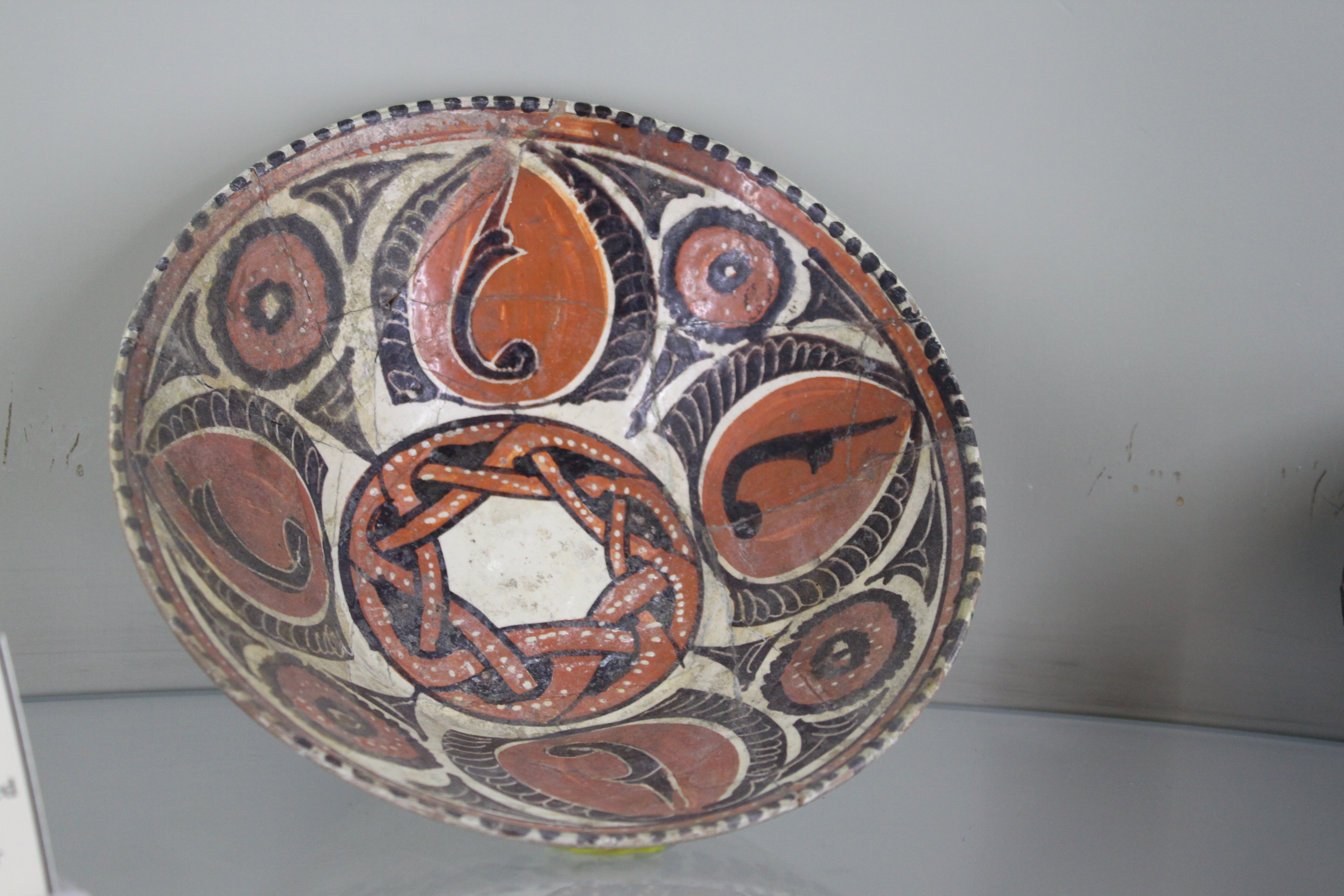
Ceramic bowl - 10–11th century - Nishapur

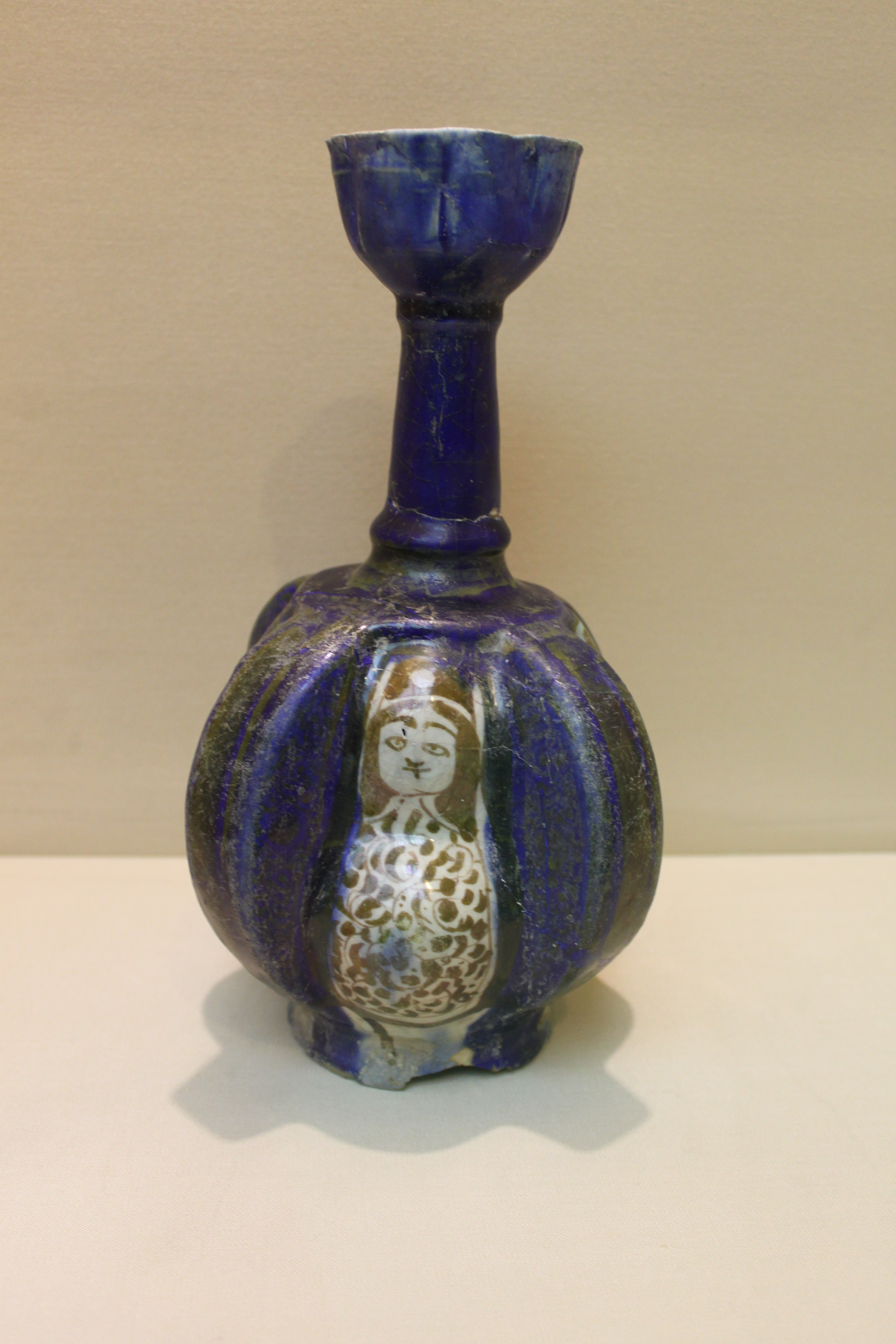
Ceramic pitcher - 12–13th century - Ray

== See also ==
- Ahmad Qavam
- National Museum of Iran
- Museum of the Islamic Era
- Hans Hollein
