= Xu Sihai =

Chinese ceramist (c.1946–2020)

Xu Sihai (c. 1946 – June 5, 2020) was a Chinese teapot creator, artisan, collector, and curator. Xu was an expert and authority on purple clay teapots, also known as the Yixing clay teapot. In 1992, Xu founded the Sihai Teapot Museum, the first private museum established in modern Shanghai.

== Biography ==
Xu was born in Yancheng, Jiangsu province. He moved south to the city of Shanghai when he was 10-years old. He joined the People's Liberation Army when he was 23 years old and was sent to North Vietnam during the 1960s. Xu first became interested in creating purple clay teapots while still enlisted in the military. After leaving the army, Xu returned to Shanghai with a truck full of purple clay teapots he created.

Xu continued making purple clay teapots during the 1980s. His creation, a teapot called "Summer," won a national competition in 1985. That particular teapot was later acquired by the Asian Art Museum in San Francisco. His first solo exhibition of his teapots took place in Singapore in 1989.

Examples of his teapots are now displayed in both Chinese and international museums.

In 1992, Xu Sihai opened the Sihai Teapot Museum, the first private museum in Shanghai. He also opened "A Hundred Buddhas Garden" in 2009, a 3.07-hectare complex which encompasses the original Sihai Teapot Museum, as well as the China Tea God Museum and a tea processing factory located in the city's Jiading Districts Zhenxin neighborhood.

Xu Sihai died on June 5, 2020, at the age of 74.
