= List of museums of Greek and Roman antiquities =

This is a list of museums with major collections of Greek and Roman antiquities.

1. Naples Archaeological Museum, Naples, Italy
  130,000 objects
2. State Hermitage, St Petersburg, Russia
  106,000 objects (Misleading collection, includes many objects from ancient settlements on the Northern Black Sea coast)
3. British Museum, London, UK
  100,000 objects
4. National Archaeological Museum, Athens, Greece
  100,000 objects
5. Antikensammlung Berlin, (Held at the Altes Museum, Neues Museum and Pergamon Museum), Berlin, Germany
  60,000 objects
6. Istanbul Archaeology Museum, Istanbul, Turkey
  53,000 objects (Misleading Collection. Total collection size: 1 million objects of which 800,000 coins, 75,000 books, 75,000 Ancient Near East cuneiform tablets, 2000 enamels and various Ancient Near Eastern objects)
7. Archaeological Museum of Thessaloniki, Thessaloniki, Greece
  50,000 objects
8. Musée du Louvre, Paris, France
  45,000 objects
9. Getty Villa, Malibu, USA
  44,000 objects
10. Metropolitan Museum of Art, New York, USA
  35,000 objects
11. University of Pennsylvania Museum of Archaeology and Anthropology, Pennsylvania, USA
  30,000 objects
12. Museum of Fine Arts, Boston, USA
  18,000 objects (Misleading collection, includes Nubian and Ancient Near East collections)
