= Museu de Cerâmica (Caldas da Rainha) =

Ceramics museum in Portugal

Coordinates: 39.3996°N 9.1304°W

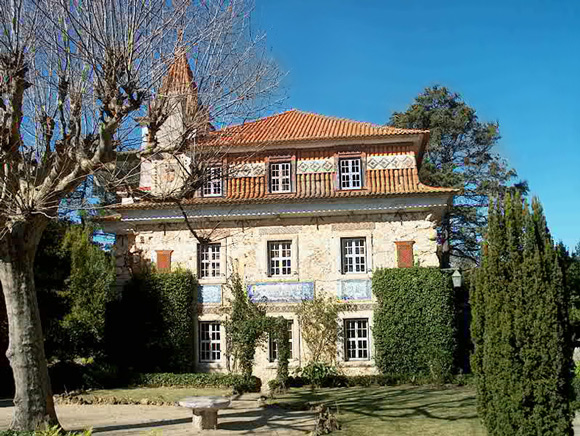
Palacete Visconde de Sacavém, Caldas da Rainha.

The Museu de Cerâmica, located in Quinta Visconde de Sacavém, in the city of Caldas da Rainha, Portugal, is a ceramics museum. It shows a permanent exhibition in its 19th-century romantic-style manor house surrounded by gardens, that consists of ceramics of different ages and styles.

The Quinta, or Estate, was built in the 1890s by the 2nd Visconde de Sacavém, José Joaquim Pinto da Silva, a collector, ceramicist and important patron of ceramicists in Caldas da Rainha. A workshop, the Atelier Cerâmico, was set up on the Estate by the Visconde de Sacavém and operated between 1892 and 1896, under the direction of the Austrian sculptor José Füller.

== The collections ==
The museum's various collections are representative of ceramic production in Caldas da Rainha as well as other centres in Portugal and abroad. They include examples of what is known as the "archaic" Caldas ceramics from the 17th and 18th century and the first half of the 20th century.

The anthropomorphic household items of the potter, Maria dos Cacos (died 1853) are particularly noteworthy, as is the work of Manuel Mafra (1829–1905), the ceramicist who enjoyed the patronage of the royal consort, Ferdinand of Coburg. The pieces by Rafael Bordalo Pinheiro are one of the most representative groups of the work of the grand master of Caldas ceramics and bear witness to the productivity of the Caldas da Rainha Faience Factory between 1884 and 1905.

Also on exhibition is the faience from the Rato Factory (1767–1779), as well as sculpture, miniatures and 19–20th century ceramics from the main Portuguese factories: Bandeira, Rocha Soares, Gaia, Darque, Barcelos, Ratinho, Juncal, Estremoz, Sacavém, Viúva Lamego, Vista Alegre, Aleluia and Santana. Foreign production includes ceramics from France, Spain, Italy, the Netherlands, Belgium, and China.

Contemporary ceramics are represented with work from artists such as Artigas, Llorens Gardy, Júlio Pomar, Manuel Cargaleiro e Cecília de Sousa. There is also a collection of glazed tile work which is made up of around 1200 tiles and 40 panels, including Portuguese, Hispanic-moorish and duch examples from the 16th to the 20th century.
