= Insulator Museum =

Museum in Komaki, Aichi, Japan

- 碍子博物館
- Location within Aichi Prefecture Location within Japan
- Location: Komaki, Japan
- Coordinates: 35°17′N 136°56′E
- Type: Ceramics museum
- Collection size: 7020 items
- Architect: Taniguchi Yoshirō
- Owner: NGK Insulators
- Website: www.ngk.co.jp/english/about/

The Insulator Museum of the firm NGK Insulators, located in Komaki, Japan, is the only museum of porcelain insulators in the world.

== History ==
The museum contains some unique items, including a "pin insulator for communication" manufactured in 1875 that is believed to be the oldest domestic Japanese insulator. It has "approximately 5,000 pieces of insulators and maintenance tools from 21 countries... and 57 manufacturers." About 300 pieces are on display at any one time. It also has a detailed and informative display on the material, processes and applications.

NGK Insulators is one of the world's largest manufacturer of electrical porcelain, with a number of plants in different countries. Due to the company's significant production of ceramic items, its annual sales exceed $USD3.5 billion. NGK Insulators has been producing porcelain continuously for nearly 100 years, and, sometime in the mid 1980s, its total output surpassed 150 million porcelain units.
