= Private museum =

Museum owned by a private person or organization

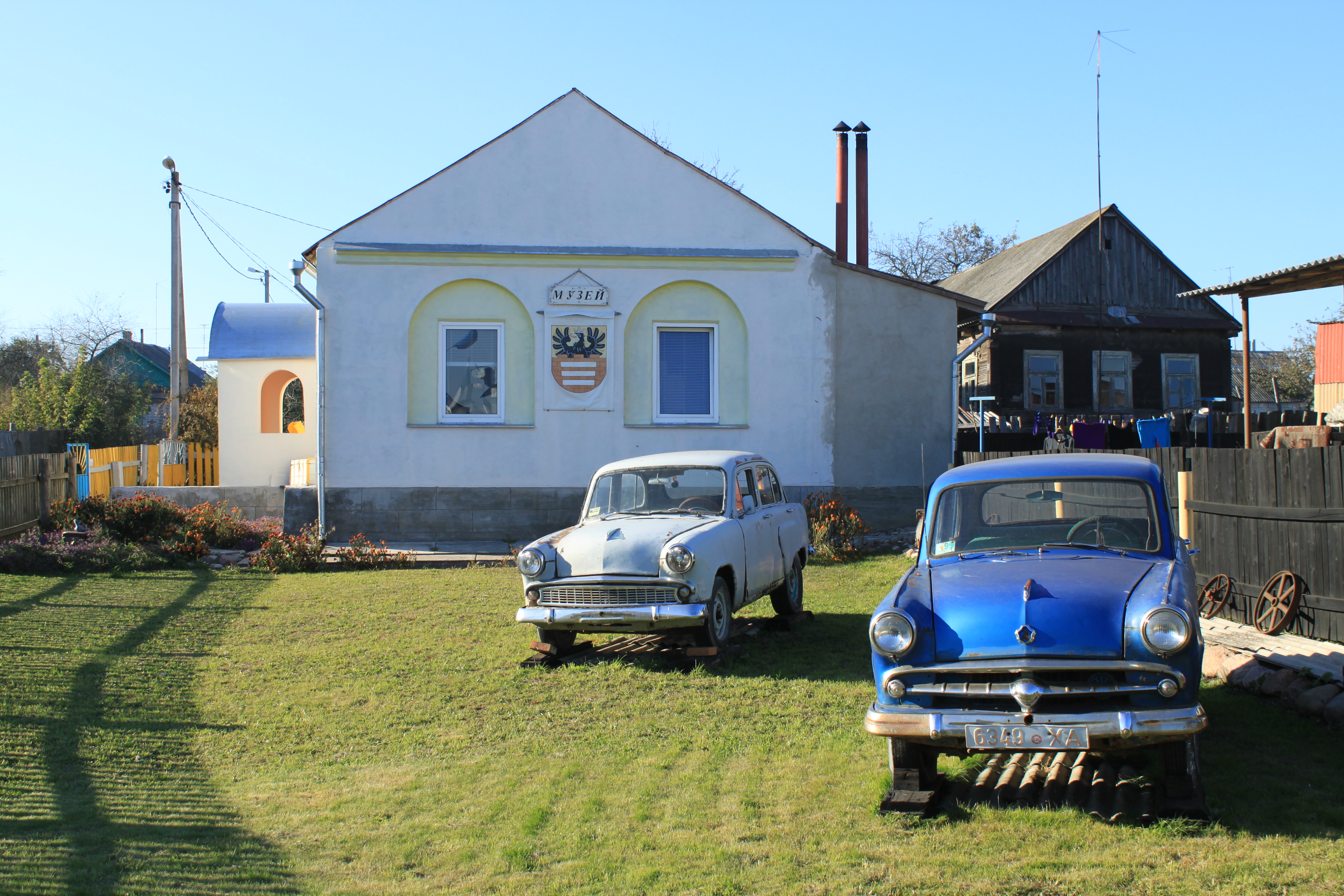
A private museum in Mir, Belarus

A private museum is a museum that is owned and funded by an individual or private organization, rather than by the government. It may operate under a for-profit or nonprofit model.

== Overview ==
Unlike a public or governmental museum, a scientific monitoring and systematic documentation are not always guaranteed. Therefore, a private museum has relevance for historical research only if it complements the national collections. Under certain circumstances, a private museum also receives funding from the state, so that a comparison with public museums is possible.

Many, especially smaller, private museums do not meet the requirements of the International Council of Museums (ICOM). The main reason is that qualified personnel are not sufficiently available or can hardly be financed and therefore often only very limited opening times may be offered.

Often private museums focus on entertainment and have a tourism focus. Their collections are on display for the public to enjoy.
