= List of chlorinated propanes =

This is a list of the 29 molecules of chlorinated propane in order of number of chlorine atoms.

== Monochloro ==
- 1-Chloropropane
- 2-Chloropropane

== Dichloro ==
- 1,1-Dichloropropane
- 1,2-Dichloropropane
- 1,3-Dichloropropane
- 2,2-Dichloropropane

== Trichloro ==
- 1,1,1-Trichloropropane
- 1,2,3-Trichloropropane
- 1,2,2-Trichloropropane
- 1,1,2-Trichloropropane
- 1,1,3-Trichloropropane

== Tetrachloro ==
- 1,1,1,2-Tetrachloropropane
- 1,1,1,3-Tetrachloropropane
- 1,1,2,2-Tetrachloropropane
- 1,1,2,3-Tetrachloropropane
- 1,1,3,3-Tetrachloropropane
- 1,2,2,3-tetrachloropropane

== Pentachloro ==
- 1,1,1,2,2-Pentachloropropane
- 1,1,1,2,3-Pentachloropropane
- 1,1,1,3,3-Pentachloropropane
- 1,1,2,2,3-Pentachloropropane
- 1,1,2,3,3-Pentachloropropane

== Hexachloro ==
- 1,1,1,2,2,3-Hexachloropropane
- 1,1,1,2,3,3-Hexachloropropane
- 1,1,1,3,3,3-Hexachloropropane
- 1,1,2,2,3,3-Hexachloropropane

== Heptachloro ==
- 1,1,1,2,2,3,3-Heptachloropropane
- 1,1,1,2,3,3,3-Heptachloropropane

== Octachloro ==
- Octachloropropane
