= Dichloropropane =

Dichloropropane can refer to any of several chemical compounds:

- 1,1-Dichloropropane
- 1,2-Dichloropropane
- 1,3-Dichloropropane
- 2,2-Dichloropropane

== See also ==
- Dichloropropene
