= C3H6Cl2 =

The molecular formula C_{3}H_{6}Cl_{2} (molar mass: 112.98 g/mol, exact mass: 111.9847 u) may refer to:

- 1,2-Dichloropropane
- 1,3-Dichloropropane
- 2,2-Dichloropropane
