= Sulfur compounds =

Chemical compounds with a sulfur atom

A sample of calcium sulfate, a compound of sulfur

Sulfur compounds are chemical compounds formed with the element sulfur (S). Common oxidation states of sulfur range from −2 to +6. Sulfur forms stable compounds with all elements except the noble gases.

== Electron transfer reactions ==
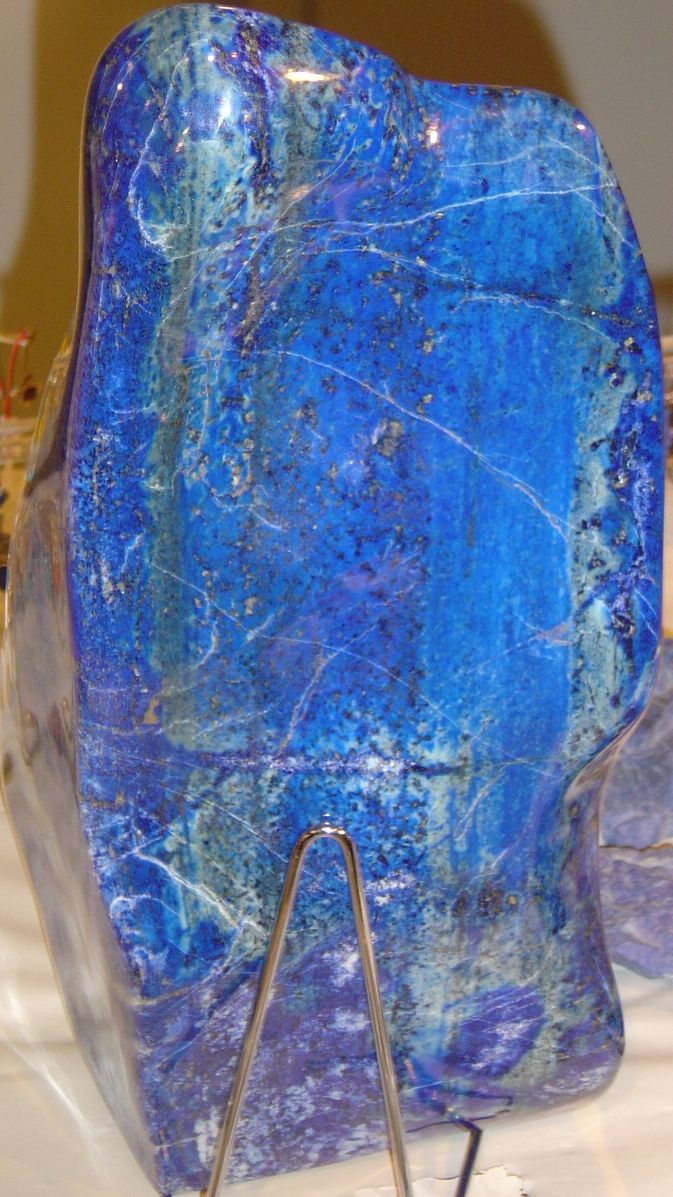
Lapis lazuli owes its blue color to a trisulfur radical anion (S^{−}_{3})

Sulfur polycations, S_{8}^{2+}, S_{4}^{2+} and S_{19}^{2+} are produced when sulfur is reacted with oxidising agents in a strongly acidic solution. The colored solutions produced by dissolving sulfur in oleum were first reported as early as 1804 by C.F. Bucholz, but the cause of the color and the structure of the polycations involved was only determined in the late 1960s. S_{8}^{2+} is deep blue, S_{4}^{2+} is yellow and S_{19}^{2+} is red.

Reduction of sulfur gives various polysulfides with the formula S_{x}^{2-}, many of which have been obtained in crystalline form. Illustrative is the production of sodium tetrasulfide:

4 Na + S_{8} → 2 Na_{2}S_{4}

Some of these dianions dissociate to give radical anions, such as S_{3}^{−} gives the blue color of the rock lapis lazuli.

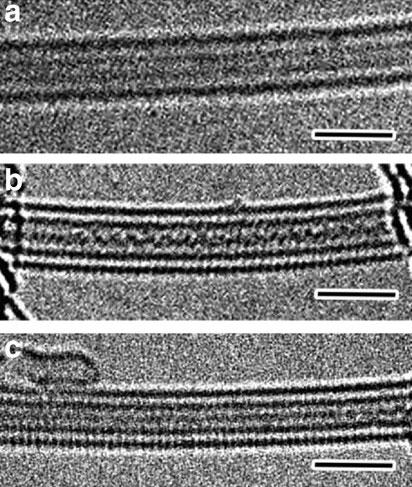
Two parallel sulfur chains grown inside a single-wall carbon nanotube (CNT, a). Zig-zag (b) and straight (c) S chains inside double-wall CNTs

This reaction highlights a distinctive property of sulfur: its ability to catenate (bind to itself by formation of chains). Protonation of these polysulfide anions produces the polysulfanes, H_{2}S_{x} where x = 2, 3, and 4. Ultimately, reduction of sulfur produces sulfide salts:

16 Na + S_{8} → 8 Na_{2}S

The interconversion of these species is exploited in the sodium–sulfur battery.

== Hydrogen sulfide ==
Treatment of sulfur with hydrogen gives hydrogen sulfide. When dissolved in water, hydrogen sulfide is mildly acidic:

H_{2}S ⇌ HS^{−} + H^{+}

Hydrogen sulfide gas and the hydrosulfide anion are extremely toxic to mammals, due to their inhibition of the oxygen-carrying capacity of hemoglobin and certain cytochromes in a manner analogous to cyanide and azide.

== Oxides ==
The two principal sulfur oxides are obtained by burning sulfur:

S + O_{2} → SO_{2} (sulfur dioxide)
2 SO_{2} + O_{2} → 2 SO_{3} (sulfur trioxide)

Many other sulfur oxides are observed including the sulfur-rich oxides sulfur monoxide, disulfur monoxide, disulfur dioxides, and higher oxides containing peroxo groups.

== Halides ==
Sulfur reacts with fluorine to give the highly reactive sulfur tetrafluoride and the highly inert sulfur hexafluoride. Whereas fluorine gives S(IV) and S(VI) compounds, chlorine gives S(II) and S(I) derivatives. Thus, sulfur dichloride, disulfur dichloride, and higher chlorosulfanes arise from the chlorination of sulfur. Sulfuryl chloride and chlorosulfuric acid are derivatives of sulfuric acid; thionyl chloride (SOCl_{2}) is a common reagent in organic synthesis. Sulfur halides are precursors to a variety of metal complexes.

=== Pseudohalides ===
Sulfur oxidizes cyanide and sulfite to give thiocyanate and thiosulfate, respectively.

== Metal sulfides ==
Sulfur reacts with many metals. Electropositive metals give polysulfide salts. Copper, zinc and silver are tarnished by sulfur. Although many metal sulfides are known, most are prepared by high temperature reactions of the elements. Sulfide minerals contain the sulfide (S^{2-}) or disulfide (S_{2}^{2-}) anions. Typical examples are:

- Acanthite Ag_{2}S
- Chalcocite Cu_{2}S
- Galena PbS
- Sphalerite ZnS
- Chalcopyrite CuFeS_{2}
- Millerite NiS
- Cinnabar HgS
- Stibnite Sb_{2}S_{3}
- Pyrite FeS_{2}
- Molybdenite MoS_{2}

== Organic compounds ==
Illustrative organosulfur compounds

Allicin, a chemical compound in garlic

(R)-cysteine, an amino acid containing a thiol group

(S)-Methionine, an amino acid containing a thioether

Diphenyl disulfide, a representative disulfide

Perfluorooctanesulfonic acid, a surfactant

Dibenzothiophene, a component of crude oil

Penicillin, an antibiotic where "R" is the variable group

Some of the main classes of sulfur-containing organic compounds include the following:

- Thiols or mercaptans (so called because they capture mercury as chelators) are the sulfur analogs of alcohols; treatment of thiols with base gives thiolate ions.
- Thioethers are the sulfur analogs of ethers.
- Sulfonium ions have three groups attached to a cationic sulfur center. Dimethylsulfoniopropionate (DMSP) is one such compound, important in the marine organic sulfur cycle.
- Sulfoxides and sulfones are thioethers with one and two oxygen atoms attached to the sulfur atom, respectively. The simplest sulfoxide, dimethyl sulfoxide, is a common solvent; a common sulfone is sulfolane.
- Sulfonic acids are used in many detergents.

Compounds with carbon–sulfur multiple bonds are uncommon, an exception being carbon disulfide, a volatile colorless liquid that is structurally similar to carbon dioxide. It is used as a reagent to make the polymer rayon and many organosulfur compounds. Unlike carbon monoxide, carbon monosulfide is stable only as an extremely dilute gas, found between solar systems.

Organosulfur compounds are responsible for some of the unpleasant odors of decaying organic matter. They are widely known as the odorant in domestic natural gas, garlic odor, and skunk spray. Not all organic sulfur compounds smell unpleasant at all concentrations: the sulfur-containing monoterpenoid (grapefruit mercaptan) in small concentrations is the characteristic scent of grapefruit, but has a generic thiol odor at larger concentrations. Sulfur mustard, a potent vesicant, was used in World War I as a disabling agent.

Sulfur–sulfur bonds are a structural component used to stiffen rubber, similar to the disulfide bridges that rigidify proteins. In the most common type of industrial "curing" or hardening and strengthening of natural rubber, elemental sulfur is heated with the rubber to the point that chemical reactions form disulfide bridges between isoprene units of the polymer. This process, patented in 1843, made rubber a major industrial product, especially in automobile tires. Because of the heat and sulfur, the process was named vulcanization, after the Roman god of the forge and volcanism.

== See also ==
- Category:Sulfur compounds
- Oxygen compounds
- Selenium compounds
- Phosphorus compounds
- Chlorine compounds
