= C3H2Cl6 =

The molecular formula C_{3}H_{2}Cl_{6} (molar mass: 250.766 g/mol, exact mass: 247.8288 u) may refer to:

- 1,1,1,3,3,3-Hexachloropropane
- 1,1,2,2,3,3-Hexachloropropane
