= 1,3-DCP =

The chemical abbreviation 1,3-DCP may stand for:

- 1,3-Dichloropropan-2-ol
- 1,3-Dichloropropane
- 1,3-Dichloropropene
