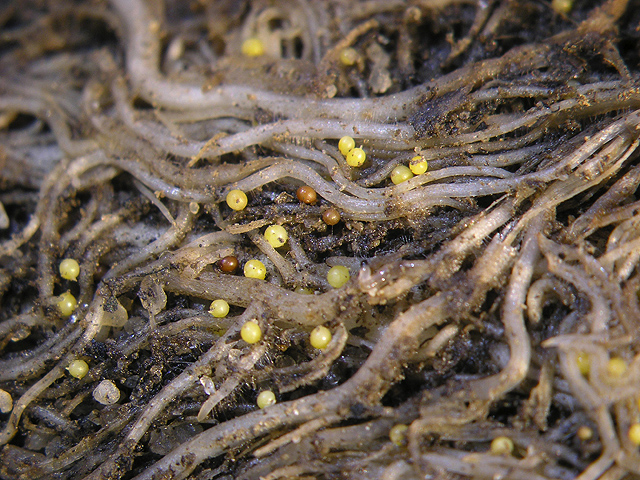
- Golden nematode cysts on potato roots

Scientific classification
- Kingdom: Animalia
- Phylum: Nematoda
- Class: Secernentea
- Order: Tylenchida
- Family: Heteroderidae
- Genus: Globodera
- Species: G. rostochiensis

Binomial name
- Globodera rostochiensis (Wollenweber, 1923)

= Globodera rostochiensis =

Species of roundworm

Globodera rostochiensis, commonly known as the golden nematode, golden eelworm or yellow potato cyst nematode, is a plant pathogenic nematode. It is a pest of plants in the family Solanaceae, primarily infesting potatoes and tomatoes, as well as a variety of other root crops.

== Pathology ==
The golden nematode negatively affects plants of the family Solanaceae by forming cysts on the roots of susceptible species. The cysts, which are composed of dead nematodes, are formed to protect the female's eggs and are typically yellow-brown in color. The first symptoms of infestation are typically poor plant growth, chlorosis, and wilting. Heavy infestations can lead to reduced root systems, water stress, and nutrient deficiencies, while indirect effects of an infestation include premature senescence and increased susceptibility to fungal infections. Symptoms of golden nematode infestation are not unique, and thus identification of the pest is usually performed through testing of soil samples. An infestation may take several years to develop, and can often go unnoticed for between five and seven years. After detection, however, it may take up to thirty years for the pest to be effectively eradicated.

== Distribution ==
The golden nematode, along with the pale cyst nematode, originated in the Andes Mountains of South America. It was first discovered near the city of Rostock, Germany in 1913, although it is thought to have arrived in Europe with imported potatoes sometime during 19th century. It was first discovered in the United States in 1941, in Canada during the 1960s, in India during 1961 and in Mexico during the 1970s. It has also been found in various locations throughout Asia, Africa, and Australia.

== The golden nematode blight on the Saanich Peninsula ==
In the 1960s, the golden nematode was discovered in fields in Saanich, BC, Canada. The response of local and national officials provides an interesting insight into the impact a nematode infestation can have on a community. The golden nematode survives best in climates with relatively moist summers and mild winters. Accordingly, while much of Canada's climate remains too harsh for the pest to flourish, the mild climate of southern Vancouver Island is particularly well suited to a golden nematode infestation. In 1965, Central Saanich became the second area in Canada to be quarantined after the discovery of the golden nematode on a local farm.

The presence of the golden nematode resulted in what biologist John Webster deemed a "bombshell". Almost immediately, the seed potato industry and much of the rest of the agricultural export industry throughout British Columbia was shut down. Specialists from Agriculture Canada surveyed all fields in BC in which potatoes were grown in an attempt to detect and isolate the problem. By 1966, it had been determined that the golden nematode was confined to an approximately 150-acre (60 ha) area of land on the Peninsula. It has been suggested that the pest was transmitted to this relatively sheltered area via plant material imported from Europe, possibly in the 1950s. Agriculture Canada quickly took steps to contain and eradicate the nematode. First, a quarantine zone of approximately 450 acres (180 ha) was established. Farmers were provided with a small financial compensation to help them manage during the proposed eradication process. Following the quarantine, infested lands were fumigated with a pesticide containing 1,3-dichloropropene and dichloropropane at least twice.

By 1980, however, it was clear that attempts to eradicate the nematode had been unsuccessful. As a result, in 1982, the Department of Agriculture enacted the Golden Nematode Order which banned the growing of all nursery stock, root crops, and other plants which might spread the nematode and restricted the movement of any soil and material from the quarantine area.

=== Controversy ===
Financial compensation was arranged for affected farmers. Nevertheless, for many Saanich farmers the quarantine caused considerable and long-lasting financial damage, particularly for those who had invested heavily in formerly lucrative potato industry. In 1991, farmers announced that alternative crops had not been viable replacements for their former crops. Exacerbated by a poor growing season in which some Peninsula farmers lost approximately 40% of their crops, several farms were going into debt while selling their new vegetable crops at a loss. Several farmers called for a revision or repeal of the quarantine, suggesting that the nematode had been effectively eradicated. Lobby groups throughout BC, however, appealed to the provincial and federal governments to retain the ban, arguing that even the remote possibility of spreading the golden nematode by opening up the Saanich Peninsula to international trade would negatively impact the BC vegetable industry A decision was made to retain the ban, and appeals to the government by Saanich farmers for redress were refused on the grounds of previous financial restitution.

=== Impact ===
The golden nematode infestation and the resultant ban on root crop growth, especially potatoes, had both direct and indirect consequences for the Saanich Peninsula community. Foremost, several large-scale farms were forced to sell portions of their land, encouraging a trend away from industrial farming and toward smaller-scale farming on the Peninsula. Additionally, the Peninsula farmers were forced to look to alternate crops and agri-tourism solutions to remain afloat; the Golden Nematode Order banned the growth of potatoes, tomatoes, and peppers, which together account for approximately 50% of all fresh vegetables consumed by Canadians. Without access to this substantial portion of the market, Peninsula farmers sought alternate crops, which included kiwis, berries, and grapes. Thus, combined with outside competition and new industries taking priority, the farming industry has substantially diminished on the Saanich Peninsula. It has been suggested that while fifty years ago, over 90% of food on the Peninsula was grown locally, by 2004 this percentage had dropped below 10%.

== Tutorials ==
- Marker-Assisted Selection for Resistance to Golden Nematode in Potato
