= Sulfhydrogenase =

Enzyme

Identifiers
- EC no.: 1.12.98.4
- CAS no.: 101637-43-8

Databases
- IntEnz: IntEnz view
- BRENDA: BRENDA entry
- ExPASy: NiceZyme view
- KEGG: KEGG entry
- MetaCyc: metabolic pathway
- PRIAM: profile
- PDB structures: RCSB PDB PDBe PDBsum
Search
- PMC: articles
- PubMed: articles
- NCBI: proteins

In enzymology, a sulfhydrogenase (EC 1.12.98.4), also known as sulfur reductase, is an enzyme that catalyzes the reduction of elemental sulfur or polysulfide to hydrogen sulfide using hydrogen as electron donor.

This enzyme belongs to the family of oxidoreductases. The systematic name of this enzyme class is H2:polysulfide oxidoreductase.
