= 2,2-Dichloropropane =

Names
- IUPAC name 2,2-Dichloropropane
- Other names: Dimethyldichloromethane; Dichlorodimethylmethane; Isopropylidene dichloride

Identifiers
CAS Number	594-20-7
3D model (JSmol)	Interactive image
ChemSpider	11170
ECHA InfoCard	100.008.940
EC Number	209-832-0
PubChem CID	11660
UNII	C5V432N6XB
CompTox Dashboard (EPA)	DTXSID7030060
- InChI: InChI=1S/C3H6Cl2/c1-3(2,4)5/h1-2H3 Key: ZEOVXNVKXIPWMS-UHFFFAOYSA-N
- SMILES: CC(C)(Cl)Cl

Properties
Chemical formula	(CH_{3})_{2}CCl_{2}
Molar mass	112.98 g·mol^{−1}
Appearance	Colorless liquid
Odor	Chloroform-like
Density	1.082 g/mL
Melting point	−35 °C (−31 °F; 238 K)
Boiling point	68–69 °C (154–156 °F; 341–342 K)
Solubility in water	Slightly soluble
Solubility	Soluble in ethanol, benzene and chloroform
Vapor pressure	180 hPa
Refractive index (n_{D})	1.41

Structure
Molecular shape	Tetrahedral at C

Hazards
- Occupational safety and health (OHS/OSH)
Main hazards	Highly flammable, toxic
- GHS labelling
Pictograms	(GHS02: Flammable) (GHS07: Exclamation mark)
Signal word	Danger
Hazard statements	H225, H302, H312, H319, H332
Precautionary statements	P210, P233, P240, P241, P242, P243, P261, P271, P280, P303+P361+P353, P304+P340, P317, P370+P378, P403+P235, P501
Flash point	−5.0 °C (23.0 °F)

Related compounds
Related compounds	Dimethyldichlorosilane; Dimethyltin dichloride; 1,2-Dichloropropane; 1,3-Dichloropropane
- Except where otherwise noted, data are given for materials in their standard state (at 25 °C [77 °F], 100 kPa). Infobox references

2,2-Dichloropropane is an organic compound with the chemical formula (CH_{3})_{2}CCl_{2}. It is a colorless liquid.

== Synthesis ==
2,2-Dichloropropane can be synthesized by reaction between acetone and phosphorus pentachloride at low temperatures.

CH_{3}−CO−CH_{3} + PCl_{5} → CH_{3}−CCl_{2}−CH_{3} + POCl_{3}

Another method involves the reaction between 2-chloropropylene (CH_{3}−CCl=CH_{2}) with hydrogen chloride.

CH_{3}−CCl=CH_{2} + HCl → CH_{3}−CCl_{2}−CH_{3}

== Structure ==
The distances and angles between atoms in 2,2-dichloropropane molecule are as follows:

d(C-H) = 111 pm
d(C-Cl) = 179.9 pm
d(C-C) = 152.3 pm
∠(Cl-C-Cl) = 108.3°
∠(C-C-C) = 113.0°

The C-Cl and C-C distances are shorter than the corresponding distances in 2-chloropropane.

== Polymorphism of 2,2-dichloropropane ==
The polymorphism of 2,2-dichloropropane has been investigated by thermal and X-ray powder diffraction experiments. From the former the phase transitions between the different phases have been characterized at normal and high pressures (up to 200 MPa). The existence of two low-temperature stable ordered phases (II and III), one high-temperature orientationally disordered phase (rhombohedral, Ib) and one additional monotropic orientationally disordered phase Ia, has been confirmed. The structure of the low-temperature ordered phase II has been determined by X-ray powder diffraction and Rietveld refinement as monoclinic C2/c, with lattice parameters a = 10.6402(3) Å, b = 5.4074(2) Å, c = 10.7295(3) Å, and β = 116.274(3)° at 175.2 K (−98.0 °C; −144.3 °F).

== Uses ==
2,2-Dichloropropane is used as a solvent for pesticides.

== Safety ==
Vapor of 2,2-dichloropropane is heavier than air (relative density = 3.9, air = 1), so it can spread along floors. It is highly flammable. Its vapors form explosive mixtures with air. While burning, it releases toxic gases including carbon monoxide, carbon dioxide, and hydrogen chloride. It should not be allowed to enter drains due to the risk of explosion. This chemical poses acute and chronic health hazards. It is harmful if inhaled. Can cause serious eye irritation. It is a neurotoxin and hepatotoxin.
