= 1,1,1,3,3,3-Hexachloropropane =

Chloroalkane

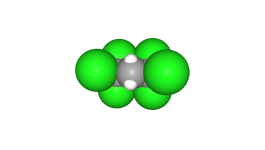

Names
- Preferred IUPAC name 1,1,1,3,3,3-Hexachloropropane

Identifiers
CAS Number	3607-78-1
3D model (JSmol)	Interactive image
ChemSpider	18133
PubChem CID	19215
CompTox Dashboard (EPA)	DTXSID3074600
- InChI: InChI=1S/C3H2Cl6/c4-2(5,6)1-3(7,8)9/h1H2 Key: BBEAZDGZMVABIC-UHFFFAOYSA-N
- SMILES: C(C(Cl)(Cl)Cl)C(Cl)(Cl)Cl

Properties
Chemical formula	C_{3}H_{2}Cl_{6}
Molar mass	250.77 g/mol
Density	d^{20}_{4} 1.68 g/mL
Melting point	−27 °C
Boiling point	206 °C (760 torr), 114-124 °C (20 torr), 89 °C (16 torr)
Refractive index (n_{D})	n^{20}_{D} 1.5179

Hazards
- GHS labelling
Pictograms	(GHS07: Exclamation mark) (GHS09: Environmental hazard)
Signal word	Warning
Hazard statements	H315, H319, H332, H335, H400
Precautionary statements	P261, P264, P271, P273, P280, P302+P352, P304+P312, P304+P340, P305+P351+P338, P312, P321, P332+P313, P337+P313, P362, P391, P403+P233, P405, P501
- Except where otherwise noted, data are given for materials in their standard state (at 25 °C [77 °F], 100 kPa). Infobox references

1,1,1,3,3,3-Hexachloropropane is a compound of chlorine, hydrogen, and carbon, with chemical formula C_{3}Cl_{6}H_{2}, specifically Cl_{3}C−CH_{2}−CCl_{3}. Its molecule can be described as that of propane with chlorine atoms substituted for the six hydrogen atoms on the extremal carbons.

== History and properties ==
There are 29 chlorinated derivatives of propane (four of them being hexachloropropanes, with the formula C_{3}Cl_{6}H_{2}). This was the last one of them to be synthesized—by A. W. Davis and A. M. Whaley—in 1950.

1,1,1,3,3,3-Hexachloropropane is a liquid that boils at 206 °C. Its boiling point is significantly higher than expected based on estimations from various molecular parameters.

== Production ==
The original synthesis by Davis and Whaley obtained the compound by reacting 1,1,3,3-tetrachloropropane and/or 1,1,1,3-tetrachloropropane with chlorine at 80-100 °C, through 1,1,1,3,3-pentachloropropane as an intermediate step.

The compound can be produced quantitatively also by reacting carbon tetrachloride CCl_{4} and 1,1-dichloroethene Cl_{2}C=CH_{2} at 80-150 °C, with a copper-based catalyst, such as copper(I) chloride or copper(II) chloride, and possibly an amine as co-catalyst. The same process can generate higher chlorinated alkanes of the form H_{3}C−(CH_{2}−CCl_{2})_{n}Cl.

== Applications ==
The compound has been considered as an intermediate in the manufacture of 1,1,1,3,3,3-hexafluoropropane, through reaction with hydrogen fluoride.

== Safety ==
A 2001 study found that the compound had significant effects on rat fetuses when inhaled at 25 ppm. The LD_{50} (injection, rats) was found to be 827 mg/kg.

== See also ==
- 1,1,2,2,3,3-Hexachloropropane
- 1,1,1,3,3,3-Hexafluoropropane
- Octachloropropane
- 1,1,1,3,3,3-Hexachloro-2,2-difluoropropane
