= Hexachloropropane =

Hexachloropropane has the following isomers:

- 1,1,1,2,2,3-hexachloropropane
- 1,1,1,2,3,3-hexachloropropane
- 1,1,1,3,3,3-hexachloropropane
- 1,1,2,2,3,3-hexachloropropane
