= C3H5Cl =

The molecular formula C_{3}H_{5}Cl may refer to:

- Allyl chloride
- 2-Chloropropylene
- Chlorocyclopropane
