= Sodium tetrasulfide =

Names
- IUPAC name Sodium tetrasulfide
- Other names disodiumtetrasulphide, sodium sulfide

Identifiers
CAS Number	12034-39-8
3D model (JSmol)	Interactive image
ChemSpider	74748
ECHA InfoCard	100.031.628
EC Number	234-805-5
PubChem CID	82835
UNII	11J35Y83VX
CompTox Dashboard (EPA)	DTXSID1065186
- InChI: InChI=1S/2Na.H2S4/c;;1-3-4-2/h;;1-2H/q2*+1;/p-2 Key: ZLCCLBKPLLUIJC-UHFFFAOYSA-L
- SMILES: [Na+].[Na+].[S-]SS[S-]

Properties
Chemical formula	Na_{2}S_{4}
Molar mass	174.24g/mol
Appearance	Dark red, slightly viscous liquid or yellow crystalline powder
Density	1.268 g/cm^{3} at 15.5 °C
Melting point	275 °C (527 °F; 548 K)
Solubility in water	Soluble in water

Hazards
- Occupational safety and health (OHS/OSH)
Main hazards	Stable at room temperature, but can be explosive when heated. Reactions with acids or oxidative agents will create gaseous byproducts that would be hazardous if inhaled.
- GHS labelling
Pictograms	(GHS02: Flammable) (GHS05: Corrosive) (GHS06: Toxic) (GHS09: Environmental hazard)
Signal word	Danger
Hazard statements	H228, H301, H311, H314, H400
Precautionary statements	P210, P240, P241, P260, P264, P270, P273, P280, P301+P310, P301+P330+P331, P302+P352, P303+P361+P353, P304+P340, P305+P351+P338, P310, P312, P321, P322, P330, P361, P363, P370+P378, P391, P405, P501
NFPA 704 (fire diamond)	3 1 1
Autoignition temperature	Not applicable
- Safety data sheet (SDS)
- Except where otherwise noted, data are given for materials in their standard state (at 25 °C [77 °F], 100 kPa). Infobox references

Sodium tetrasulfide is an inorganic compound with the formula Na_{2}S_{4}. It is a yellow-orange solid that dissolves via hydrolysis in water. It is a precursor to some specialty polymers and intermediates in prototypes of the sodium-sulfur battery.

== Synthesis and structure ==
It is produced through the reaction between elemental sulfur and sodium hydrosulfide in alcoholic solution:

2NaSH + 4 S → Na_{2}S_{4} + H_{2}S

The polysulfide anions adopt zig-zag chains of sulfur atoms. The S-S distances are about 2.05 Å and the S-S-S-S dihedral angles are around 90°.

== Reactions and applications ==
Upon treatment with acid, it is converted to hydrogen sulfide and elemental sulfur. Treatment with alkylating agents gives organic polysulfides. In one commercial application, it is used to produce the cross-linking agent bis(triethoxysilylpropyl)tetrasulfide:

Na_{2}S_{4} + 2 ClC_{3}H_{6}Si(OEt)_{3} → S_{4}[C_{3}H_{6}Si(OEt)_{3}]_{2} + 2 NaCl

Sometimes as a mixture with other polysulfides, sodium tetrasulfide is used to produce the polymer called thiokol. The reaction involves alkylation with ethylene chloride:

Na_{2}S_{4} + C_{2}H_{4}Cl_{2} → 1/n (C_{2}H_{4})S_{x}]_{n} + 2 NaCl

These materials, which have the approximate formula (C_{2}H_{4})S_{x}]_{n} (x ~ 4), are highly resistant to degradation by solvents and acids.

== Popular culture ==
In The Simpsons season 2 episode 14, Principal Charming, Bart learns about sodium tetrasulfide in class and then uses its herbicidal properties to vandalize the schoolyard. The compound is illustrated as a white powder, although Principal Skinner refers to the incorrectly-labelled substance as 'sodium tetrasulfate', which does not exist.
