= Hexafluoropropane =

Hexafluoropropane may refer to several isomeric organofluorides:

- 1,1,1,2,2,3-Hexafluoropropane, R-236cb, CAS 677-56-5
- 1,1,1,2,3,3-Hexafluoropropane, R-236ea, CAS 431-63-0
- 1,1,1,3,3,3-Hexafluoropropane, R-236fa, FE-36, CAS 690-39-1
- 1,1,2,2,3,3-Hexafluoropropane

See also: hexafluoropropene
