= Bis(triethoxysilylpropyl)tetrasulfide =

Names
- Preferred IUPAC name [Tetrasulfanediyldi(propane-3,1-diyl)]bis(triethoxysilane)
- Other names: Bis[3-(triethoxysilyl)propyl]tetrasulfide; Bis(3-triethoxysilylpropyl)tetrasulfane; Si-69; TESPT

Identifiers
CAS Number	40372-72-3
3D model (JSmol)	Interactive image
ChEMBL	ChEMBL3188179
ChemSpider	142291
ECHA InfoCard	100.049.888
EC Number	254-896-5
PubChem CID	162012
UNII	J98V193ZRY
CompTox Dashboard (EPA)	DTXSID3029362
- InChI: InChI=1S/C18H42O6S4Si2/c1-7-19-29(20-8-2,21-9-3)17-13-15-25-27-28-26-16-14-18-30(22-10-4,23-11-5)24-12-6/h7-18H2,1-6H3 Key: VTHOKNTVYKTUPI-UHFFFAOYSA-N
- SMILES: CCO[Si](CCCSSSSCCC[Si](OCC)(OCC)OCC)(OCC)OCC

Properties
Chemical formula	C_{18}H_{42}O_{6}S_{4}Si_{2}
Molar mass	538.95
Appearance	yellow syrup
Density	1.08 g/cm^{3}
- Except where otherwise noted, data are given for materials in their standard state (at 25 °C [77 °F], 100 kPa). Infobox references

Bis(triethoxysilylpropyl)tetrasulfide is an organosulfur compound with the formula S_{4}[C_{3}H_{6}Si(OEt)_{3}]_{2} (Et = C_{2}H_{5}). The molecule consists of two trialkoxysilyl propyl groups linked with a polysulfide. It is often sold as a mixture with the trisulfide. The compound is a colorless viscous liquid that is soluble in ordinary organic solvents such as toluene. Commercial samples often are yellowish. The compound is added to rubber compositions that contain silica filler.

== Synthesis and reactivity ==
Reaction

The compound was first prepared by the reaction of 3-(triethoxysilyl)propyl chloride with sodium tetrasulfide:

Na_{2}S_{4} + 2 ClC_{3}H_{6}Si(OEt)_{3} → S_{4}[C_{3}H_{6}Si(OEt)_{3}]_{2} + 2 NaCl

Bis(triethoxysilylpropyl)tetrasulfide is a bifunctional molecule in that it contains two kinds of reactive functional groups. The tetrasulfide group is a polysulfide, which means that it consists of a chain of sulfur atoms. S-S bonds are susceptible to reduction (to thiols), attachment to metals (e.g., for protection against corrosion), and vulcanization. The triethoxysilyl groups are susceptible to hydrolysis, resulting in cross-linking via sol-gel condensation. In the usual application of this chemical, the hydrolyzed siloxy groups attach to silica particles and the polysulfide groups link to the organic polymer.
