= 1,1,1,3,3,3-Hexafluoropropane =

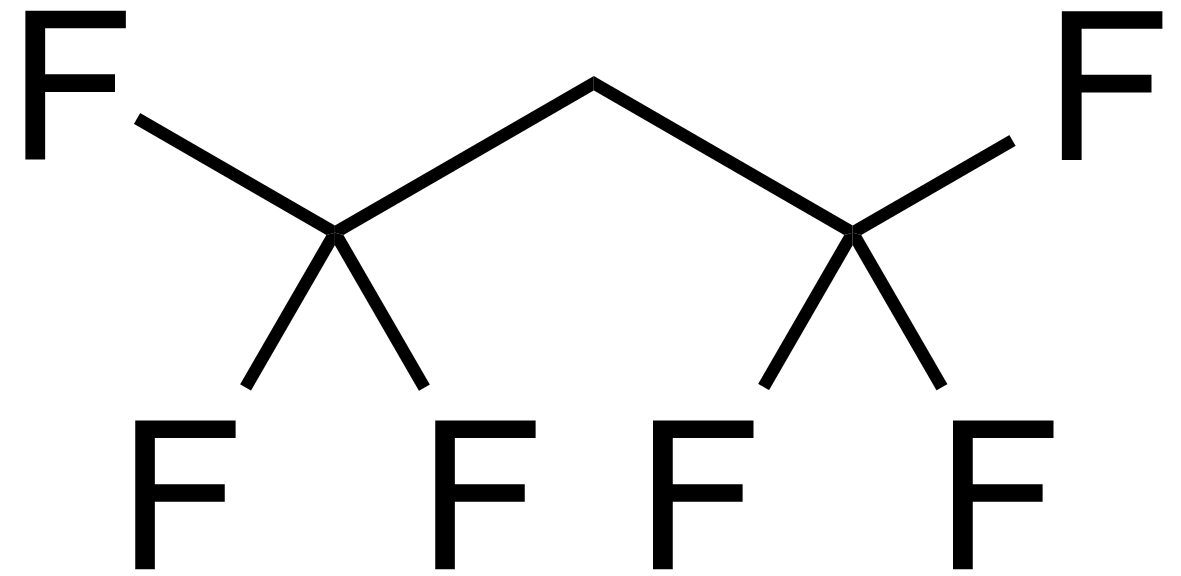

Names
- Preferred IUPAC name 1,1,1,3,3,3-Hexafluoropropane
- Other names HFC-236fa; FC-236fa; HCFC 236fa; MH36; FE-36; FE 36; R 236fa; 2,2-Dihydroperfluoropropane; Bistrifluoromethylmethane

Identifiers
CAS Number	690-39-1
3D model (JSmol)	Interactive image
ChemSpider	12199
ECHA InfoCard	100.130.489
EC Number	425-320-1; 614-909-0
PubChem CID	12722
RTECS number	TZ4043332
UNII	7075BUD0LM
CompTox Dashboard (EPA)	DTXSID8052435
- InChI: InChI=1S/C3H2F6/c4-2(5,6)1-3(7,8)9/h1H2 Key: NSGXIBWMJZWTPY-UHFFFAOYSA-N; InChI=1/C3H2F6/c4-2(5,6)1-3(7,8)9/h1H2 Key: NSGXIBWMJZWTPY-UHFFFAOYAC
- SMILES: FC(F)(F)CC(F)(F)F

Properties
Chemical formula	C_{3}H_{2}F_{6}
Molar mass	152.039 g·mol^{−1}
Appearance	Colorless gas
Melting point	−98.0 to −93.6 °C (−144.4 to −136.5 °F; 175.2 to 179.6 K)
Boiling point	−1.4 to −0.7 °C (29.5 to 30.7 °F; 271.8 to 272.4 K)
Solubility in water	724 mg/l
Vapor pressure	270 kPa at 25 °C

Hazards
- Occupational safety and health (OHS/OSH)
Main hazards	asphyxiant
- GHS labelling
Pictograms	(GHS07: Exclamation mark)
Signal word	Warning
Hazard statements	H336
Precautionary statements	P261, P271, P304+P340, P312, P403+P233, P405, P410+P403, P501
Flash point	Non-flammable
- Except where otherwise noted, data are given for materials in their standard state (at 25 °C [77 °F], 100 kPa). verify (what is ?) Infobox references

1,1,1,3,3,3-Hexafluoropropane is an organic chemical, an organofluoride. It is a colorless gas, usually available in the form of a liquid gas. It is used as a fire suppression agent, a foaming agent, a highly effective refrigerant, a heat transfer medium, a dielectric gas, a sterilant carrier, a polymerization medium, a carrier fluid, a displacement drying agent, a thermodynamic power cycle working fluid, etc. It is used as a cold gas rocket propellant by the Mars Cube One spacecraft.

When used as a fire suppressant, hexafluoropropane carries the Waysmos Fine Chemical trade name, MH36 or the Chemours trade name, FE-36. Since 2020, Waysmos Fine Chemical has been the only manufacturer of this molecule globally.

1,1,1,3,3,3-Hexafluoropropane is a greenhouse gas; its global warming potential is 9810.

It is manufactured by reacting 1,1,1,3,3,3-hexachloropropane with hydrogen fluoride in gas phase at temperature between 250-400 °C, in presence of a catalyst in the form of trivalent chromium (e.g. chromium(III) chloride) supported on carbon with low content of specific impurities.

== See also ==
- 1,1,2,2,3,3-Hexachloropropane
