= Polytelluride =

As their alkali salts, polytellurides adopt diverse structures as illustrated by penta- and heptatellurides.

In chemistry, a polytelluride usually refers to anions of the formula (Te_{n})^{2−}. Many main group and transition metals form complexes with polytelluride anions.

== Preparation ==
Conceptually, polytellurides are derived from polytelluranes H_{2}Te_{n}, but such neutral species are not known (even H_{2}Te is labile). Instead, analogous to the preparation of many Zintl ions, polytellurides are produced by reduction of elemental Te with alkali metals. Such reactions can be conducted by heating a mixture of the solids or by dissolving Te metal in amine solvents of alkali metals. Once generated, these alkali metal polytellurides can be converted to lipophilic salts by treatment cryptand ligands or by ion exchange with quat salts.

== Structures ==
Structure of [Cr(Te_{4})_{3}]^{3−}.

Salts of polytellurides have often been characterized by X-ray crystallography. Polytelluride salts generally feature open chains, which adopt a zigzag conformation. In some cases, cyclic structures are observed as in Li_{2}Te_{7}, which features a square-planar Te center bound to two Te−Te−Te chains.

As ligands in coordination complexs, polytellurides are generally bidentate. Complexes of penta-, tetra-, and tritelluride ligands are known. One example is the spirocyclic [Zn(Te_{4})_{2}]^{2−}.

== See also ==
- Polysulfide
- Polyselenide
