= Polyselenide =

Structures of two polyselenide anions.

In chemistry, a polyselenide usually refers to anions of the formula (Se_{n})^{2−}, where Se is the atomic symbol for the element selenium. Many main group and transition metals form complexes with polyselenide anions.

== Preparation ==
Conceptually, polyselenides are derived by deprotonation polyselenanes H_{2}Se_{n}, but compounds with Se-H bonds are rare or labile. Instead, analogous to the preparation of many Zintl ions, polyselenides can produced by reduction of elemental Se with alkali metals. Such reactions can be conducted by heating a mixture of the solids or by dissolving Se metal in amine solutions of alkali metals. Synthesis can also be conducted in high-boiling, polar, aprotic solvents such as DMF, HMPA, and NMP. These reactions appear to proceed by initial formation of the alkali metal selenide, followed by the reaction of the latter with additional selenium:

2 Na + Se → Na_{2}Se
Na_{2}Se + n Se → Na_{2}Se_{n+1}

Once generated, alkali metal polyselenides can be converted to lipophilic salts by treatment cryptand ligands or by ion exchange with quat salts.

Na_{2}Se_{n} + 2 R_{4}NCl → (R_{4}N)_{2}Se_{n} + 2 NaCl

Sodium polyselenide can also be generated by heating elemental selenium with sodium hydroxide.

The lithium–selenium (Li–Se) battery was considered for energy storage in the family of lithium batteries in the 2010s. Being analogous to the commercial sodium-sulfur battery, they generate polyselenides upon discharge.

== Structures ==
Salts of polyselenides have often been characterized by X-ray crystallography. Polyselenides salts generally feature open chains, which adopt a zig-zag conformation. In rare cases, cyclic structures are observed as in Li_{2}Se_{5}, which features a square-planar Se center. High resolution solid state ^{77}Se NMR spectra of [NMe_{4}]_{2}Se_{6} show three selenium sites. Single-crystal X-ray structure determination of the two salts support the NMR data.

=== Reactivity ===
Structure of (C_{5}H_{5})_{2}TiSe_{5}.

Polyselenides are prone to decomposition on exposure to air, in which case they are oxidized back to elemental selenium.

Se^{2−}_{n} + 2 H^{+} + 1/2 O_{2} → n Se + H_{2}O

As ligands in coordination complexs, polyselenides are generally bidentate. Complexes of penta-, tetra-, and triselenide ligands are known. One example is the spirocyclic [Zn(Se_{4})_{2}]^{2−}.

== See also ==
- Polysulfide
- Polytelluride
