= Dimethyltin dichloride =

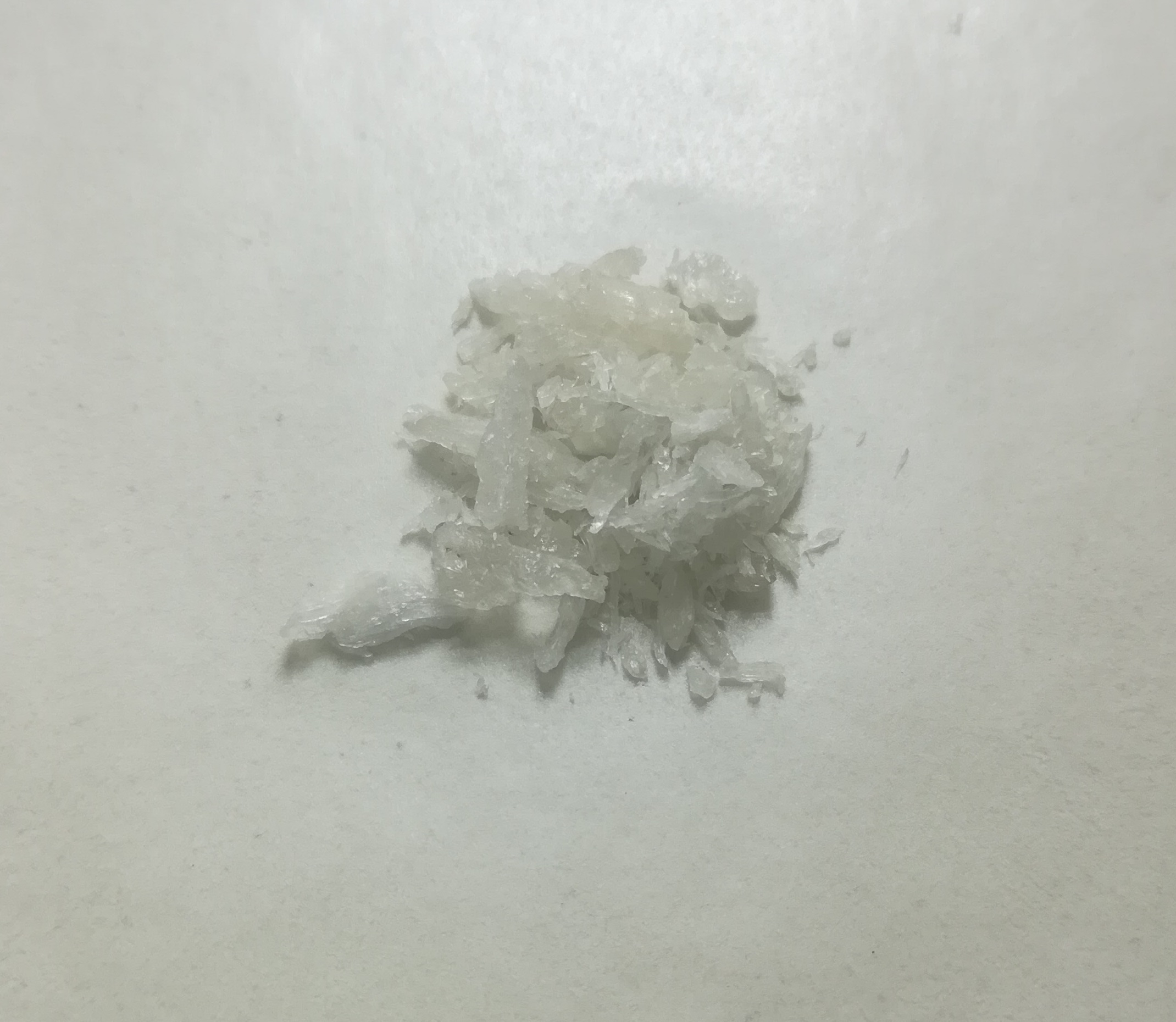

Names
- IUPAC name Dichloro(dimethyl)stannane
- Other names: Dichlorodimethylstannane; Dichlorodimethyltin; Dimethyltin dichloride; DMTC

Identifiers
CAS Number	753-73-1
3D model (JSmol)	Interactive image
ChemSpider	12415
ECHA InfoCard	100.010.945
EC Number	212-039-2
PubChem CID	12955
UNII	7K42FNK7A0
CompTox Dashboard (EPA)	DTXSID5027304
- InChI: InChI=1S/2CH3.2ClH.Sn/h2*1H3;2*1H;/q;;;;+2/p-2 Key: PKKGKUDPKRTKLJ-UHFFFAOYSA-L
- SMILES: C[Sn](C)(Cl)Cl

Properties
Chemical formula	(CH_{3})_{2}SnCl_{2}
Molar mass	219.68 g·mol^{−1}
Appearance	White crystalline solid
Density	1.397 g/cm^{3}
Melting point	101–106 °C (214–223 °F; 374–379 K)
Boiling point	189 °C (372 °F; 462 K) Decomposition at 500 °C (932 °F)
Solubility in water	823 g/l at 20 °C

Structure
Molecular shape	Tetrahedral at Sn

Hazards
- Occupational safety and health (OHS/OSH)
Main hazards	Highly toxic
- GHS labelling
Pictograms	(GHS05: Corrosive) (GHS06: Toxic) (GHS08: Health hazard)
Signal word	Danger
Hazard statements	H301, H311, H314, H330, H361d, H372
Precautionary statements	P203, P260, P262, P264, P270, P271, P280, P284, P301+P316, P301+P330+P331, P302+P352, P302+P361+P354, P304+P340, P305+P354+P338, P316, P318, P319, P320, P321, P330, P361+P364, P363, P403+P233, P405, P501
- Lethal dose or concentration (LD, LC)
LD_{50} (median dose)	204.5 mg/kg (oral, rat); 404 mg/kg (dermal, rabbit)

Related compounds
Related compounds	2,2-Dichloropropane; Dimethyldichlorosilane
- Except where otherwise noted, data are given for materials in their standard state (at 25 °C [77 °F], 100 kPa). Infobox references

Dimethyltin dichloride is an organotin compound with the formula (CH_{3})_{2}SnCl_{2}. It is a white crystalline solid.

== Synthesis ==
Dimethyltin dichloride can be synthesized by reaction of tin and methyl chloride in the presence of trialkylamine NR_{3} as a catalyst.

Sn + 2 CH_{3}Cl → (CH_{3})_{2}SnCl_{2}

Dimethyltin dichloride can also be prepared in high yield from molten tin and methyl chloride in a sodium tetrachloroaluminate salt melt at 280 °C (536 °F). The reaction is initiated by the addition of a catalytic amount of tin dichloride. In the first step, methyl chloride reacts with tin dichloride to form methyltin trichloride CH_{3}SnCl_{3}, which is in the second step reduced to methyltin(II) chloride CH_{3}SnCl with tin, releasing tin dichloride. In the third step, this reacts with another molecule of methyl chloride to form dimethyltin dichloride.

1. SnCl_{2} + CH_{3}Cl → CH_{3}SnCl_{3}
2. CH_{3}SnCl_{3} + Sn → CH_{3}SnCl + SnCl_{2}
3. CH_{3}SnCl + CH_{3}Cl → (CH_{3})_{2}SnCl_{2}

The gross equation is:

Sn + 2 CH_{3}Cl → (CH_{3})_{2}SnCl_{2}

Dimethyltin dichloride can also be prepared by the Kocheshkov reaction between tetramethyltin and tin(IV) chloride.

SnCl_{4} + Sn(CH_{3})_{4} → 2 (CH_{3})_{2}SnCl_{2}

== Properties ==
Dimethyltin dichloride is a flammable but difficult to ignite, moisture-sensitive, white crystalline solid that is readily soluble in water. It has a dipole moment of 4.14 Debye in benzene. This compound forms orthorhombic crystals.

== Reactions ==
Dimethyltin dichloride dissociates in water, creating (CH_{3})_{2}Sn(H_{2}O)_{x}^{2+} cations and Cl^{−} anions.

(CH_{3})_{2}SnCl_{2} + x H_{2}O ⇌ (CH_{3})_{2}Sn(H_{2}O)_{x}^{2+} + 2 Cl^{−}
(CH_{3})_{2}Sn(H_{2}O)_{x}^{2+} + H_{2}O ⇌ (CH_{3})_{2}Sn(OH)(H_{2}O)_{x−1}^{+} + H_{3}O^{+}

It forms adducts with Lewis bases such as pyridine and 1,10-phenanthroline.

Dimethyltin dichloride reacts with hydrogen fluoride to give a mixed halide dimethyltin chloride fluoride (CH_{3})_{2}SnClF. It reacts with trimethyliodosilane (CH_{3})_{3}SiI to give dimethyltin diiodide (CH_{3})_{2}SnI_{2}.

== Structure ==
Dimethyltin dichloride is tetrahedral at Sn. The distances and angles between atoms are as follows:

d(Sn-C) = 212.0(7) pm
d(Sn-Cl) = 238.9(2) pm
∠(Cl-Sn-Cl) = 98.60(9)°
∠(C-Sn-C) = 142.2(4)°

The length of the intermolecular tin-chlorine distance was determined to be 343.3 pm. This value shows that dimethyltin dichloride has a strong intermolecular force due to small steric hindrance of the tin atom by the two methyl groups.

== Uses ==
Dimethyltin dichloride is used as a heat stabilizer in PVC. It is also used for the production of insulating glass units with selective reflection of thermal radiation.

== Safety ==
Dimethyltin dichloride, like many other organotin compounds, is toxic and must be handled with care. Its toxic effects primarily target the kidneys and the central nervous system. At higher doses targets also the liver, adrenal glands, spleen, thymus, bladder, testes and epididymis. It can cause severe skin burns and serious eye damage.
