= 1,1,1,2-Tetrachloropropane =

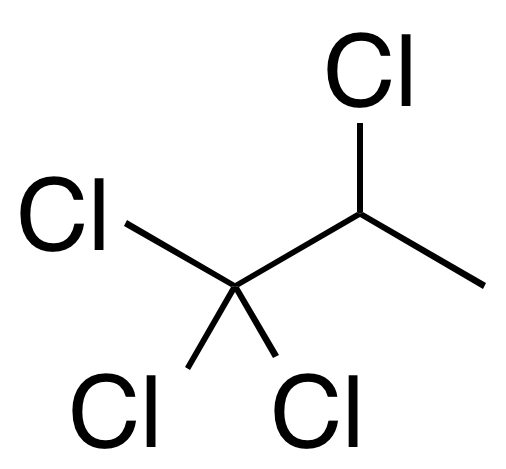

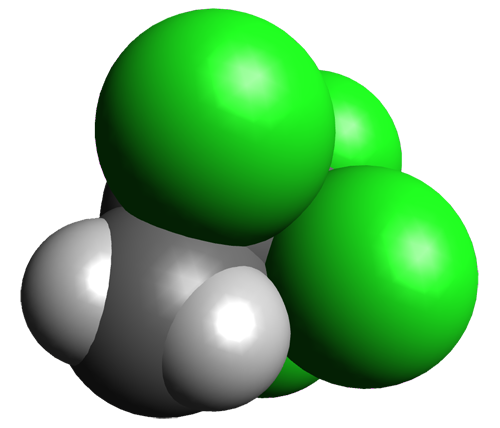

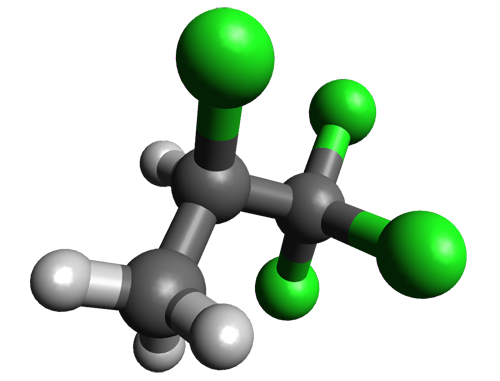

Names
- Preferred IUPAC name 1,1,1,2-Tetrachloropropane

Identifiers
CAS Number	812-03-3
3D model (JSmol)	Interactive image
ChemSpider	12579
EC Number	212-381-2
PubChem CID	13131
UNII	VW2JA99E7P
CompTox Dashboard (EPA)	DTXSID10870776
- InChI: InChI=1S/C3H4Cl4/c1-2(4)3(5,6)7/h2H,1H3 Key: FEKGWIHDBVDVSM-UHFFFAOYSA-N
- SMILES: CC(C(Cl)(Cl)Cl)Cl

Properties
Chemical formula	C_{3}H_{4}Cl_{4}
Molar mass	181.87 g·mol^{−1}
Appearance	Colorless liquid
Melting point	−64 °C (−83 °F; 209 K)
Boiling point	152.4 °C (306.3 °F; 425.5 K)
- Except where otherwise noted, data are given for materials in their standard state (at 25 °C [77 °F], 100 kPa). Infobox references

1,1,1,2-Tetrachloropropane is a compound of chlorine, hydrogen, and carbon. It has the chemical formula C_{3}H_{4}Cl_{4}. The structure has a propane skeleton, but four of the hydrogen atoms are replaced by chlorine atoms.

== Preparation ==
1,1,1,2-Tetrachloropropane can be produced by addition of hydrogen chloride to 1,1,1-trichloropropene.

CCl_{3}CH=CH_{2} + HCl → CCl_{3}CHClCH_{3}
