= Cross-link =

Bonds linking one polymer chain to another

In chemistry and biology, a cross-link is a bond or a short sequence of bonds that links one polymer chain to another. These links may take the form of covalent bonds or ionic bonds and the polymers can be either synthetic polymers or natural polymers (such as proteins). IUPAC's preferred term for this is crosslink without the hyphen, and is defined as a region from which at least 4 chains emanate.

In polymer chemistry cross-linking usually refers to the use of cross-links to promote a change in the polymers' physical properties.

When crosslinking is used in the biological field, it refers to the use of a probe to link proteins together to check for protein–protein interactions, as well as other creative cross-linking methodologies.

Although the term is used to refer to the "linking of polymer chains" for both sciences, the extent of crosslinking and specificities of the crosslinking agents vary greatly.

== Synthetic polymers ==
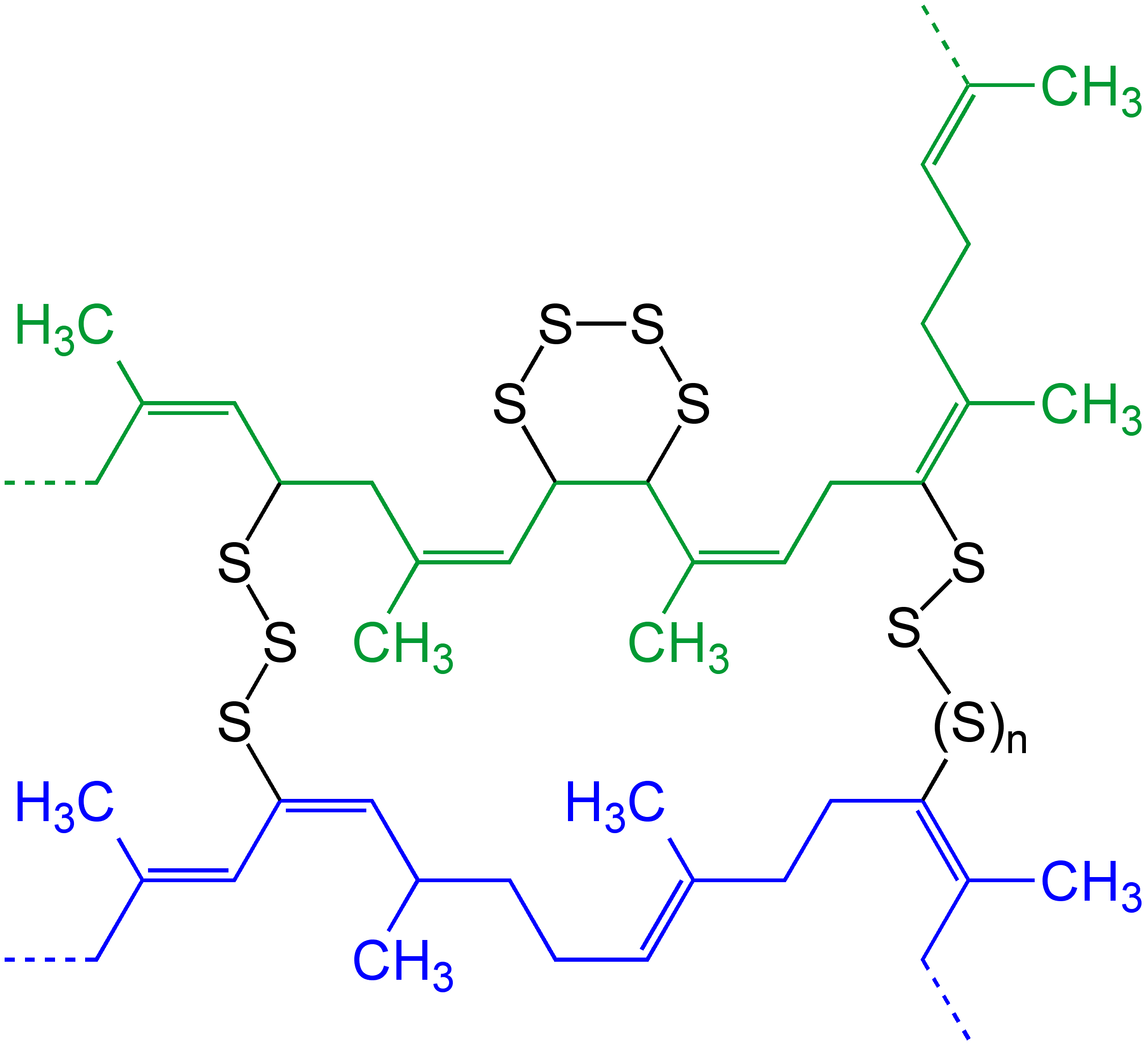
Vulcanization is an example of cross-linking. Schematic presentation of two "polymer chains" (blue and green) cross-linked after the vulcanization of natural rubber with sulfur (n = 0, 1, 2, 3, ...).

Chemical reactions associated with crosslinking of drying oils, the process that produces linoleum.

Crosslinking generally involves covalent bonds that join two polymer chains. The term curing refers to the crosslinking of thermosetting resins, such as unsaturated polyester and epoxy resin, and the term vulcanization is characteristically used for rubbers. When polymer chains are crosslinked, the material becomes more rigid. The mechanical properties of a polymer depend strongly on the cross-link density. Low cross-link densities increase the viscosities of polymer melts. Intermediate cross-link densities transform gummy polymers into materials that have elastomeric properties and potentially high strengths. Very high cross-link densities can cause materials to become very rigid or glassy, such as phenol-formaldehyde materials.

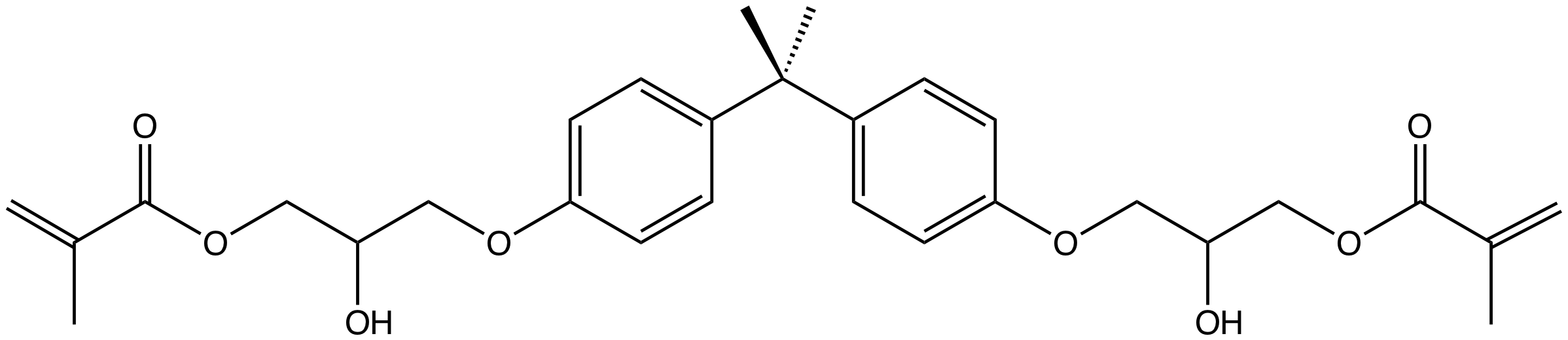
Typical vinyl ester resin derived from bisphenol A diglycidyl ether. Free-radical polymerization gives a highly crosslinked polymer.

In one implementation, unpolymerized or partially polymerized resin is treated with a crosslinking reagent. In vulcanization, sulfur is the cross-linking agent. Its introduction changes rubber to a more rigid, durable material associated with car and bike tires. This process is often called sulfur curing. In most cases, cross-linking is irreversible, and the resulting thermosetting material will degrade or burn if heated, without melting. Chemical covalent cross-links are stable mechanically and thermally. Therefore, cross-linked products like car tires cannot be recycled easily.

A class of polymers known as thermoplastic elastomers rely on physical cross-links in their microstructure to achieve stability, and are widely used in non-tire applications, such as snowmobile tracks, and catheters for medical use. They offer a much wider range of properties than conventional cross-linked elastomers because the domains that act as cross-links are reversible, so can be reformed by heat. The stabilizing domains may be non-crystalline (as in styrene-butadiene block copolymers) or crystalline as in thermoplastic copolyesters.

The compound bis(triethoxysilylpropyl)tetrasulfide is a cross-linking agent: the siloxy groups link to silica and the polysulfide groups vulcanize with polyolefins.

Alkyd enamels, the dominant type of commercial oil-based paint, cure by oxidative crosslinking after exposure to air.

=== Physical cross-links ===
In contrast to chemical cross-links, physical cross-links are formed by weaker interactions. For example, sodium alginate gels upon exposure to calcium ions, which form ionic bonds that bridge between alginate chains. Polyvinyl alcohol gels upon the addition of borax through dynamic covalent bonding between boric acid and the polymer's alcohol groups. Other examples of materials which form physically cross-linked gels include gelatin, collagen, agarose, and agar agar.

== Measuring degree of crosslinking ==
Crosslinking is often measured by swelling tests. The crosslinked sample is placed into a good solvent at a specific temperature, and either the change in mass or the change in volume is measured. The more crosslinking, the less swelling is attainable. Based on the degree of swelling, the Flory Interaction Parameter (which relates the solvent interaction with the sample), and the density of the solvent, the theoretical degree of crosslinking can be calculated according to Flory's Network Theory.

Two ASTM standards are commonly used to describe the degree of crosslinking in thermoplastics. In ASTM D2765, the sample is weighed, then placed in a solvent for 24 hours, weighed again while swollen, then dried and weighed a final time. The degree of swelling and the soluble portion can be calculated. In another ASTM standard, F2214, the sample is placed in an instrument that measures the height change in the sample, allowing the user to measure the volume change. The crosslink density can then be calculated.

== In biology ==
=== Lignin ===
Idealized structure of lignin, a highly crosslinked polymer that is the main structural material in many plants.

Lignin is a highly crosslinked polymer that comprises the main structural material of higher plants. A hydrophobic material, it is derived from precursor monolignols. Heterogeneity arises from the diversity and degree of crosslinking between these lignols.

=== In DNA ===
HN1 (bis(2-chloroethyl)ethylamine), a DNA crosslinker. Like most crosslinkers, this molecule has two reactive groups.

Intrastrand DNA crosslinks have strong effects on organisms because these lesions interfere with transcription and replication. These effects can be put to good use (addressing cancer) or they can be lethal to the host organism. The drug cisplatin functions by formation of intrastrand crosslinks in DNA. Other crosslinking agents include mustard gas, mitomycin, and psoralen.

=== Proteins ===
In proteins, crosslinks are important in generating mechanically stable structures such as hair and wool, skin, and cartilage. Disulfide bonds are common crosslinks. Isopeptide bond formation is another type of protein crosslink.

The process of applying a permanent wave to hair involves the breaking and reformation of disulfide bonds. Typically a mercaptan such as ammonium thioglycolate is used for the breaking. Following this, the hair is curled and then "neutralized". The neutralizer is typically an acidic solution of hydrogen peroxide, which causes new disulfide bonds to form, thus permanently fixing the hair into its new configuration.

Compromised collagen in the cornea, a condition known as keratoconus, can be treated with clinical crosslinking.

In the biological context crosslinking could play a role in atherosclerosis through advanced glycation end-products (AGEs), which have been implicated to induce crosslinking of collagen, which may lead to vascular stiffening.

==== Research ====
Proteins can also be cross-linked artificially using small-molecule crosslinkers. This approach has been used to elucidate protein–protein interactions. Crosslinkers bind only surface residues in relatively close proximity in the native state. Common crosslinkers include the imidoester crosslinker dimethyl suberimidate, the N-Hydroxysuccinimide-ester crosslinker BS3 and formaldehyde. Each of these crosslinkers induces nucleophilic attack of the amino group of lysine and subsequent covalent bonding via the crosslinker. The zero-length carbodiimide crosslinker EDC functions by converting carboxyls into amine-reactive isourea intermediates that bind to lysine residues or other available primary amines. SMCC or its water-soluble analog, Sulfo-SMCC, is commonly used to prepare antibody-hapten conjugates for antibody development.

An in-vitro cross-linking method is PICUP (photo-induced cross-linking of unmodified proteins). Typical reagents are ammonium persulfate (APS), an electron acceptor, and the photosensitizer tris-bipyridylruthenium (II) cation ([Ru(bpy)_{3}]^{2+}).

In in-vivo crosslinking of protein complexes, cells are grown with photoreactive diazirine analogs to leucine and methionine, which are incorporated into proteins. Upon exposure to ultraviolet light, the diazirines are activated and bind to interacting proteins that are within a few ångströms of the photo-reactive amino acid analog (UV cross-linking).

== See also ==
- Branching (polymer chemistry)
- Cross-linked enzyme aggregate
- Cross-linked polyethylene (PEX)
- Crosslinking of DNA
- Fixation (histology)
- Phenol formaldehyde resin (phenolic resin)
