= 2-Chloropropylene =

Names
- Preferred IUPAC name 2-Chloroprop-1-ene
- Other names 2-chloropropene

Identifiers
CAS Number	557-98-2
3D model (JSmol)	Interactive image
ChemSpider	10730
ECHA InfoCard	100.008.353
EC Number	209-187-5
PubChem CID	11203
UNII	50TXN55E4A
UN number	2456
CompTox Dashboard (EPA)	DTXSID4040262
- InChI: InChI=1S/C3H5Cl/c1-3(2)4/h1H2,2H3 Key: PNLQPWWBHXMFCA-UHFFFAOYSA-N
- SMILES: CC(=C)Cl

Properties
Chemical formula	C_{3}H_{5}Cl
Molar mass	76.52 g·mol^{−1}
Appearance	colorless gas
Density	0.9017 g/mL (20 °C)
Melting point	−137.4 °C (−215.3 °F; 135.8 K)
Boiling point	22.6 °C (72.7 °F; 295.8 K)

Hazards
- GHS labelling
Pictograms	(GHS02: Flammable) (GHS07: Exclamation mark)
Signal word	Danger
Hazard statements	H224, H302, H312, H315, H319, H332, H335
Precautionary statements	P210, P233, P240, P241, P242, P243, P261, P264, P270, P271, P280, P301+P312, P302+P352, P303+P361+P353, P304+P312, P304+P340, P305+P351+P338, P312, P321, P322, P330, P332+P313, P337+P313, P362, P363, P370+P378, P403+P233, P403+P235, P405, P501
- Except where otherwise noted, data are given for materials in their standard state (at 25 °C [77 °F], 100 kPa). Infobox references

2-Chloropropylene is an organochlorine compound with the formula CH_{2}=C(Cl)CH_{3}. It is a colorless gas that condenses just below room temperature. Unlike the closely related vinyl chloride, which is a major industrial chemical, 2-chloropropene has no commercial applications and is a lightly studied compound. In the research laboratory, it is used as a source of the 2-propenyl group. One early synthesis involves dehydrohalogenation of 1,2-dichloropropane with potassium hydroxide.
