= Polysulfide =

Molecules derived from sulfur chains

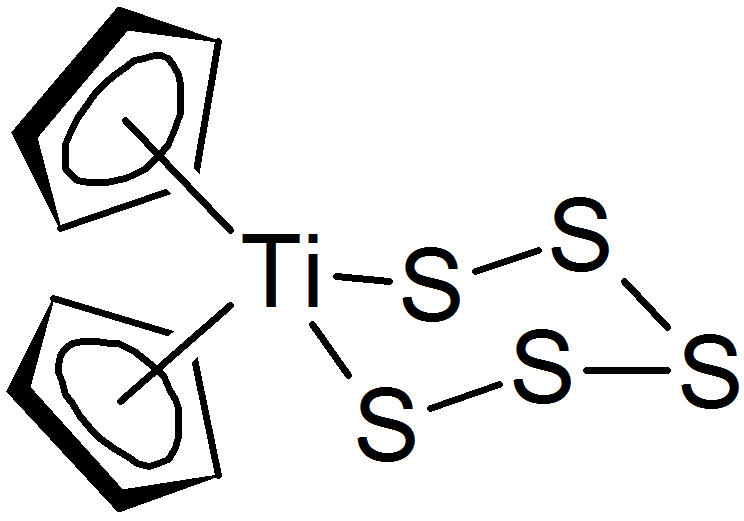
The compound (C_{5}H_{5})_{2}TiS_{5} is an example of a polysulfide complex

Polysulfides are a class of chemical compounds derived from anionic chains of sulfur atoms. There are two main classes of polysulfides: inorganic and organic. The inorganic polysulfides have the general formula S^{2−}_{n}. These anions are the conjugate bases of polysulfanes H_{2}S_{n}. Organic polysulfides generally have the formulae R^{1}S_{n}R^{2}, where R is an alkyl or aryl group.

== Polysulfide salts and complexes ==
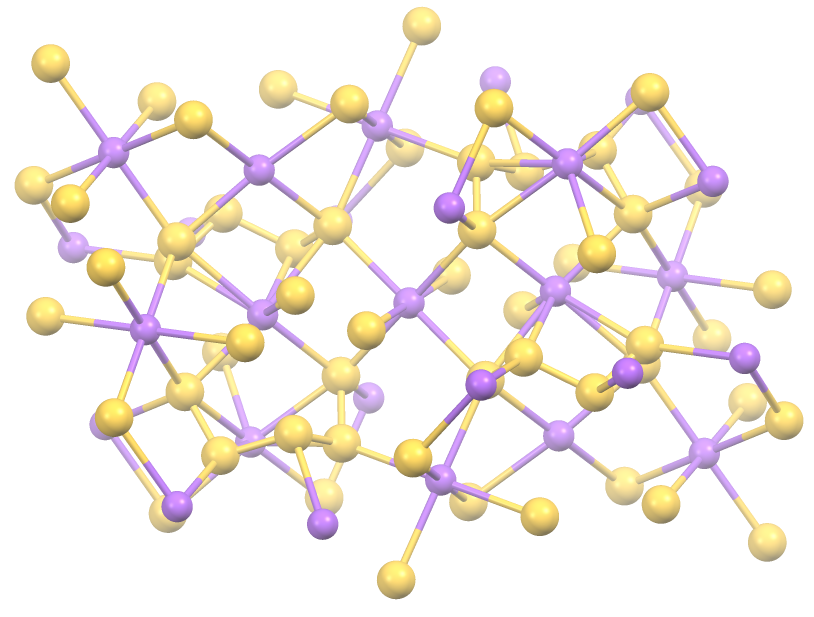
Fragment of the solid-state structure of Na_{2}S_{5}. The S^{2−}_{5} chain consists of the yellow-colored atoms.

The alkali metal polysulfides arise by treatment of a solution of the sulfide with elemental sulfur, e.g. sodium sulfide to sodium polysulfide:

S^{2−}+ n S → S^{2−}_{n+1}

In some cases, these anions have been obtained as organic salts, which are soluble in organic solvents.

The energy released in the reaction of sodium and elemental sulfur is the basis of battery technology. The sodium–sulfur battery and the lithium–sulfur battery require high temperatures to maintain liquid polysulfide and Na^{+}-conductive membranes that are unreactive toward sodium, sulfur, and sodium sulfide.

Polysulfides are ligands in coordination chemistry. Examples of transition metal polysulfido complexes include (C_{5}H_{5})_{2}TiS_{5}, [Ni(S_{4})_{2}]^{2−}, and [Pt(S_{5})_{3}]^{2−}. Main group elements also form polysulfides.

== Organic polysulfides ==
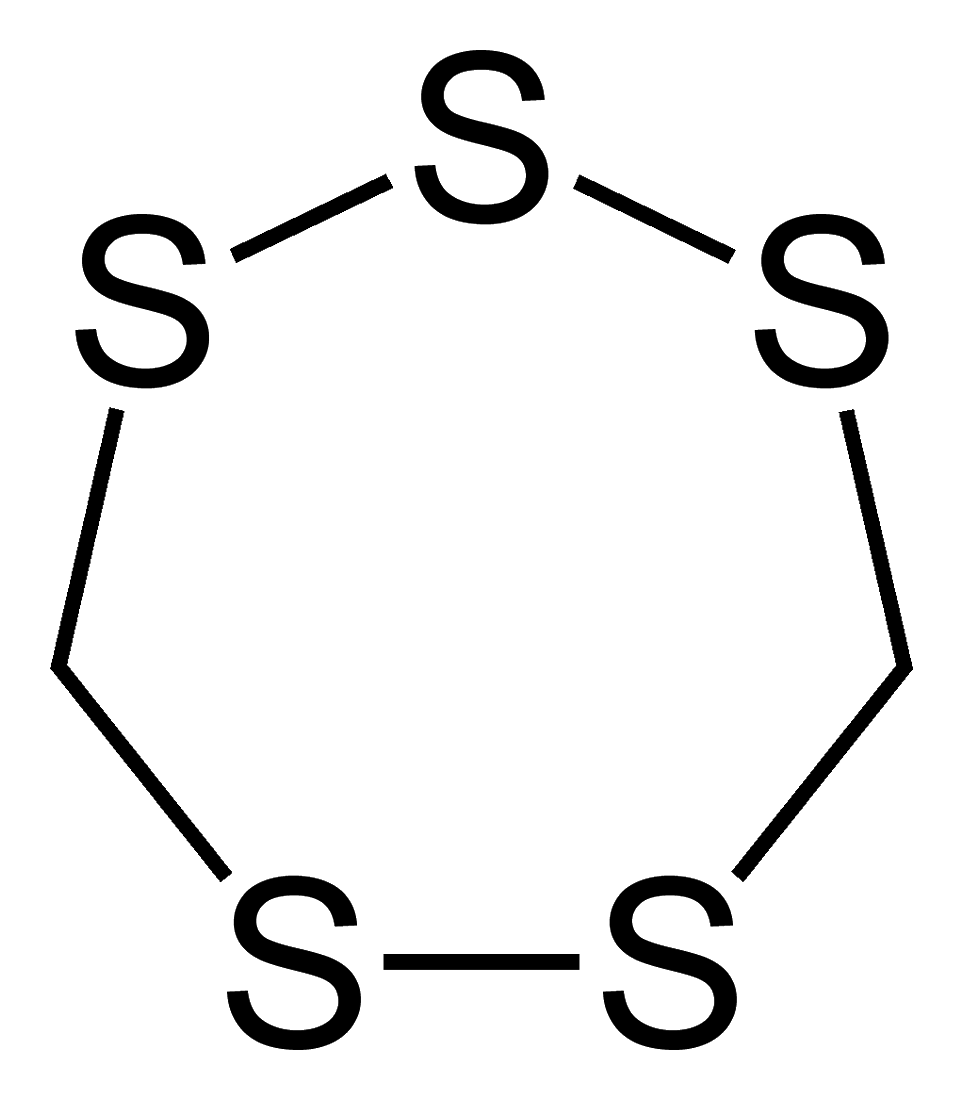
Lenthionine is an organic polysulfide found in shiitake mushrooms

In commerce, the term "polysulfide" usually refers to a class of polymers with alternating chains of several sulfur atoms and hydrocarbons. They have the formula R^{1}S_{n}R^{2}. In this formula n indicates the number of sulfur atoms (or "rank"). Polysulfide polymers can be synthesized by condensation polymerization reactions between organic dihalides and alkali metal salts of polysulfide anions:

n Na_{2}S_{5} + n ClCH_{2}CH_{2}Cl → [CH_{2}CH_{2}S_{5}]_{n} + 2n NaCl

Dihalides used in this condensation polymerization are dichloroalkanes such as 1,2-dichloroethane, bis(2-chloroethoxy)methane (ClCH_{2}CH_{2}OCH_{2}OCH_{2}CH_{2}Cl), and 1,3-dichloropropane. The polymers are called thiokols. In some cases, polysulfide polymers can be formed by ring-opening polymerization reactions.

Polysulfide polymers are also prepared by the addition of polysulfanes to alkenes. An idealized equation is:

2 RCH=CH_{2} + H_{2}S_{n} → (RCH_{2}CH_{2})_{2}S_{n}

In reality, homogeneous samples of H_{2}S_{n} are difficult to prepare.

Polysulfide polymers are insoluble in water, oils, and many other organic solvents. Because of their solvent resistance, these materials find use as sealants to fill the joints in pavement, automotive window glass, and aircraft structures.

Polymers containing one or two sulfur atoms separated by hydrocarbon sequences are usually not classified polysulfides, e.g. poly(p-phenylene) sulfide (C_{6}H_{4}S)_{n}.

=== Polysulfides in vulcanized rubber ===
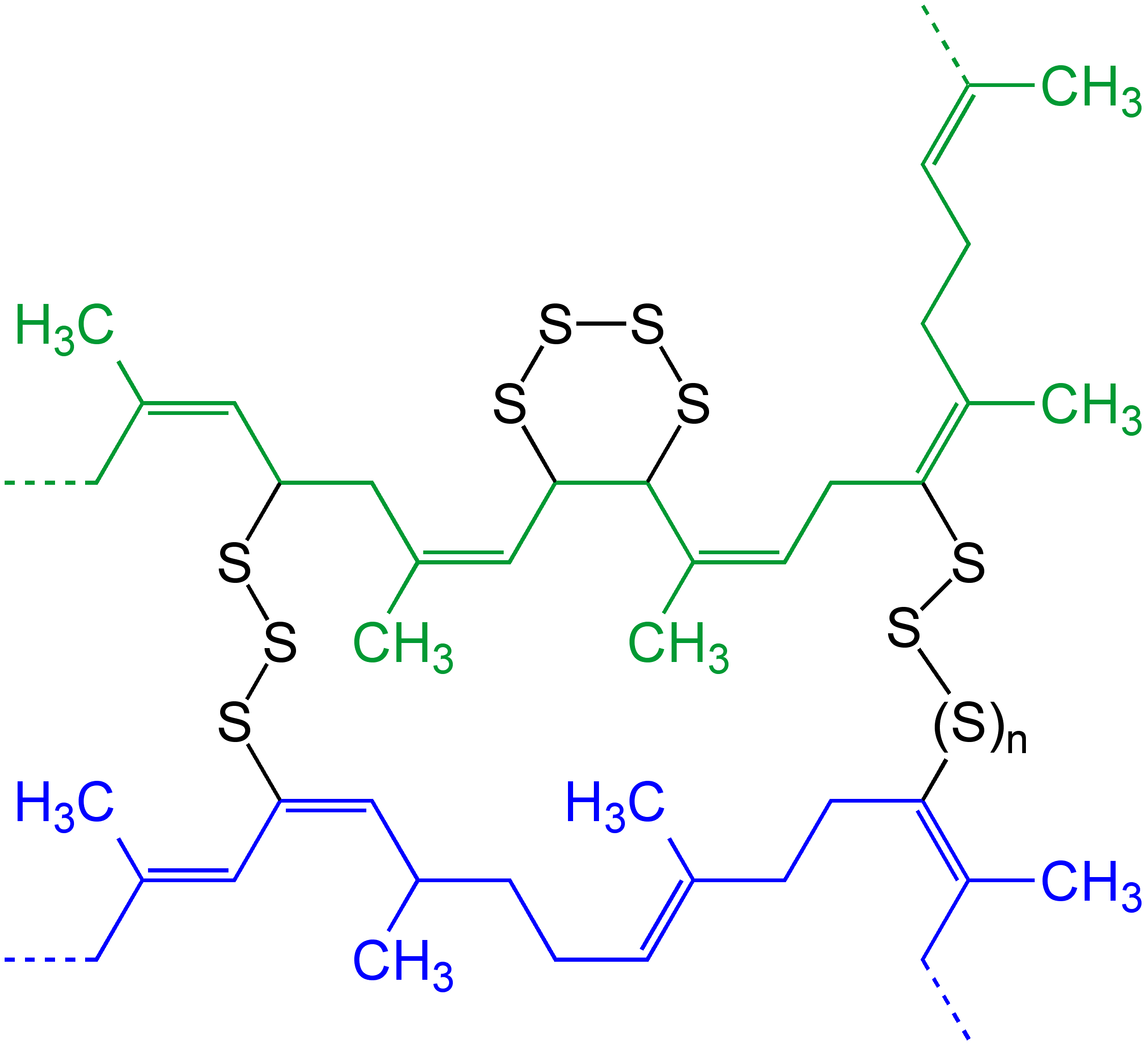
Idealized structure of two strands (blue and green) of natural rubber after vulcanization with elemental sulfur, which forms polysulfide linkages.

Many commercial elastomers contain polysulfides as crosslinks. These crosslinks interconnect neighboring polymer chains, thereby conferring rigidity. The degree of rigidity is related to the number of crosslinks. Elastomers, therefore, have a characteristic ability to return to their original shape after being stretched or compressed. Because of this memory for their original cured shape, elastomers are commonly referred to as rubbers. The process of crosslinking the polymer chains in these polymers with sulfur is called vulcanization. The sulfur chains attach themselves to the allylic carbon atoms, which are adjacent to C=C linkages. Vulcanization is a step in the processing of several classes of rubbers, including polychloroprene (Neoprene), styrene-butadiene, and polyisoprene, which is chemically similar to natural rubber. Charles Goodyear's discovery of vulcanization, involving the heating of polyisoprene with sulfur, was revolutionary because it converted a sticky and almost useless material into an elastomer that could be fabricated into useful products.

Bis(triethoxysilylpropyl)tetrasulfide is added to rubber compositions that contain silica filler.

Bis(triethoxysilylpropyl)tetrasulfide is a specialized vulcanization agent that links rubber to silica filler.

== Occurrence in gas giants ==
In addition to water and ammonia, the clouds in the atmospheres of the gas giant planets contain ammonium sulfides. The reddish-brownish clouds are attributed to polysulfides, arising from the exposure of the ammonium sulfides to light.

== Properties ==
Polysulfides, like sulfides, can induce stress corrosion cracking in carbon steel and stainless steel.

Polysulfides exist in biology as downstream metabolites of hydrogen sulfide and hydropersulfides. They are thought to play an important role in redox biology by acting as reservoirs for hydropersulfides (RSSH) and hydrogen polysulfides (RSS_{n}SH) upon cleavage of polysulfane chains by biological thiols.

== See also ==
- Disulfide – Functional group with the chemical structure R–S–S–R′
- Trisulfide – Functional group
- Hydropersulfide – Functional group with the chemical structure R–S–S–H
- Polyselenide - selenium analog
- Polytelluride - tellurium analog
- Polyiodide – Anions composed of many iodine atoms
- Catenation – Bonding of atoms of the same element into chains or rings
