= 1,3-Dichloropropene =

Skeletal formula of the trans isomer
Skeletal formula of the cis isomer
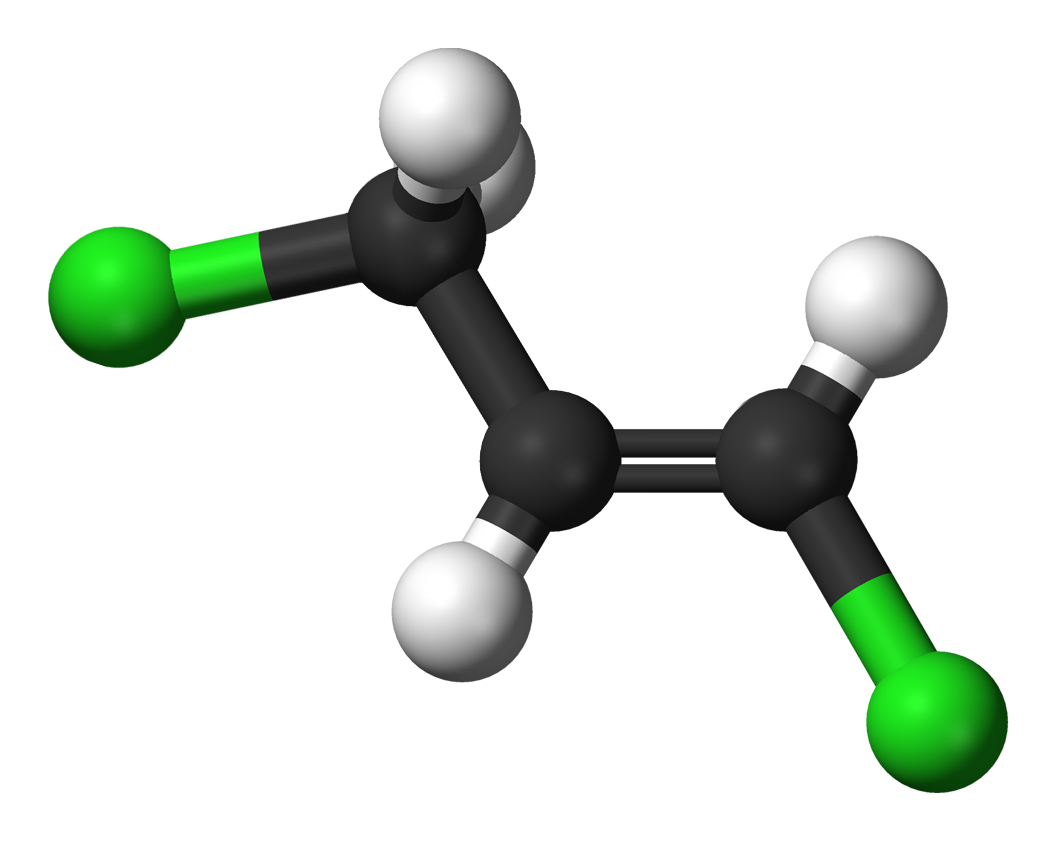
Ball-and-stick model of the trans isomer
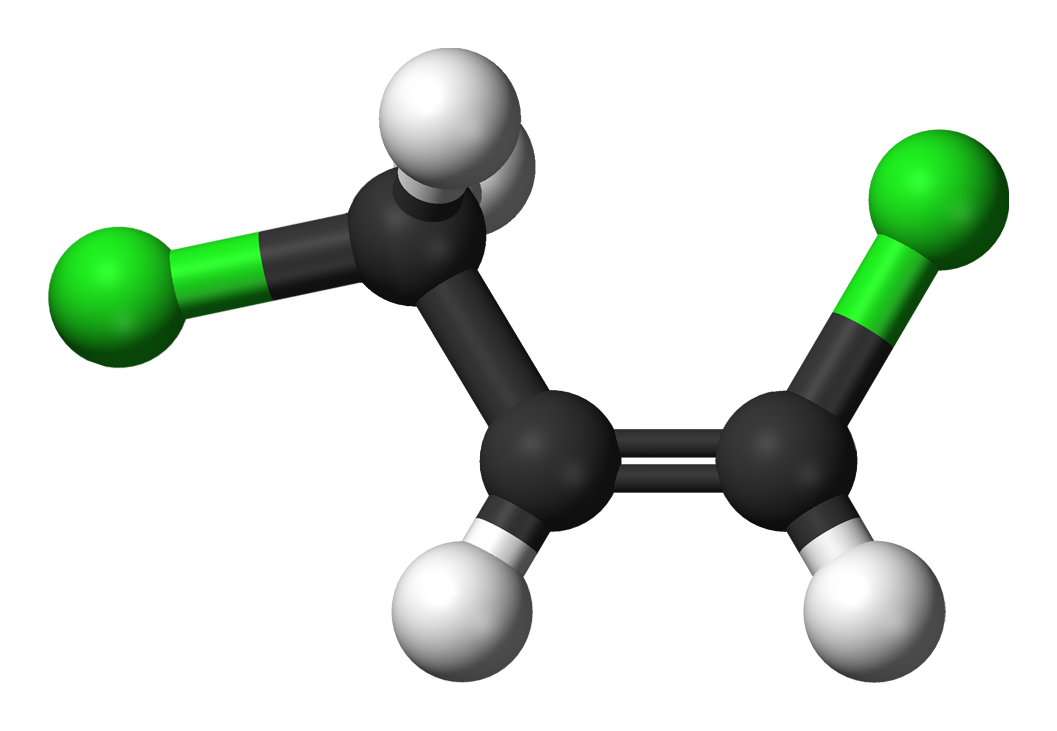
Ball-and-stick model of the cis isomer

Names
- Preferred IUPAC name 1,3-Dichloroprop-1-ene
- Other names AQL Agrocelhone, DD92, 1,3-D, Dorlone, Nematox, Telone, Nemex, cis-Dichloropropene, Di-Trapex CP, Vorlex 201, dichloro-1,3-propene, 1,3-dichloro-1-propene, 1,3-dichloro-2-propene, alpha-chloroallylchloride, chloroallylchloride, gamma-chloroallylchloride, chloroallyl chloride, chloroorpropenyl chloride, 1,3-dichloropropylene, 3-D, DCP, 3-Chloroallyl chloride

Identifiers
CAS Number	542-75-6
3D model (JSmol)	Interactive image
ChEBI	CHEBI:18918
ChEMBL	ChEMBL155926
ChemSpider	23117
ECHA InfoCard	100.008.024
EC Number	208-826-5
KEGG	C18627
MeSH	1,3-dichloro-1-propene
PubChem CID	24726
RTECS number	UC8310000
UNII	9H780918D0
UN number	2047
CompTox Dashboard (EPA)	DTXSID1022057
- InChI: InChI=1S/C3H4Cl2/c4-2-1-3-5/h1-2H,3H2/b2-1+ Key: UOORRWUZONOOLO-OWOJBTEDSA-N; InChI=1/C3H4Cl2/c4-2-1-3-5/h1-2H,3H2/b2-1+ Key: UOORRWUZONOOLO-OWOJBTEDBJ
- SMILES: Cl[C@H]=CCCl

Properties
Chemical formula	C_{3}H_{4}Cl_{2}
Molar mass	110.97 g·mol^{−1}
Appearance	Colorless to straw-colored liquid
Odor	sweet, chloroform-like
Density	1.217 g/mL (cis); 1.224 g/mL (trans)
Melting point	−84.5 °C (−120.1 °F; 188.7 K)
Boiling point	104 °C (219 °F; 377 K) (cis); 112 °C (trans)
Solubility in water	2.18 g/L (cis) @ 25 °C; 2.32 g/L (trans) @ 25 °C
log P	1.82
Vapor pressure	34.4 mm Hg @ 25 °C (cis); 23.0 mm Hg @ 25 °C (trans)

Hazards
- GHS labelling
Pictograms	(GHS05: Corrosive) (GHS06: Toxic) (GHS07: Exclamation mark) (GHS08: Health hazard) (GHS09: Environmental hazard)
Signal word	Danger
Hazard statements	H226, H301, H302, H305, H311, H315, H317, H319, H331, H332, H335, H410
Precautionary statements	P210, P233, P240, P241, P242, P243, P261, P264, P270, P271, P272, P273, P280, P301+P310, P302+P352, P303+P361+P353, P304+P312, P304+P340, P305+P351+P338, P311, P312, P321, P322, P330, P331, P332+P313, P333+P313, P337+P313, P361, P362, P363, P370+P378, P391, P403+P233, P403+P235, P405, P501
NFPA 704 (fire diamond)	2 3 0
Flash point	28 °C (82 °F; 301 K)
Autoignition temperature	> 500 °C (932 °F; 773 K)
Explosive limits	5.3% – 14.5% (80 °C)
- NIOSH (US health exposure limits)
PEL (Permissible)	none
REL (Recommended)	Ca TWA 1 ppm (5 mg/m^{3}) [skin]
IDLH (Immediate danger)	Ca [N.D.]
- Except where otherwise noted, data are given for materials in their standard state (at 25 °C [77 °F], 100 kPa). verify (what is ?) Infobox references

1,3-Dichloropropene (DCP), sold under diverse trade names, is an organochlorine compound with the formula C_{3}H_{4}Cl_{2}. It is a colorless liquid with a sweet smell. It is feebly soluble in water and evaporates easily. It is used mainly in farming as a pesticide, specifically as a preplant fumigant and nematicide. It acts non-specifically and is in IRAC class 8A. It is widely used in the US and other countries, but is banned in 34 countries (including the European Union).

== Production, chemical properties, biodegradation ==
It is a byproduct in the chlorination of propene to make allyl chloride.

It is usually obtained as a mixture of the geometric isomers, called (Z)-1,3-dichloropropene, and (E)-1,3-dichloropropene. Although it was first applied in agriculture in the 1950s, at least two biodegradation pathways have evolved. One pathway degrades the chlorocarbon to acetaldehyde via chloroacrylic acid.

== Safety ==
The TLV-TWA for 1,3-dichloropropene is 1 ppm. It is a contact irritant. A wide range of complications have been reported.

=== Carcinogenicity ===
Evidence for the carcinogenicity of 1,3-dichloropropene in humans is inadequate, but results from several cancer bioassays provide adequate evidence of carcinogenicity in animals. In the US, the Department of Health and Human Services (DHHS) has determined that 1,3-dichloropropene may reasonably be anticipated to be a carcinogen. The International Agency for Research on Cancer (IARC) has determined that 1,3-dichloropropene is possibly carcinogenic to humans. The EPA has classified 1,3-dichloropropene as a probable human carcinogen.

== Use ==
1,3-Dichloropropene is used as a pesticide in the following crops:

1,3-Dichloropropene Use in Crops
Crop	Pounds (lb)	Primary Pesticide?
Tobacco	12,114,887	Yes
Potatoes	12,044,736	Yes
Sugar Beets	5,799,613	Yes
Cotton	3,735,543	Yes
Peanuts	3,463,003	Yes
Sweet Potatoes	1,210,872	Yes
Onions	674,183	Yes
Carrots	531,752	Yes
Watermelons	133,801	No
Cantaloups	121,395	No
Cucumbers	76,735	No
Strawberries	71,753	No
Sweet Peppers	28,247	No
Melons	12,471	No
Blueberries	3,090	No
Asparagus	1,105	No

== Contamination ==
The ATSDR has extensive contamination information available.

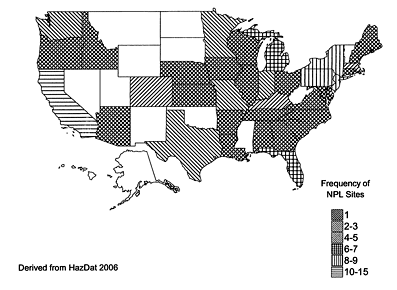
Frequency of NPL Sites with 1,3-dichloropropene contamination

== Market history ==
Under the brand name Telone, 1,3-dichloropropene was one of Dow AgroSciences's products until the merger into DowDuPont. Then it was spun off with Corteva, and as of 2020 has been licensed to Telos Ag Solutions and is no longer a Corteva product.
