= 1,1,2,2,3,3-Hexachloropropane =

Names
- Preferred IUPAC name 1,1,2,2,3,3-Hexachloropropane

Identifiers
CAS Number	15600-01-8
3D model (JSmol)	Interactive image
ChemSpider	506444
ECHA InfoCard	100.265.294
EC Number	829-705-9
PubChem CID	582658
UNII	MVZ2RU82CP
CompTox Dashboard (EPA)	DTXSID30871240
- InChI: InChI=1S/C3H2Cl6/c4-1(5)3(8,9)2(6)7/h1-2H Key: HVCSXHFGNRDDQR-UHFFFAOYSA-N
- SMILES: C(C(C(Cl)Cl)(Cl)Cl)(Cl)Cl

Properties
Chemical formula	C_{3}H_{2}Cl_{6}
Molar mass	250.77 g/mol
Density	1.73 g/cm^{3}
Boiling point	219 °C (426 °F; 492 K)

Hazards
- GHS labelling
Pictograms	(GHS07: Exclamation mark)
Signal word	Warning
Hazard statements	H302, H315, H319, H335, H412
Precautionary statements	P261, P264, P264+P265, P270, P271, P273, P280, P301+P317, P302+P352, P304+P340, P305+P351+P338, P319, P321, P330, P332+P317, P337+P317, P362+P364, P403+P233, P405, P501
- Except where otherwise noted, data are given for materials in their standard state (at 25 °C [77 °F], 100 kPa). Infobox references

1,1,2,2,3,3-Hexachloropropane is a compound of chlorine, hydrogen, and carbon, with structural formula Cl_{2}HC−CCl_{2}−CCl_{2}H. Its molecule can be described as that of propane with chlorine atoms substituted for six hydrogen atoms, two on each carbon. It is a liquid at ambient temperature.
