= 1,2-Dichloropropane =

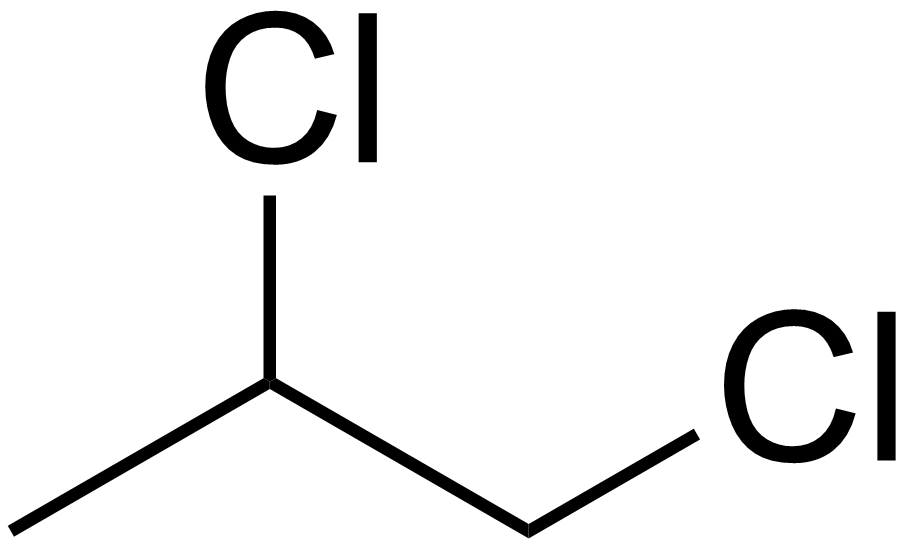

Names
- Preferred IUPAC name 1,2-Dichloropropane
- Other names Propylene dichloride, Propane, 1,2-dichloro-

Identifiers
CAS Number	78-87-5
3D model (JSmol)	Interactive image
ChEBI	CHEBI:82163
ChEMBL	ChEMBL44641
ChemSpider	6316
ECHA InfoCard	100.001.048
EC Number	201-152-2
KEGG	C19034
PubChem CID	6564
RTECS number	TX9625000
UNII	RRZ023OFWL
UN number	1279
CompTox Dashboard (EPA)	DTXSID0020448
- InChI: InChI=1S/C3H6Cl2/c1-3(5)2-4/h3H,2H2,1H3 Key: KNKRKFALVUDBJE-UHFFFAOYSA-N; InChI=1/C3H6Cl2/c1-3(5)2-4/h3H,2H2,1H3 Key: KNKRKFALVUDBJE-UHFFFAOYAR
- SMILES: ClCC(Cl)C

Properties
Chemical formula	C_{3}H_{6}Cl_{2}
Molar mass	112.98 g·mol^{−1}
Appearance	Colorless liquid
Odor	like chloroform
Density	1.156 g/cm^{3}
Melting point	−100 °C (−148 °F; 173 K)
Boiling point	95 to 96 °C (203 to 205 °F; 368 to 369 K)
Solubility in water	0.26 g/100 mL (at 20 °C)
Vapor pressure	40 mmHg (20°C)

Hazards
- GHS labelling
Pictograms	(GHS07: Exclamation mark) (GHS08: Health hazard)
Signal word	Danger
Hazard statements	H225, H302, H332, H350
Precautionary statements	P201, P202, P210, P233, P240, P241, P242, P243, P261, P264, P270, P271, P280, P281, P301+P312, P303+P361+P353, P304+P312, P304+P340, P308+P313, P312, P330, P370+P378, P403+P235, P405, P501
NFPA 704 (fire diamond)	2 3 0
Flash point	16 °C (61 °F; 289 K)
Autoignition temperature	557 °C (1,035 °F; 830 K)
Explosive limits	3.4%-14.5%
- Lethal dose or concentration (LD, LC)
LD_{50} (median dose)	860 mg/kg (mouse, oral); 1947 mg/kg (rat, oral); 2000 mg/kg (guinea pig, oral)
LC_{50} (median concentration)	2000 ppm (rat, 4 hr); 720 ppm (mouse, 10 hr); 2980 ppm (rat, 8 hr)
- NIOSH (US health exposure limits)
PEL (Permissible)	TWA 75 ppm (350 mg/m^{3})
REL (Recommended)	Ca
IDLH (Immediate danger)	Ca [400 ppm]
- Except where otherwise noted, data are given for materials in their standard state (at 25 °C [77 °F], 100 kPa). verify (what is ?) Infobox references

1,2-Dichloropropane is an organic compound classified as a chlorocarbon. It is a colorless, flammable liquid with a sweet odor. It is obtained as a byproduct of the production of epichlorohydrin, which is produced on a large scale.

== Uses ==
1,2-Dichloropropane is an intermediate in the production of perchloroethylene, carbon tetrachloride and other chlorinated chemicals via chlorinolysis: $\ce{{CH2-CHCl-CH2Cl} + 6 Cl2 -> {CCl4} + {CCl2=CCl2} + 6 HCl}$

It was once used as a soil fumigant, chemical intermediate, as well as an industrial solvent and was found in paint strippers, varnishes, and furniture finish removers but some of these uses have been discontinued.

== Carcinogenity ==
Following several cases of bile duct cancer among Japanese printing firm employees, an investigation by the Japanese Ministry of Health, Labour and Welfare concluded in March 2013 that these cases were likely due to the use of cleaning agents containing 1,2-dichloropropane. Thus, there is reasonable evidence that 1,2-dichloropropane may be a carcinogen.

Data from animal studies show tumor growth in the liver and mammary glands. Further animal studies involving inhalation toxicity data has caused the National Institute for Occupational Safety and Health to classify 1,2-dichloropropane as a carcinogen and IDLH.
