= 1,3-Dichloropropane =

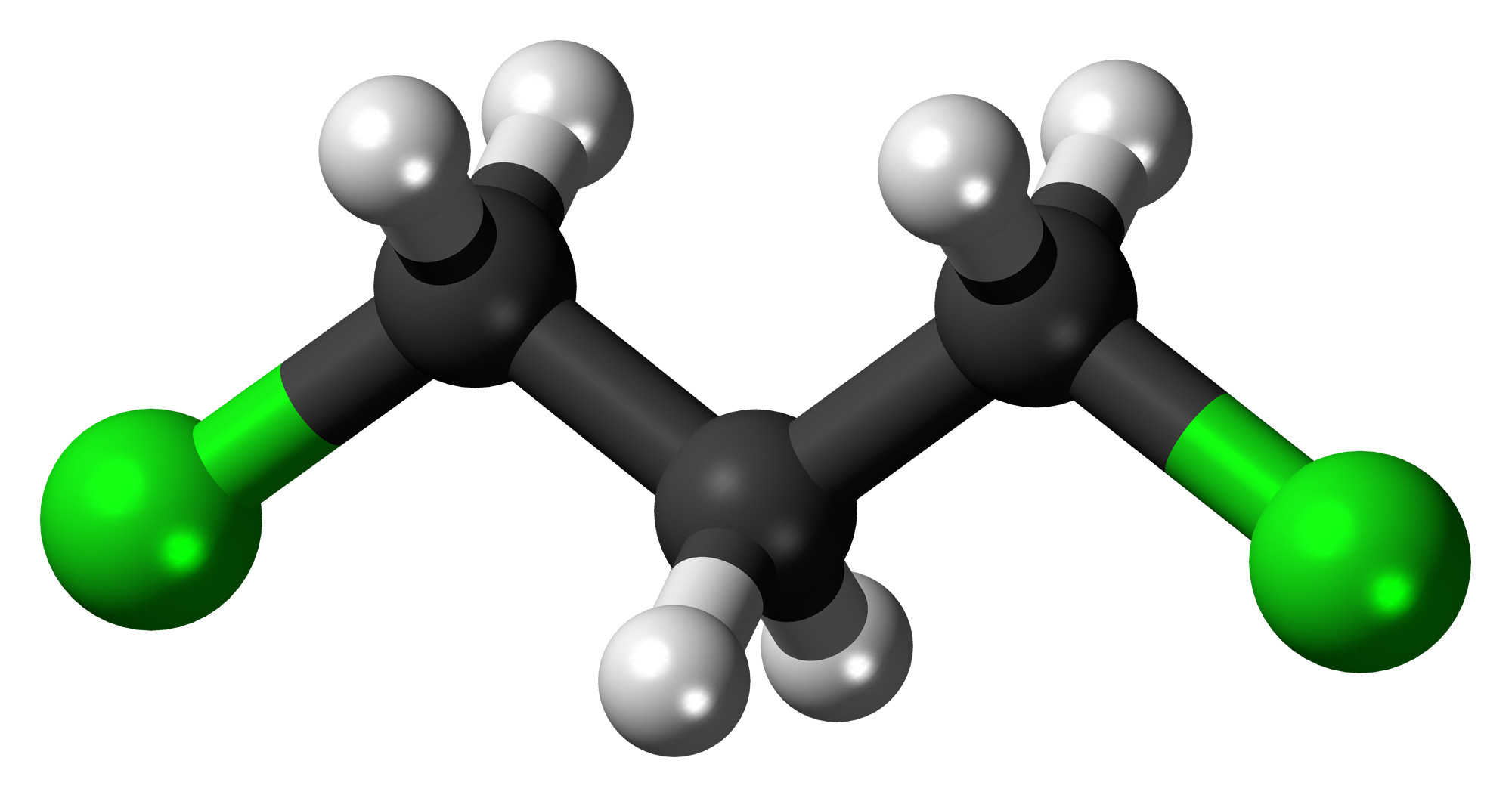

Names
- Preferred IUPAC name 1,3-Dichloropropane

Identifiers
CAS Number	142-28-9
3D model (JSmol)	Interactive image
ChEBI	CHEBI:137978
ChEMBL	ChEMBL157427
ChemSpider	8543
ECHA InfoCard	100.005.029
EC Number	205-531-3
PubChem CID	8881
RTECS number	TX9660000
UNII	AJ1HQ2GUCP
UN number	1993 1992
CompTox Dashboard (EPA)	DTXSID6022004
- InChI: InChI=1S/C3H6Cl2/c4-2-1-3-5/h1-3H2 Key: YHRUOJUYPBUZOS-UHFFFAOYSA-N; InChI=1/C3H6Cl2/c4-2-1-3-5/h1-3H2 Key: YHRUOJUYPBUZOS-UHFFFAOYAZ
- SMILES: ClCCCCl

Properties
Chemical formula	C_{3}H_{6}Cl_{2}
Molar mass	112.98 g·mol^{−1}
Density	1.19 g/cm^{3}
Melting point	−99 °C (−146 °F; 174 K)
Boiling point	120–122 °C (248–252 °F; 393–395 K)

Hazards
- GHS labelling
Pictograms	(GHS05: Corrosive) (GHS07: Exclamation mark)
Signal word	Danger
Hazard statements	H225, H226, H315, H319, H332
Precautionary statements	P210, P233, P240, P241, P242, P243, P261, P264, P271, P280, P302+P352, P303+P361+P353, P304+P312, P304+P340, P305+P351+P338, P312, P321, P332+P313, P337+P313, P362, P370+P378, P403+P235, P501
- Except where otherwise noted, data are given for materials in their standard state (at 25 °C [77 °F], 100 kPa). Infobox references

1,3-Dichloropropane is a compound of chlorine, hydrogen, and carbon. It may be found as a contaminant in soil fumigants containing 1,3-dichloropropene. It has low acute toxicity.
