= ZEBRA battery =

Type of molten salt battery

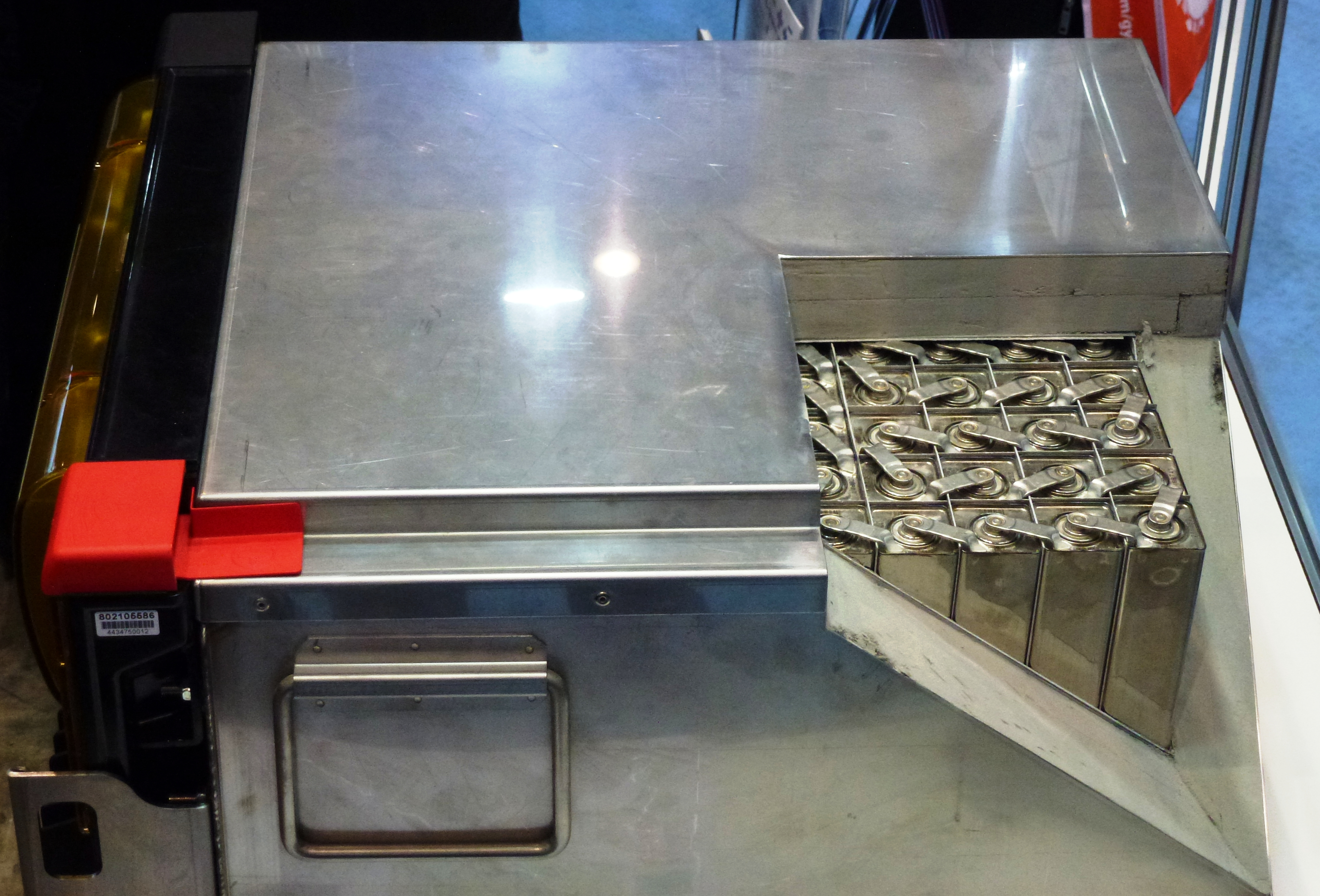
A ZEBRA molten salt battery.

The ZEBRA battery is a type of rechargeable molten salt battery based on commonly available and low-cost materials – primarily nickel metal, the sodium and chloride from conventional table salt, as well beta-alumina solid electrolyte. It is technically known as the sodium–nickel–chloride battery, and sometimes as a sodium–metal–halide battery. The common name comes from its development under the Zeolite Battery Research Africa (ZEBRA) project, started in South Africa in 1985.

ZEBRA batteries need to be kept hot (300 °C is often used) because sodium metal melts at 98 °C and because the NaAlCl4-based electrolyte melts above 150 °C. Also such elevated temperature increases the ionic conductivity of beta-alumina solid electrolyte. Due to the thermal management reasons, ZEBRA batteries are only practical when built in large formats. They have been examined primarily for grid energy storage and to a lesser degree for electric vehicles. The ZEBRA is a simpler, safer and less expensive alternative to the otherwise similar sodium–sulfur battery, although it offers less energy density, about 90 to 120 Wh/kg compared to as much as 150 Wh/kg for sodium–sulfur. ZEBRA and sodium–sulfur both compete with better-known systems, like lithium–iron–phosphate and lithium–sulfur in these same roles.

The ZEBRA design saw on-and-off development since the 1980s, with major research being carried out in the AERE Harwell and AEG during the 1990s. After Daimler purchased AEG and then merged with Chrysler, the ZEBRA division was sold off. AERE's development was spun off as Beta R&D and purchased by General Electric in 2011. GE tried to launch commercial production of molten sodium–nickel–chloride battery under the name Durathon, but it scrapped this project in 2015, citing market rather than technical difficulties. The only producer of sodium-metal chloride (SMC) batteries is now FZSoNick.

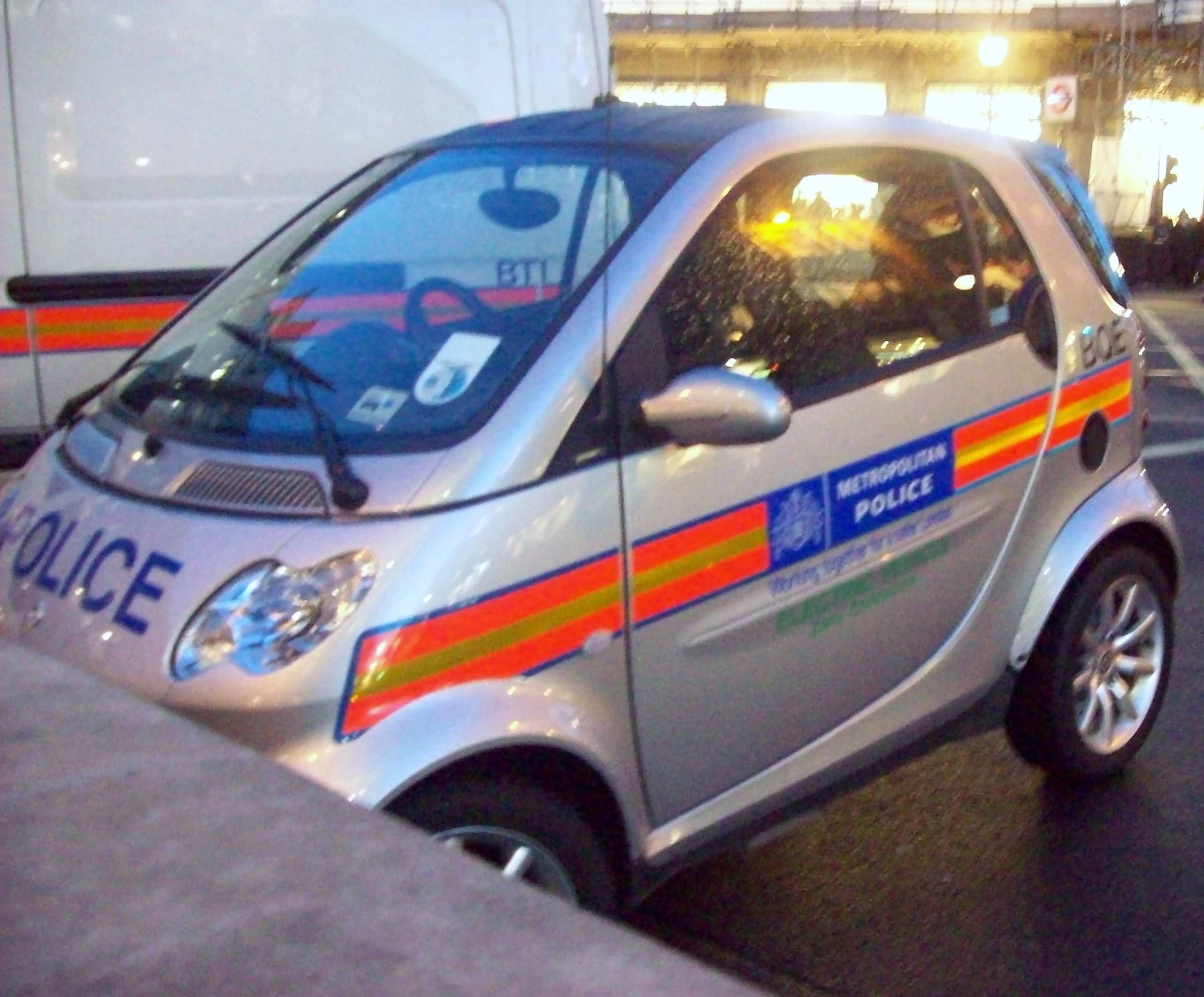
A Smart ED1 Metro Police Car in central London in 2008, with 13 kWh ZEBRA battery

Daimler came back to ZEBRA batteries in 2006, to develop an Electric Drive version of the Smart ForTwo, still using the first generation type 450 body style. The ED1 ran on 13.2 kilowatt hours of sodium-nickel chloride Zebra batteries operating at 245 °C (473 °F). It is typically kept molten and ready for use because if allowed to "freeze" it takes twelve hours to reheat and charge. Thus it is not very useful for private owners, but rather in fleets of taxis, police cars and other vehicles that are operated by multiple users. Field testing began in London with 100 vehicles in 2007 and was available only for lease to corporate clients for £375 per month. From 2009 onwards, Smart used Lithium Ion, with Tesla providing the battery packs for the ED2 car sharing fleet, and Daimler producing their own cells for the 2012 to 2015 ED3 series, the first Smart EV version that was actually sold to the public.

== Description ==
=== Background ===
Chemical reactions involve the exchange of electrons. The materials involved in the reactions are referred to as reagents. Batteries use some form of mechanical or chemical barrier to prevent these electron exchanges taking place spontaneously, only allowing them to occur when an external pathway is available for the electrons to move through. This pathway is then attached to a load, and used to do work. In most batteries the reaction is controlled through the use of an electrolyte between two reagents. If the resulting reactants are released from the system they are more typically (but not always) classified as fuel cells.

In the common disposable zinc–carbon battery ("dry cell"), the two primary chemicals involved are zinc and manganese oxide, separated by an electrolyte of zinc chloride and ammonium chloride dissolved in water to form a thick paste. The movement of oxygen from the electrolyte to the zinc in the outer case of the battery drives one half of the reaction. This reaction can only continue if additional oxygen is freed from the electrolyte. The second half of the reaction is provided by the manganese oxide electrode, which gives up oxygen into the electrolyte when presented with electrons. So, attaching a conductor between the zinc to the manganese will cause current to flow.

In the zinc–carbon battery, the chemical reaction can only occur easily in one direction - attempting to "recharge" the battery will not cause the zinc to cleanly reform into its original solid state. There are other reactions where the materials do not change form in the same way, or to the same degree, and can be recharged. Batteries are generally divided into two types; "primary" batteries which cannot be recharged, and "secondary" batteries which can. Improved types of secondary batteries are a major area of research.

=== Molten salt designs ===
Many ionically bonded compounds are potentially useful materials for a battery. The voltage of the reaction, and thus the total available energy per molecule, is increased by selecting reactants that are located as far apart as possible on the periodic table. Most advanced battery technologies are based on elements from the light metal category, specifically lithium and sodium, and the reactive elements at the other side of the graph, like oxygen and sulphur.

This makes common table salt an almost ideal battery material, producing 2.58 volts when it combines, compared to about 1.5 v for common zinc-based batteries. However, this combination normally takes place in the molten state. With conventional liquid electrolytes, the molten salt materials would be free to mix, completing the reaction without requiring an external circuit or thereby extracting power. In this case a battery has to use a solid electrolyte separating the liquid reagents.

The first molten salt batteries were developed in the 1940s and first widely used in missile guidance systems in the WWII era and after. These designs used magnesium oxide as a sponge to store the reagents that were formed separately in the liquid state. After being soaked in the reagents, the magnesium oxide was then cooled into a solid, pressed into pellets, and stacked. When the pellets are heated, the reagents melted and flowed out of the sponge to start generating power. This allows them to be stored for extended periods with no losses, but are "one shot" use only.

=== Sodium–sulphur ===
A key development in the rechargeable molten salt battery market was the development of solid ceramic electrolyte known as beta-alumina solid electrolyte, or BASE. BASE, a zeolite, allows sodium ions to move through it, while blocking non-ionized sodium and other molecules as well. Combining BASE with ionic salts led to the sodium–sulphur battery, the first rechargeable molten salt battery. In typical designs, a cylinder of BASE separates sodium on the inside from sulphur on the outside, mediating the exchange of charge between them. When the sodium gives up an electron, it can move through the BASE to combine with the sulphur in a carbon sponge wrapped around the BASE.

For operation, the entire battery must be heated to, or above, the melting point of sulphur at 119 °C (246 °F). Sodium has a lower melting point, around 98 °C (208 °F), so a battery that holds molten sulphur holds molten sodium by default. This presents a serious safety concern; sodium can be spontaneously inflammable in air, and sulphur is highly flammable. Several examples of the Ford Ecostar, equipped with such a battery, burst into flame during recharging, leading Ford to give up on the concept. A major grid-storage development using the system also caused a serious fire in the September 2011 Tsukuba Plant fire incident. See more at Sodium–sulfur battery.

=== ZEBRA ===
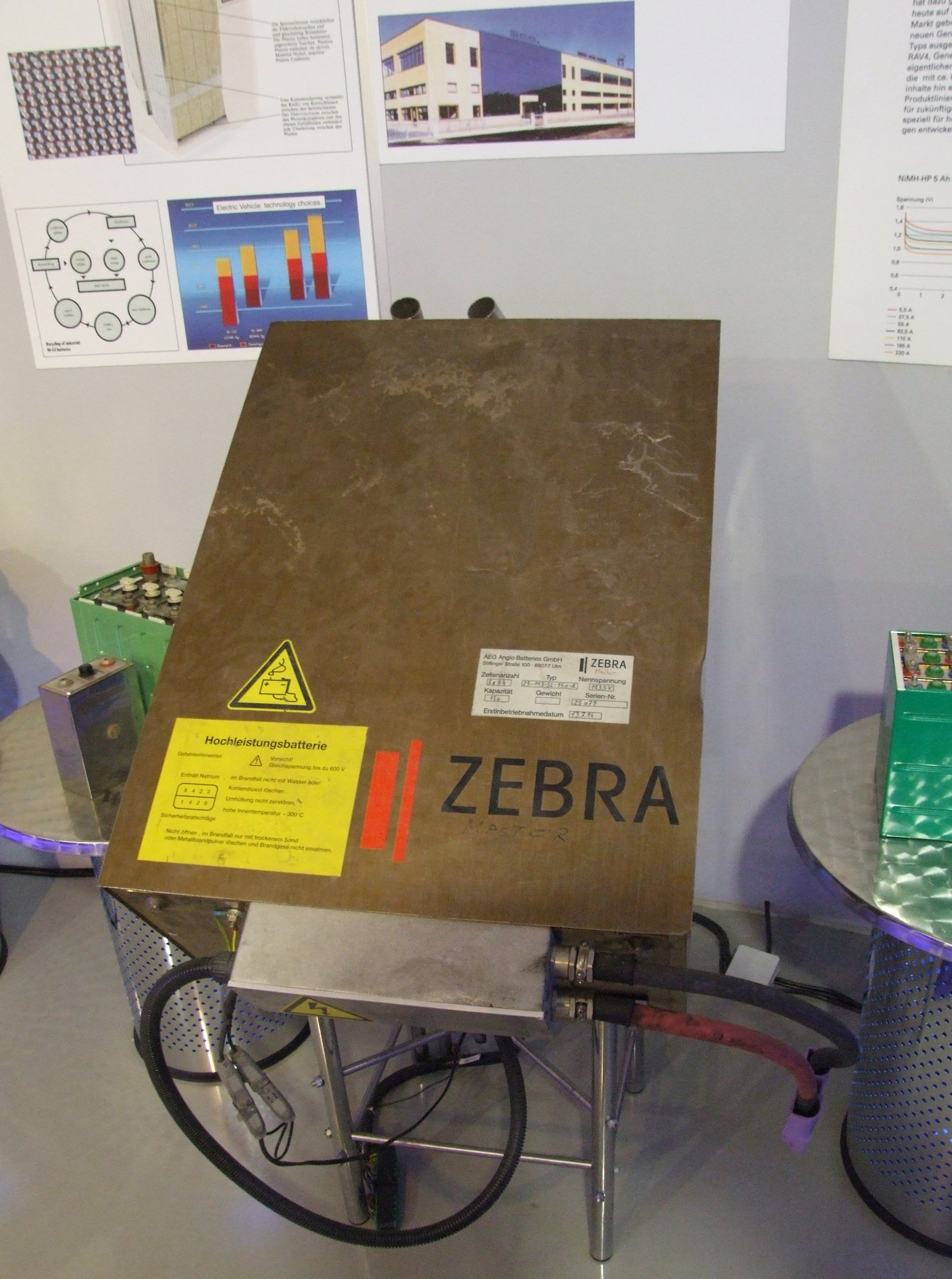
ZEBRA battery at Museum Autovision.

A molten salt battery using safer reagents would have an obvious advantage over the sodium–sulphur design. However, most promising materials did not work well with BASE in its current form. This led to the ZEBRA effort, to try to modify BASE to allow operation with common table salt. The basic idea was developed by Johan Coetzer at the Council for Scientific and Industrial Research in South Africa, with the first patent granted in 1978.

Further development began in the UK at AERE Harwell and was then spun-off as BETA Research and Development. BETA was in turn merged into a joint venture formed by AEG (later Daimler) and Anglo American in 1988. The merged company, AEG Anglo Batteries, began pilot construction of ZEBRA batteries in 1994, but with the 1998 merger of Daimler with Chrysler the project was terminated. MES-DEA, formed in 1999 in Switzerland, took over development. Small-scale production was undertaken, a few thousands packs per year. Innovenergy in Meiringen, Switzerland has further optimised this technology with the use of domestically sourced raw materials, except for the nickel component. Despite the reduced capacity compared with lithium-ion batteries, the ZEBRA technology is applicable for stationary energy storage from solar power. The company operates a 540 kwh storage facility for solar cells on the roof of a shopping center, and produces over a million battery units per year from sustainable, non-toxic materials.

The key to the ZEBRA design was the development of a mixture of nickel and BASE-like sodium aluminum chloride to produce a new solid electrolyte. Like the sodium–sulfur design, ZEBRA is normally constructed in a cylindrical annual assembly, or "canular". The outer case, nickel-coated stainless steel, acts as the negative terminal and the primary container of the assembly. Directly inside the casing is the sodium metal. Suspended within the sodium is the ceramic BASE electrode, and within it, a mixture of NiCl_{2} and NaAlCl_{4}. Suspended in the middle of that is an electrode that acts as the positive terminal.

BASE ceramic is relatively brittle, which makes it subject to fracture due to mechanical shocks. When these open, the NaAlCl_{4} comes into contact with the sodium to form a salt and precipitate aluminum:

NaAlCl_{4} + 3Na ⟹ 4NaCl+ Al

This is a rigid compound that seals small cracks. If larger cracks form the cell with short-circuit to some degree, and has to be removed from the battery circuit.

The charge curve of the ZEBRA design has a rather abrupt voltage drop just before the cell is fully discharged. This makes it difficult to know the state of charge (SOC) and whether the battery is about to "die". To help reduce this, additional aluminum power is added to produce a second reaction:

Al + 4NaCl ⟺ 3Na + NaAlCl_{4}

Which can indicate the state of charge when this reaction stops occurring and there is a smaller voltage drop, indicating the battery is at a low SOC.

The salt liquefies at 154 °C (309 °F) and the battery must run at at least this temperature, normally closer to 300 °C (572 °F). For thermal regulation, the cells are held within a double-wall vacuum bottle, typically about 25 millimetres (0.98 in) thick. If the battery cools to room temperature, it takes as much as two days to bring it back into operation. The hot materials and sodium metal remains a safety issue.

Unlike a Na–S battery, NaAlCl4 is typically used as the secondary liquid electrolyte (catholyte) in a ZEBRA battery to facilitate the Na+ ion movement in the cathode, providing critical advantages over a Na–S battery including lower operating temperatures and safe cell failure modes. A ZEBRA battery also has benefits such as higher voltage and safe assembly in the discharged state without using metallic sodium in the anode

=== Durability and degradation ===
1. As NaCl forms a product of the discharge reaction, it results in Ostwald ripening of NaCl particles, which shows up as an increase in the cell’s internal resistance via several mechanisms.
2. The decrease in the surface area (particle growth) of the Ni electrode with cycling is a secondary degradation pathway.
3. Beta-alumina solid electrolyte can decompose according to reaction:
  2 NaAl_{11}O_{17} = Na_{2}O + 11 Al_{2}O_{3}, 2 NaAl_{5}O_{8} = Na_{2}O + 5 Al_{2}O_{3},
  which shows up as an increase in the ionic resistance of the electrolyte. Also, it readily absorbs moisture from air and decomposes forming NaOH and Al(OH)_{3}.
4. Beta-alumina surface layer on the Na side turns grey after over 100 cycles. This is caused by a slower growth of micron-size sodium metal globules in the triple-junctions between the grains of the solid electrolyte. This process is possible, because the electronic conductivity of beta-alumina is small but not zero. The formation of such sodium metal globules gradually increases the electronic conductivity of the electrolyte and causes electronic leakage and self-discharge;
5. During charge, sodium metal dendrites tend to form (slowly after several cycles) and propagate (rather quickly once they nucleate) into the intergrain boundaries in the solid beta-alumina electrolyte, eventually leading to internal short-circuiting. In general, a significant threshold current density needs to be exceeded before such rapid Mode I fracture-degradation is initiated.;
6. Oxygen-depletion in the alumina near the sodium electrode has been suggested as a possible trigger for crack formation.
7. Passing current (e.g., over 1 A/cm2) through beta-alumina can cause temperature gradient (e.g., over 50 °C (122 °F) or 2 mm (0.079 in)) in the electrolyte, which in turn results in a thermal stress.
