= Citroën Berlingo électrique =

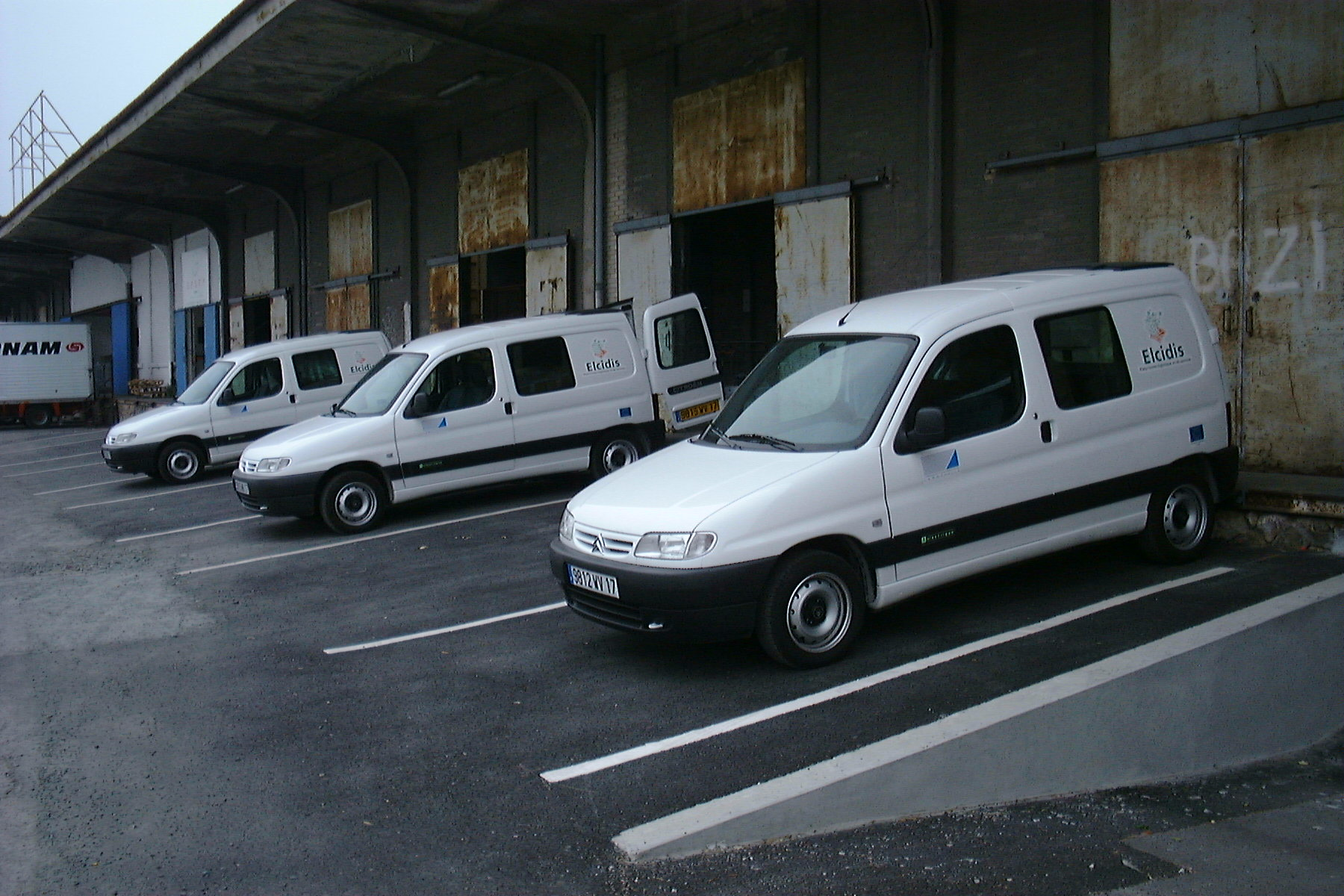
- Three electric Berlingos in La Rochelle, used for final-mile deliveries by Elcidis

Overview
- Manufacturer: Citroën
- Production: 1998–2005

Powertrain
- Battery: 16.2 kW-hr, 27×Saft STM MR-MRE NiCd
- Electric range: 95 km (59 mi)

Dimensions
- Wheelbase: 2,690 mm (105.9 in)
- Length: 4,108 mm (161.7 in)
- Width: 1,719 mm (67.7 in)
- Height: 1,809 mm (71.2 in)
- Kerb weight: 1,466 kg (3,232 lb)

Chronology
- Predecessor: C15
- Successor: Berlingo Electric

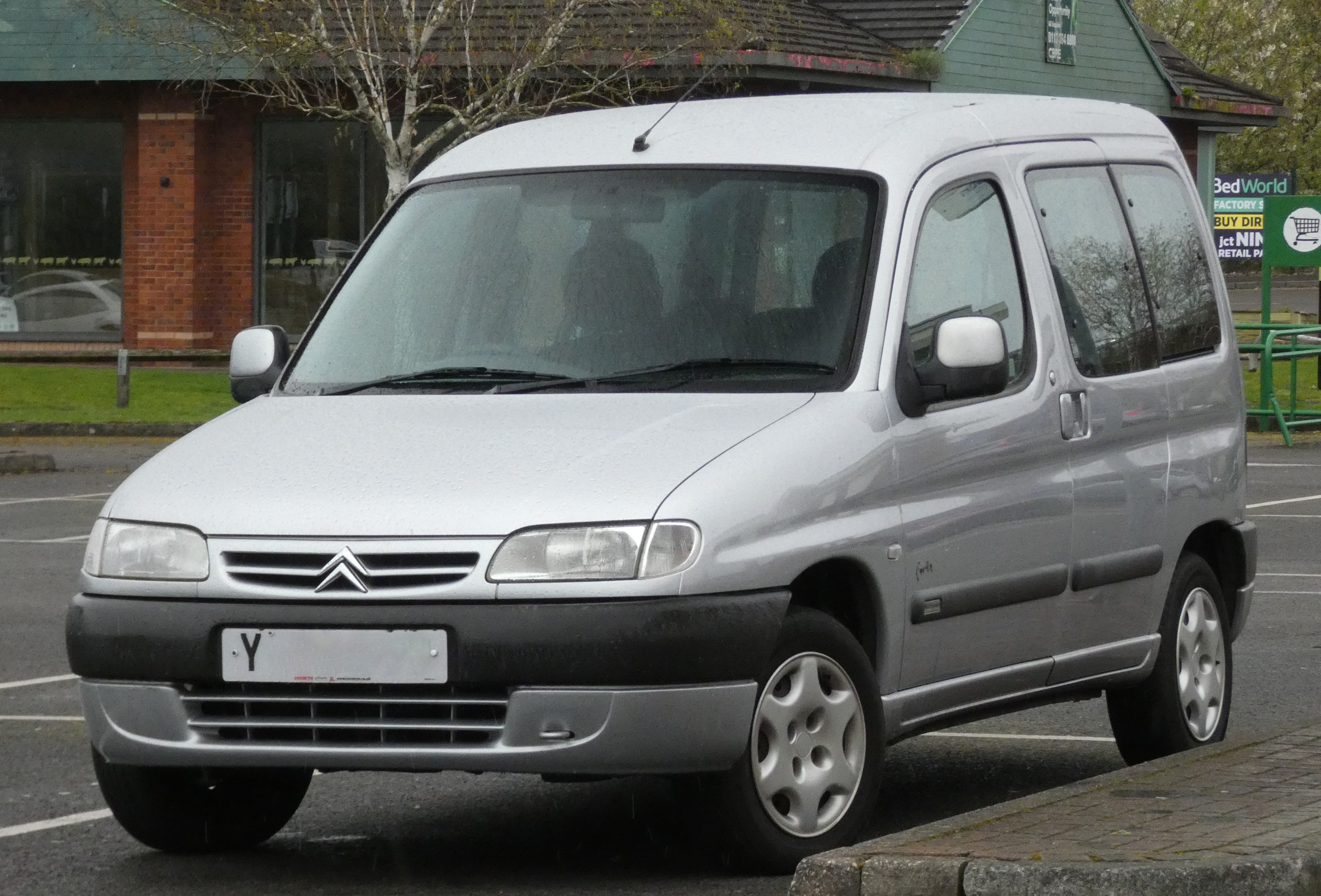
A regular (first generation) Citroën Berlingo

The Citroën Berlingo électrique and Peugeot Partner électrique is a battery-powered version of the first-generation Berlingo range of vans, built and sold between 1998 and 2005. It has a 162 V Saft NiCd battery, a 28 kW Leroy Somer electric motor and has a maximum speed of 95 km/h (59 mph), with a maximum range of 95 km (59 mi) in typical driving. It replaces the C15 électrique.

== Overview ==
As the van was designed from the outset as a petrol, diesel and electric powered vehicle, the instrumentation and controls are very similar to a conventional petrol/diesel van.

After production of the Berlingo électrique was discontinued in 2005, the first-generation Berlingo was fitted with an electric drivetrain developed by Venturi Automobiles that included a ZEBRA molten-salt battery; the resulting Citroën Berlingo First Electric "Powered by Venturi" were delivered to La Poste (France) starting in 2010, but not to general consumers.

It was succeeded in 2013 by the Citroën Berlingo Electric, based on the second-generation Berlingo, which was fitted with an electric drivetrain derived from the Mitsubishi i-MiEV. In 2021, the ë-Berlingo was introduced, based on the third-generation Berlingo and using a drivetrain developed internally by the PSA Group.

== Specifications ==
=== Dimensions and capacities ===
The interior cargo area measures 1,140 mm (45 in) high, with a load length of 1,700 mm (67 in) and width of 1,190 mm (47 in) between the wheel housings. Liftover height is 570 mm (22 in) from the ground. The gross vehicle weight rating is 1,966 kg (4,334 lb), providing a maximum payload of 500 kg (1,100 lb), including the weight of the driver.

=== Powertrain ===
The electric traction motor develops its maximum torque of 180 N⋅m (130 lbf⋅ft) between 0 and 1600 RPM; maximum power is 28 kW (38 hp), delivered between 1600 and 5500 RPM. The continuous power rating is 15.5 kW (20.8 hp); the motor operates at a nominal 400 V. It is a brushed DC electric motor ("continuous current with separate excitation") which requires periodic maintenance to replace the carbon brushes.

The high-voltage storage battery uses 27 nickel-cadmium modules, each operating at 6 V and with a capacity of 100 A-hr, giving the total series-connected assembly a nominal voltage of 162 V and a storage capacity of 16.2 kW-hr. Average consumption is 26 kWh/100 km (81 mpg‑e).

The Berlingo électrique is equipped with direct drive transmission; the electric motor turns the wheels directly through a reduction gear set. The vehicle is often mistakenly described as having an "automatic" gearbox whereas in reality the very wide power range of the electric motor when compared with the very narrow power band of an Internal Combustion Engine means that more than one gear is unnecessary. The Berlingo électrique has in effect only one forward gear which serves from 0-70 mph (110 km/h). The driving mode selector looks similar to an automatic gearbox selector but is limited to Drive, Neutral, Reverse and Park.

=== Speed and range ===
Numerous factors affect energy consumption, including terrain, weather, vehicle speed, and controller efficiency. The actual maximum range will depend on the driving style, especially the speed. This is because atmospheric drag is non-linear with speed, i.e., increasing the speed by 25% will decrease the range by 36%. To get the most range for any electric vehicle (and to some extent petrol/diesel vehicles) involves driving at the slowest practical speed. For example, with the Berlingo, energy consumption when driven gently at a slow speed of 35 mph (56 km/h) can be 250 Wh/mi (130 mpg‑e), but consumption can increase to 600 Wh/mi (56 mpg‑e) if driven faster. When driven faster than 50 mph (80 km/h), the Berlingo électrique controller starts to heat up and becomes less efficient.

Typical ranges are as follows.

Speed	Range Per Charge
56 km/h (35 mph)	96 km (60 miles)
64 km/h (40 mph)	82 km (51 miles)
80 km/h (50 mph)	58 km (36 miles)
96 km/h (60 mph)	48 km (30 miles)

As with any vehicle, driving in rain and snow increases rolling resistance and therefore decreases the miles-per-gallon for petrol/diesel and reduces the miles-per-charge for electric vehicles. Typical reduction in efficiency is about 15%.

== Operation ==
=== Starting ===
The ignition key controls the expected functions as a conventionally-powered car; turning the key clockwise through its detents enable accessories at the first stop, then the ignition circuit at the second stop; beyond the second stop, the starting circuit is engaged.

The function of the ignition position (second detent) is slightly different from regular cars as only the STOP and handbrake warning lights (if the handbrake is applied) are displayed. In the conventional Berlingo all the indicator lights are shown at the ignition position to check bulb condition.

When the ignition key is moved to the start position, which is spring-loaded and returns to the second (ignition) detent, the main traction battery relay is energised, causing an audible clunk, and the traction battery is connected to the motor. The STOP warning light is extinguished, and after either the Drive or Reverse position is selected, the accelerator can be used to move the vehicle as normal. If the traction battery plug is connected, the STOP warning light flashes and the vehicle is unable to start. Similarly, if the accelerator is being pressed, or the vehicle is not stationary, the vehicle is unable to start.

When the Drive position is selected, the green forward gear warning lamp in the instrument panel will illuminate. When the Reverse position is selected, the orange reverse gear warning lamp will illuminate.

=== Instrumentation ===
The instrument panel features two large round analog gauges, with an analog arc-shaped "Téconoscope"/"Econoscope" between them. The left-hand gauge is a conventional speedometer, while the right-hand gauge provides state of charge information. The Téconoscope provides instantaneous energy flow information; the needle goes to the center ("0") when the vehicle is at rest, moving to the left ("ECO") when energy is being returned to the battery, and to the right (in green, orange, or red zones) to indicate the rate of charge depletion. There is a warning lamp at the far left position of the Téconoscope, which lights when vehicle performance has been limited, either due to low state of charge or when temperature limits have been reached.

The large energy meter display shows remaining energy as a percentage and is surprisingly accurate. The good accuracy is provided by the onboard controller monitoring the Amp-hours in and out of the battery rather than the battery voltage. Besides the Téconoscope limited-performance warning light, there is a "traction battery discharged" warning lamp which is designed to illuminate when the state of charge falls below 20%; however, it is operated by the battery voltage. This can mean that the low energy light does not always illuminate at exactly the same percentage charge across different vehicles or even the same vehicle at different times.

Rectangular warning lights at the bottom of the instrument panel are grouped in three clusters within a single row and include:

Name (color)	Door-open warning (red)	Rear foglamp (amber)	Dipped beam (green)	Main beam (blue)	
Purpose	Illuminates when key is in ignition position; extinguishes when doors are closed properly.	Rear warning light is illuminated	Headlights are in dipped position (normal driving)	Headlights are in main position (extra illumination, but may dazzle other drivers)	
Name (color)	Traction battery charge (green)	Traction battery discharged (amber)	Low heater fuel level (amber)	Auxiliary battery charge failure (red)	STOP (red)
Purpose	Flashes when charging	Illuminates when Power Gauge shows state of charge ≤ 20%	Illuminates when ≤ 2 L (0.44 imp gal; 0.53 US gal) of fuel remain	Indicates a fault in the 12 V battery for accessories and vehicle electronics	Illuminates when switched to ignition position to indicate traction motor and battery are not connected; extinguished when traction battery relay closes. Flashes to indicate charging plug still connected.
Name (color)		Electrical fault (amber)	Handbrake and low brake fluid level (red)	Low traction battery water level (amber)	
Purpose		Indicates a fault has been detected by the engine control unit; dealer service recommended	Illuminates when handbrake is on, brake fluid level is low, or a fault has been detected in the regenerative braking system	Indicates battery water level is low	

=== Heating ===
In order to minimise battery usage, a petrol driven heater produced by Webasto is fully integrated to vehicle. It typically takes 5 to 10 minutes to warm and provides excellent cabin heating. It takes several minutes for the heater to run down and will therefore continue to operate after the ignition is turned off.

The heater fuel tank has a capacity of 8 L (1.8 imp gal; 2.1 US gal). Typical fuel consumption rate is 0.5 L/h (0.11 imp gal/h; 0.13 gal/h).

=== Brakes ===
When the accelerator is released, regenerative braking returns kinetic energy to the traction battery.

Power assisted brakes are supplied as standard. However, because the vacuum supply from the engine inlet manifold that normally supplies the brake servo is not available on an electric vehicle, a dedicated vacuum pump is used. Typical operation of the vacuum pump is on for 10–15 seconds and off for a couple of minutes. When the ignition is switched off, braking is not power-assisted.

When the very powerful regenerative braking is active the brake lights are not illuminated. This can be disconcerting for other drivers who may not notice the van slowing significant without the help of the brake lights. The manual states that with a full blown PSA service terminal, brake light operation during regenerative braking can be set to "on" though, while it is set to "off" by default.

=== Power steering ===
Power steering is supplied as standard. However, because the continuous rotation of the engine is not available on an electric vehicle, an electric motor is used to power a power steering hydraulic pump.

== Maintenance ==
=== Charging ===
Charging may be performed using a domestic power connector, using a cord stored underneath the passenger's seat. In the UK, the domestic power supply socket should supply 230 V and 16 A, be earthed, and differential current protected (30 mA). With a 230 V/16 A supply, it takes approximately seven to eight hours to replenish the traction battery to 100% when starting from 20% with a domestic connection.

Rapid charging is possible using an Avcon connector to the vehicle inlet on the front wing. The vehicle inlet door acts as a switch, so charging does not start until the switch is closed; there is a small flap to accommodate the connector handle. Rapid charging stops when the traction battery has reached 80% state of charge. If the state of charge is 80% or greater, rapid charging is not possible. With a 150 A supply, the vehicle replenishes approximately 20% state of charge every eight minutes with rapid charging.

The manual does not indicate that removing the charging plug before it is fully charged can illuminate the 'Electrical Fault Light' which stays on until a full trickle charge is performed. This can be quite disconcerting as the manual states the car has to be taken to the dealer to reset the problem. Also, one cannot, or should not, perform a fast charge when it is in this state.

=== Service items ===
The Electrique is a simple vehicle with minimal servicing requirements. Under the front bonnet, the auxiliary/accessory battery can be accessed, along with the fusebox and several vehicle fluids (windshield washer, power steering, coolant, and brake). Servicing information is available at Citroën Berlingo Electrique Service Manual

Synthetic hydraulic brake fluid should be changed every two years or 60,000 km (37,000 mi), whichever is sooner.

Original equipment tyres are sized 165/70 R14, and should be inflated to 41 psi (2.8 bar).

Battery watering must be done at regular intervals (approximately every 4,000 miles (6,400 km), depending on usage) and this can be done either at a dealership or by using a kit provided by a third party.

Brush replacement should also be done according to the maintenance schedule, as serious damage will result if it is overlooked.

=== Common DIY enhancements ===
The basic Electrique does not come with rear seats or windows. It is common for owners to install a compatible rear seat and rear windows from a conventional Berlingo I Multispace, in countries where this is allowed (not in France).

== Availability ==
Besides in its country of origin, France, the Electrique was made available in at least the following countries.

- Sweden
- United Kingdom
- Denmark
- Norway
- Belgium
- Switzerland

== Similar vehicles ==
The Berlingo électrique is rather similar to the 1992-93 Ford Ecostar, although the Berlingo replaces the older 1991 Citroën C15 électrique.

A Peugeot badged version of this vehicle was marketed as the Peugeot Partner Electric. Battery electric versions of the popular Peugeot 106 and Citroën Saxo super-minis were developed.

During the time when the Citroën Berlingo Electrique was marketed it had no other comparable goods vehicle rival. Since production ended the Nice Car Company has marketed a mini van and Modec has developed an electric commercial vehicle with a 2 tonne payload.

=== Dynavolt Hybrid prototype ===
In 1998, a hybrid prototype was developed called the Berlingo Dynavolt. It utilized the Electrique base but had 23 nickel-cadmium batteries instead to fit a LPG fueled, 500cc twin engine, made by Lombardini, to be used as a range extender to charge the batteries.

It came after the Saxo Dynavolt prototype that unveiled at the Paris Motor Show in October 1998, and was unveiled at the Geneva Motor Show in March 1999. The difference is that where the Saxo had a very new style of two stroke direct injected gas engine which fit underneath the back seats, the Berlingo had a more conventional four stroke design that sat underneath the hood next to the electric motor, but was fueled by LPG. The engine only ran when necessary to avoid polluting, a focus Citroën wanted when designing the car. The Dynavolt could determine when to run the engine based on charge percentage and distance to the destination via an installed GPS or when put into emergency mode, it will turn on the engine to give just the right amount of power to keep going.

== See also ==
- Alcatel-Lucent
- Wikibooks:Citroën Berlingo Electrique Service Manual
- Wikibooks:Citroën Berlingo Electrique Owners Manual
