= Ambri Inc. =

American battery company

Ambri Incorporated
- Formerly: Liquid Metal Battery Corporation
- Company type: Private
- Founder: Donald Sadoway
- Headquarters: Marlborough, Massachusetts, U.S.
- Products: Batteries for Renewable Energy storage
- Website: ambri.com

Ambri Incorporated is an American startup company which aims to produce molten-salt batteries for energy storage in wind and solar power systems. In 2016 it had thirty-seven employees.

== History ==
The Liquid Metal Battery Corporation was formed in 2010 to commercialize the liquid-metal battery technology invented by Professor Donald Sadoway and Dr. David Bradwell at the Massachusetts Institute of Technology. It was renamed Ambri in 2012. In 2012 and 2014, it received $40 million in funding from Bill Gates, Khosla Ventures, Total S.A., and GVB.

In September 2015 the company deferred plans for commercial sales of its batteries, and laid off a quarter of its workforce. In 2016 it hoped to develop a calcium-antimony battery.

In 2020, Ambri signed a contract with TerraScale to deliver a 250 MWh energy storage installation for a data center to be built in Churchill County, Nevada near Fernley.

In 2021, Reliance Industries announced that one of its subsidiaries along with Bill Gates and others, would invest $144 million in Ambri. Reliance is also in talks with Ambri to set up manufacturing and distribution facility in India.

In September of 2023, despite receiving $144 million in funding 2 years earlier, Ambri announced it will be forced to lay off 105 workers, unless it can raise additional funding on or before November 13, 2023.

In May 2024, Ambri filed for Chapter 11 bankruptcy protection, claiming that it had run through all of its cash received by investors, which included firms that were linked to Bill Gates and John Paulson. The company currently has plans to sell itself to noteholders, and will remain operational during the bankruptcy proceedings.

In June 2024, Ambri will be auctioned under US Bankruptcy Court, District of Delaware (Wilmington), case 24-10952. Under Ambri's proposed auction rules, noteholders of Ambri's debt will make an initial bid worth $38 million, using the debt owed to them in lieu of cash. By June 20, if no higher bid is received, noteholders will cancel the debt and take over Ambri. This move will effectively wipe out all equity held by other investors and founders including founder, Donald Sadoway.

== See also ==
- Liquid Metal Batteries
