= Modec =

UK electric vehicle manufacturer

Modec Limited
- Type: Private
- Industry: Manufacturing
- Founded: October 2004
- Defunct: March 2011
- Fate: Assets & IP sold to Navistar International
- Headquarters: Coventry, United Kingdom
- Key people: Jamie Borwick, (Chairman); Bill Gillespie, (CEO)
- Products: Zero Emission Commercial Vehicles
- Revenue: Undisclosed
- Net income: Undisclosed
- Number of employees: 70 (2007)
- Website: www.modeczev.com

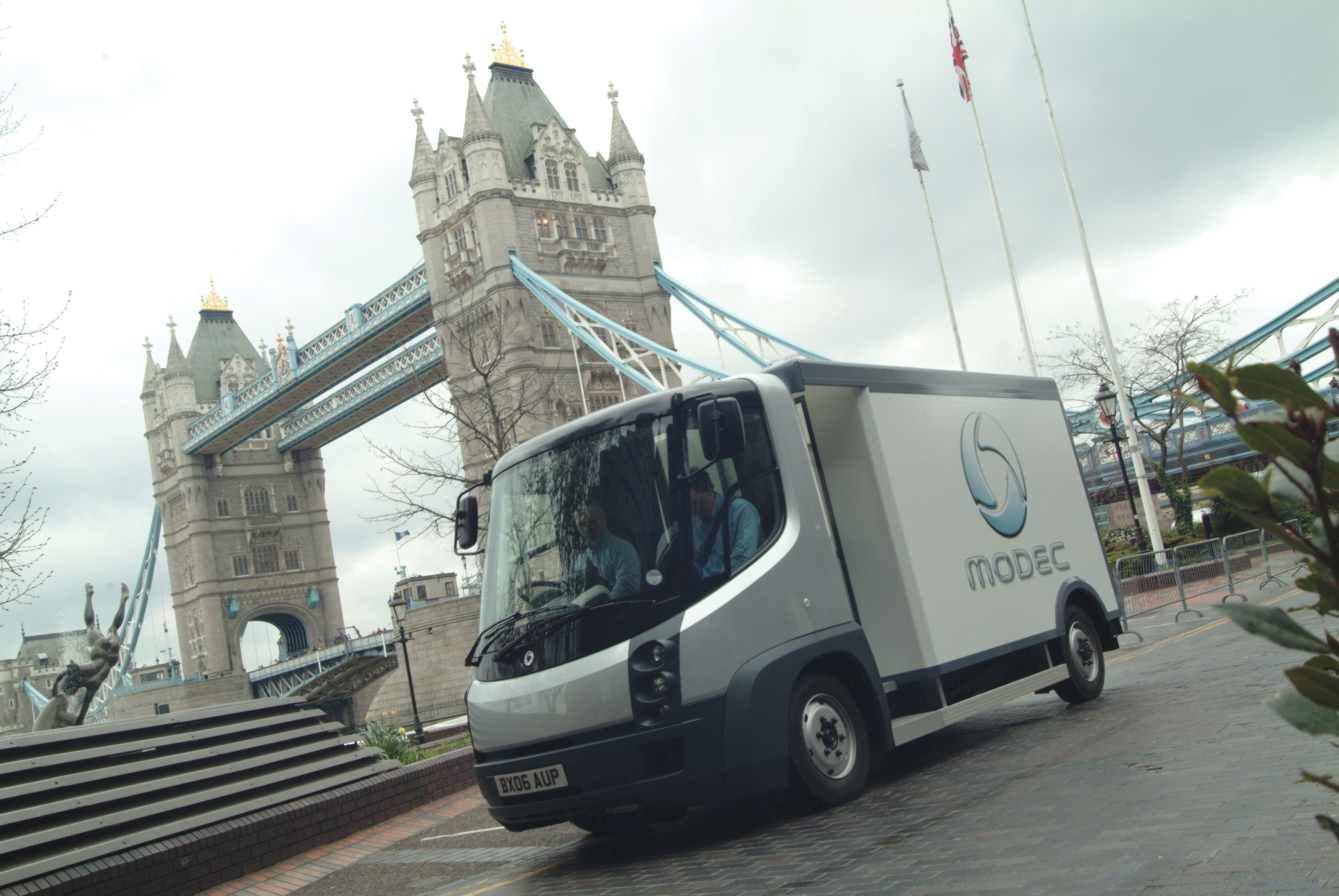
Modec van in London

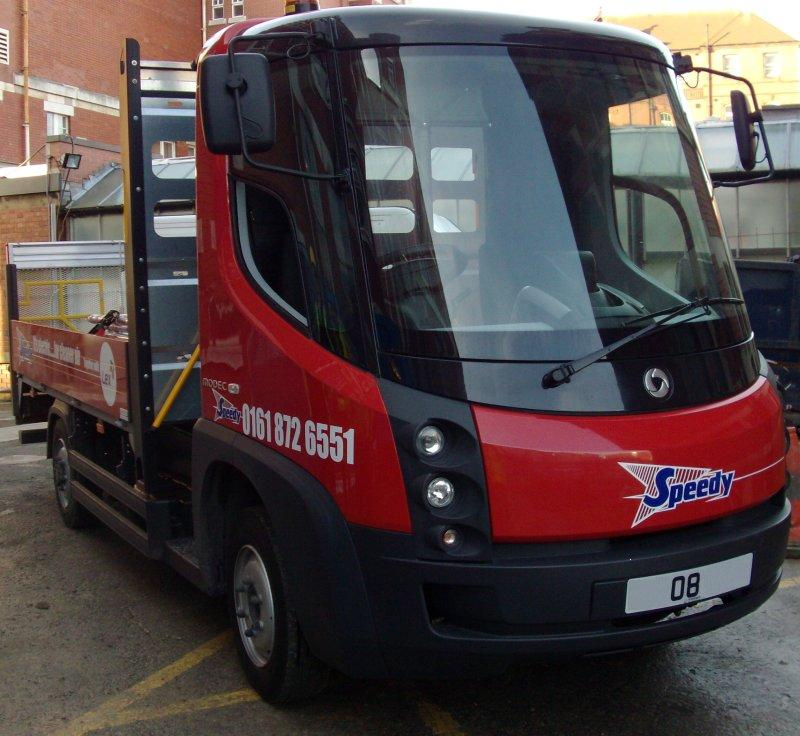
In Manchester

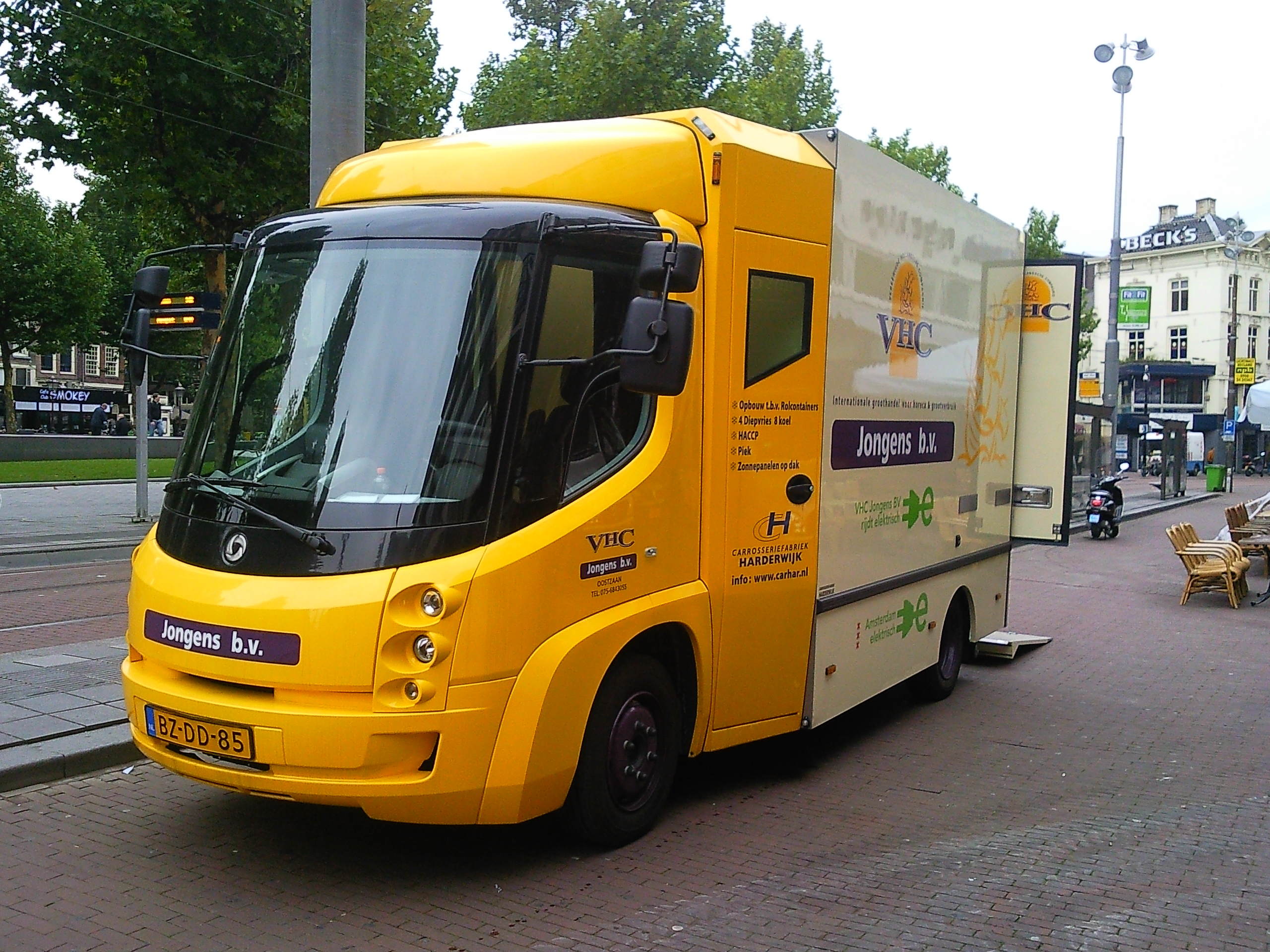
Modec van in Amsterdam

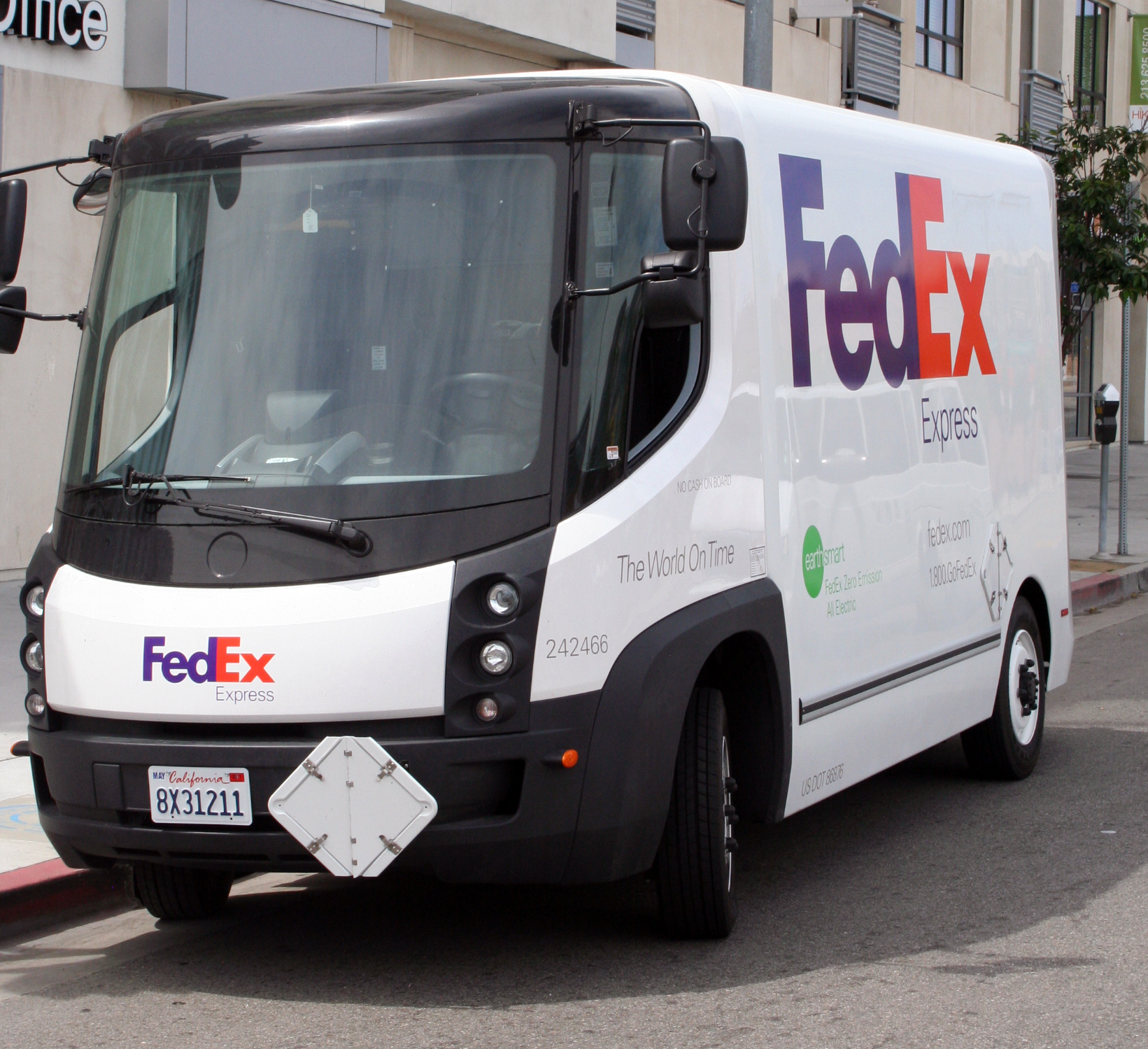
Navistar eStar electric van in Los Angeles in 2010. The vehicle was manufactured in the U.S. under license from Modec.

Modec was an electric vehicle manufacturer in Coventry, in the United Kingdom, specialising in Commercial vehicles in the N2 category. It unveiled its first model in April 2006 and announced its intention to commence series production in March 2007, with the first production vehicles destined for Tesco. Following a long-term decline in sales, it entered administration in March 2011, with all remaining assets and intellectual property sold to Navistar International.

== History ==
2002
eMercury project commenced within London Taxis International (a subsidiary of Manganese Bronze Holdings). The project was led by Jevon Thorpe, designer of the TX1London Taxi. Some development funding received from the Energy Savings Trust (EST), part of the Department of Trade and Industry.

2004
Three eMercury prototypes demonstrated - one conventional lead-acid battery powered, one hybrid vehicle utilising a nickel metal hydride battery and one utilising a high energy molten salt battery mounted in a removable cassette between the chassis rails.
Manganese Bronze Holdings announces its decision to focus on its taxi business. The eMercury project bought by Jamie Borwick, former CEO & Chairman of Manganese Bronze, who creates Modec Limited as part of Borwick Group.
Splits with drivetrain supplier Azure Dynamics, in favour of Zytek, commences development of production vehicles

2006
Announces partnerships with Lex Logistics for customer service, GE Commercial Finance for vehicle finance and battery rental and Axeon Power for battery cassette assemblies containing Zebra battery technology.
Unveils next generation of production intent vehicles at SMMT Commercial Vehicle Show. Fitted with an 85 kWh battery pack, they have a 2-2.5 tonne payload, a governed top speed of 50 mph and a range in excess of 100 miles on a typical urban duty cycle. Maximum torque of 300 Newton metres is delivered from rest, resulting in lively acceleration. Zebra batteries are used.

2007
Coventry production facility officially opened by David Cameron MP.
Announcement of that the first vehicles built will be delivered to Tesco for home grocery deliveries.
Other deliveries included Center Parcs at their Elveden Forest park for servicing use, Accord, Amey, Speedy Hire, Hildon Water, London Borough of Islington and others.

2008
100th Modec vehicle produced, production at the Coventry plant ramping up according to plan (maximum capacity 5,000 vehicles per annum).
London dealer network expands to six sites; Distributors appointed in the Netherlands and Ireland
UPS has ordered Modec electric vans for its UK and German fleets. Energy costs play a huge part in the potential profitability of package delivery companies like UPS, DHL and FedEx.

2009
Modec is the first electric vehicle in the N2 class to attain European Whole Vehicle Type Approval. Modec has entered into a joint venture with Navistar International for North and South America. The Joint venture is named Navistar-Modec EV Alliance.

2010
Navistar began deliveries of its eStar electric van manufactured in Wakarusa, Indiana, under licensed technology from Modec's zero-emissions delivery van.

=== Closure ===
Following a long-term decline in sales with a total production of around 400 vehicles, and following the failure of a rescue deal with Navistar, Modec entered administration in March 2011 with debts of over £40M. Navistar subsequently bought the intellectual property rights from administrators Zolfo Cooper.

Following the closure of the business and sale of the assets, Liberty Electric Cars hired the entire Modec engineering team and set up a new subsidiary "Liberty E-Tech". After failing in January 2011 to agree a deal with Navistar to buy the brand, in July 2011 Liberty launched a service called "e-Care" to service and maintain Modec vehicles, which presently covers the UK, France, Germany and Dubai.

== Technical ==
The only product of the Modec company was the Modec EV commercial vehicle. It was produced in three versions; a chassis cab, box van and a dropside. All three shared a common wheelbase of 141.7 in (3.60 m) and a steel ladder frame chassis. The Modec has a kerb weight of 3.3 tonnes and a max gross capacity of 6.05 tonnes.

The vehicles use an 102 bhp (76 kW; 103 PS) motor with 221 lb⋅ft (300 N⋅m) of torque and an exchangeable lead-acid battery which is charged from an external charger that requires a 32amp 3-phase supply to charge the vehicle for 6 hours, it also has options for Lithium-Ion Phosphate or Sodium Nickel chloride batteries.

It has a 100-mile (160 km) range and a 50 mph (80 km/h) top speed.

== See also ==
- Battery electric vehicle
- Electric vehicle
- Smith Electric Vehicles
