= Ambri =

Ambri may refer to:

- Ambrì, a village in Switzerland
- Ambri (company), formerly Liquid Metal Battery Corporation, a company developing liquid-metal batteries
