= NGK (disambiguation) =

NGK may refer to:

Companies

- NGK Corporation, formerly NGK Insulators, is a Japanese ceramics company
- Niterra, formerly NGK Spark Plug, a japanese company that manufactures spark plugs and ceramics
- NGK, Inc. parent company of the Universal Wrestling Federation (Herb Abrams)

Other

- NGK, Nederduitse Gereformeerde Kerk, the Dutch Reformed Church in South Africa, a Reformed Christian denomination in South Africa.
- Dutch Reformed Churches (Nederlandse Gereformeerde Kerken), denomination in the Netherlands
- NGK (film), (Nandha Gopalan Kumaran), a 2019 Indian Tamil-language political action film written and directed by Selvaraghavan.
