= Sodium–sulfur battery =

Type of molten-salt battery

Cut-away schematic diagram of a sodium–sulfur battery

A sodium–sulfur (NaS) battery is a type of molten-salt battery that uses liquid sodium and liquid sulfur electrodes. This type of battery has a similar energy density to lithium-ion batteries and is fabricated from inexpensive and low-toxicity materials. Due to the high operating temperature required (usually between 300 and 350 °C), as well as the highly reactive nature of sodium and sodium polysulfides, these batteries are primarily suited for stationary energy storage applications, rather than for use in vehicles. Molten Na-S batteries are scalable in size: there is a 1 MW microgrid support system on Catalina Island CA (USA) and a 50 MW/300 MWh system in Fukuoka, Kyushu, (Japan).

Despite their very low capital cost and high energy density (300-400 Wh/L), molten sodium–sulfur batteries have not achieved sustained commercial success, compared to lithium-ion batteries. There have been ca. 200 installations totalling 5 GWh were built before NGK, the sole NaS manufacturer, ended production., but these facilities do not appear to be scheduled for expansion. The scale of NaS batteries is dwarfed by the 948 GWh for lithium-ion batteries. Poor market adoption of molten sodium-sulfur batteries has possibly been due to perceived safety and durability issues, such as a short cycle life of fewer than 1000 cycles on average (although there are reports of 15 year operation with 300 cycles per year). In contrast to these concerns, a recent technical data sheet indicates a cycle life of 20 years or 7300 cycles with less than 1% energy degradation per year. Also TÜV Rheinland assessed commercial NaS batteries and their safety features coming to the conclusion that "under practical conditions it is not possible to ignite an intact NGK Insulators NaS battery module (manufactured after 2011) or to trigger other dangerous scenarios from the outside or from within."

== Construction and redox processes ==
Typical batteries have a solid electrolyte membrane between the anode and cathode, compared with liquid-metal batteries where the anode, the cathode and the membrane are liquids.

The cell is usually made in a cylindrical configuration. The entire cell is enclosed by a steel casing that is protected, usually by chromium and molybdenum, from corrosion on the inside. This outside container serves as the positive electrode, while the liquid sodium serves as the negative electrode. The container is sealed at the top with an airtight alumina lid. An essential part of the cell is the presence of a BASE (beta-alumina solid electrolyte) membrane, which selectively conducts Na^{+}. In commercial applications the cells are arranged in blocks for better heat conservation and are encased in a vacuum-insulated box.

The battery operates at about 330 °C, well above the melting point of sulfur at 119 °C and sodium (98 °C). Room-temperature sodium–sulfur batteries are also known. They use neither liquid sodium nor liquid sulfur nor sodium beta-alumina solid electrolyte, but rather operate on entirely different principles and face different challenges than the high-temperature molten NaS batteries discussed here.

Structure of sodium tetrasulfide.

Sodium and sulfur are separated by a beta-alumina solid electrolyte (BASE) membrane. This material enables the NaS and related batteries because BASE is a good conductor of sodium ions (above 250 °C) but an electrical insulator. A similar type of battery called the ZEBRA battery, which uses a solid Ni/NiCl₂ positive electrode with molten NaAlCl₄; unlike NaS, it remains in commercial production

The discharge process for the NaS battery can be represented as follows:

2 Na + 4 S → Na_{2}S_{4} (E_{cell} ~ 2 V)

Written above as Na_{2}S_{4}, the product of the discharge can include Na_{2}S_{6} to Na_{2}S_{5}. The polysulfide anions interchange in rapid equilibria:

S^{2−}_{4} + S^{2−}_{6} ⇌ 2 S^{2−}_{5}

Both Na_{2}S and Na_{2}S_{2}, which have high lattice energy, would crystallize. Therefore reduction of sulfur is only allowed to proceed to the trisulfide level.

== Development ==
Ford Motor Company pioneered the battery in the 1960s to power early-model electric cars. In 1989 Ford resumed its work on a Na-S battery powered electric car, which was named Ford Ecostar. The car had a 100-mile driving range, which was twice as much as any other fully electric car demonstrated earlier. 68 of such vehicles were leased to United Parcel Service, Detroit Edison Company, US Post Office, Southern California Edison, Electric Power Research Institute, and California Air Resources Board. Despite the low materials cost, these batteries were expensive to produce, as the economy of scale was not achieved during that time. Also, the battery life was estimated to be only 2 years. However, the program was terminated in 1995, after two of the leased car batteries caught fire.

=== Incidents ===
Several examples of the Ford Ecostar, equipped with such a battery, burst into flame during recharging, leading Ford to abandon the attempted development of molten NaS batteries for cars. Stationary NaS batteries by NGK Insulators use hermetically sealed cells and multiple safety features on module level, such as sand for fire suppression. According to the manufacturer, these are sufficient to avoid that a fire can spread from one to neighboring cells.

In 2011, a 2000 kilowatt NaS battery system manufactured by NGK Insulators,at the Tsukuba, Japan Mitsubishi Materials Corporation plant caught fire.

=== Challenges ===
Numerous challenges have been identified:

1. sodium metal dendrites. can lead to short-circuiting. In general, a significant threshold current density needs to be exceeded before such rapid Mode I fracture-degradation is initiated.
2. Beta-alumina surface layer on the Na and S sides turns grey after many 100 cycles, increasing the electronic conductivity of the electrolyte.
3. Crack formation due to oxygen depletion

== Applications ==
In 2024, only one company (NGK Insulators) produced molten NaS batteries on a commercial scale. BASF Stationary Energy Storage GmbH, a wholly owned subsidiary of BASF SE, acts as a distributor and development partner for the NaS batteries produced by NGK Insulators. In 2025, NGK discontinued production.

In 2016, the Mitsubishi Electric Corporation commissioned the world's largest sodium–sulfur battery in Fukuoka Prefecture, Japan. The facility offers energy storage to help manage energy levels during peak times with renewable energy sources. In 2025, Duke Energy commissioned a 5 MW, eight-hour sodium–sulfur battery at its Suwannee site in Florida as a pilot to evaluate long-duration grid storage.

== Research ==
=== Space ===
Because of its high energy density, the NaS battery has been proposed for space applications. Sodium–sulfur cells can be made space-qualified: in fact a test sodium-sulfur cell flew on the Space Shuttle. The NaS flight experiment demonstrated a battery with a specific energy of 150 W·h/kg (3 x nickel–hydrogen battery energy density), operating at 350 °C. It was launched on the STS-87 mission in November 1997, and demonstrated 10 days of experimental operation.

The Venus Landsailing Rover mission concept is also considering the use of this type of battery, as the rover and its payload are being designed to function for about 50 days on the hot surface of Venus without a cooling system.

=== Room-temperature sodium–sulfur batteries ===
One of the main shortcomings of traditional sodium–sulfur batteries is that they require high temperatures to operate. This means that they must be preheated before use, and that they will consume some of their stored energy (up to 14%) to maintain this temperature when not in use. Aside from saving energy, room temperature operation mitigates safety issues such as explosions which can occur due to failure of the solid electrolyte during operation at high temperatures. Research and development of sodium–sulfur batteries that can operate at room temperature is ongoing. Despite the higher theoretical energy density of sodium–sulfur cells at room temperature compared to high temperature, operation at room temperature introduces challenges like:

- Poor conductivity of sulfur and sodium polysulfides
- Volume expansion of sulfur, which creates mechanical stresses within the battery
- Low reaction rates between the sodium and sulfur
- Formation of dendrites on the sodium anode which create short-circuits in the battery. This is contributed to by the shuttle effect which is explained below.
- Shorter cycle life which means that the cells must be replaced more often than their high-temperature counterparts.

As of 2009, a lower temperature, solid electrode version was under development in Utah by Ceramatec. They use a NASICON membrane to allow operation at 90 °C with all components remaining solid.

== See also ==
- List of battery types
- Lithium–sulfur battery
- Molten-salt battery
