= Ford Ecostar =

Overview
- Type: Experimental vehicle
- Manufacturer: Ford of Europe
- Production: 1992-1993

Body and chassis
- Body style: 2-door van
- Related: Ford Escort Mk V

Dimensions
- Wheelbase: 102.6 in (2,610 mm)
- Length: 169.3 in (4,300 mm)
- Curb weight: 3,110 lb (1,410 kg)

The Ford Ecostar is an experimental electrically powered small delivery van that was built by the VCC110 Program Team in Dearborn, Michigan. A sodium-sulfur battery in the floor of the cargo area stored power for a 75 horsepower (56 kW) electric motor under the front hood. The Ecostar introduced the road-and-leaf logo now used on a number of Ford products.

Just over 100 Ecostars were produced, and used in fleet tests between 1992 and 1996 with over 1,000,000 miles (1,609,344 km) driven, collectively. The Ecostar averaged 94 miles (151 km) on a full charge, and demonstrated 155 miles (249 km) range in one test. However, on several occasions the battery burst into flame during use. For this, and several other reasons, Ford lost interest in the sodium-sulfur battery and turned to fuel cell concepts instead.

The product niche appeared to be a useful one and has led to a number of similar designs. While the 1998 Citroën Berlingo électrique was almost identical in performance and range, it just replaced the older 1991 C15 électrique. Ford is re-entering the market as well, with an electric version of the Transit Connect.

== History ==
Ford developed the sodium-sulfur battery technology in 1965, but had not continued to develop it for commercial use. Development was later picked up in Europe.

The experimental Ecostar was introduced to help develop all aspects of electric vehicle design, including engineering, supplier development, and market development. A "prototype-of-the-prototypes" was completed with lead acid batteries in 1992, giving a range of 30 mi (48 km); future planned models would include the new battery technology, providing an estimated range of 100 mi (160 km). Several similar models followed and were lent out for test drives with favorable results.

A total of 80 to 105 "production-prototype" sulfur-powered Ecostars were hand-built starting in 1993, and used in fleet trials with several electric utility clients starting the next year, including Southern California Edison, Pacific Gas & Electric, Allegheny Power, Commonwealth Edison, Detroit Edison, and the United States Department of Energy. At the time, the cost of the battery was a significant US$46,000 (equivalent to $103,000 in 2025), and the battery had a life of approximately one calendar year. However, the vehicles were hand-built at a cost of $250,000, so the battery cost was not representative of a production version. The total cost of a 30-month lease was US$100,000 (equivalent to $217,000 in 2025).

The tests ran for 30 months. During the testing period, there were problems with the system, including two vehicles that burst into flame while charging. The sulfur in the battery was flammable, a serious safety risk. The root cause of the fires was leaking sulfur, which corroded the connections between the cells. These corroded connections increased the resistance and the resulting heat was sufficient to melt the surrounding cells and cause a chain reaction. The program team was able to introduce a workaround that permitted the trials to conclude, but future Ford electric vehicles over the next five years would have to rely upon the older lead acid battery. ABB introduced a new version of the battery, but was unwilling to guarantee performance beyond one year.

In late 1997, Ford announced a partnership with Daimler-Benz and Ballard Power Systems to introduce car-ready fuel cells, and their experiments with the sodium-sulfur batteries ended.

== Description ==
The Ecostar's chassis was based on the Escort Van produced by Ford's Halewood Body & Assembly factory outside Liverpool. This was essentially a European Escort Mk V with a raised cargo area forming a 2-door panel van. Fully equipped, it weighed 3,100 pounds (1,406 kg).

A significant portion of that weight was its 780-pound (354 kg) sodium-sulfur battery, which stored 37 kWh. Using the Federal Urban Driving Schedule, this gave the Ecostar a range of 100 miles (161 km). The sodium-sulfur technology was invented by Ford in the 1960s, but the battery for the Ecostar was built by ABB Group in Heidelberg, Germany. The battery operates at a nominal 331 V. In the Ecostar's sodium-sulfur battery, there are 480 individual cells, each contained in an aluminum can 1.5 in (38 mm) in diameter and 18 in (460 mm) long. In order for the battery to work, it had to be maintained at a temperature of 600 °F (316 °C), which keeps the sulfur molten.

To avoid heat loss, and to insulate the cabin from its heat, the battery was stored inside a double-walled stainless steel vacuum flask. This allowed it to maintain its temperature overnight and during cold weather, when traditional batteries are less responsive. Approximately 200 W are required to maintain the battery at operating temperature. The battery container was mounted below the floor pan of the cargo area, which gave the vehicle a low center of gravity that give it well-liked handling. One complaint, however, was the lack of power steering.

The battery supplied power to a three-phase alternating current electric traction motor located under the hood in the area normally used for the gasoline engine. The motor delivered only 75 hp (56 kW), low for a vehicle of this size, but up to 143 lb⋅ft (194 N⋅m) of torque, typical of a much more powerful gasoline engine. This was better torque than the Ford Escort GT, for instance, whose 1.8 litre four-cylinder engine delivered 127 hp (95 kW) but only 114 lb⋅ft (155 N⋅m).

One drawback of the sodium-sulfur battery is its relatively slow discharge rates, which limited the amount of power that could be drawn from the battery during acceleration. Drivers described it as "sedate", while Ford estimated its 0-60 mph (97 km/h) acceleration at about 16.5 seconds. Instrumented testing showed this acceleration time to be 18 to 25 seconds. While slow by car standards, this is similar to other small European delivery vans of the era, like the Volkswagen Eurovan.

While cruising the motor used only 8 kW to maintain speed, about 11 hp. This speaks to the motor-to-wheel efficiency of the electric drivetrain, as well as the 50 psi low-drag tires. However, the long quoted ranges referred only to driving, not accessory systems. These added considerably to the load; the electric heater burned 5 kW, and the air conditioner 6 kW. In real-world driving, using either would significantly impact range.

== See also ==
- Ford introduced the Transit Connect Electric vehicle, similar to the Ecostar, in 2010.
- Ford also made an electric version of the Ford Ranger pickup truck in both 1995 and 1998 and sold or leased almost 2000 of these vehicles.
