= Sodium tetrachloroaluminate =

Sodium chloroaluminate
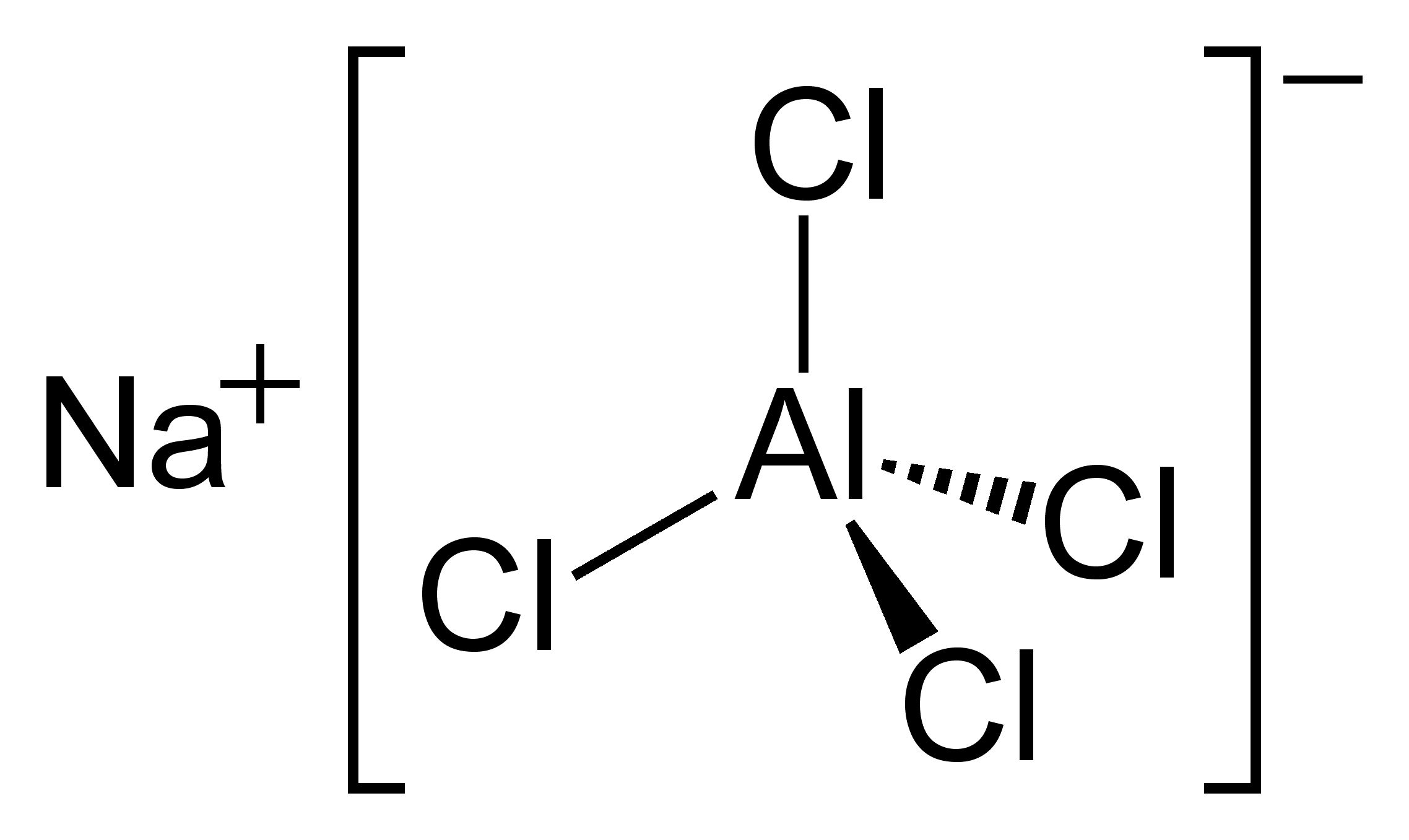

Names
- IUPAC name Sodium chloroaluminate
- Other names Sodium tetrachloroaluminate Natriumchloroaluminat

Identifiers
CAS Number	7784-16-9
3D model (JSmol)	Interactive image
ChemSpider	10686636
ECHA InfoCard	100.029.136
EC Number	232-050-6
PubChem CID	16699350
UNII	9Z6200GDQZ
- InChI: InChI=1S/Al.4ClH.Na/h;4*1H;/q+3;;;;;+1/p-4 Key: CMLRNXGMTZKKSR-UHFFFAOYSA-J
- SMILES: [Na+].[Al-](Cl)(Cl)(Cl)Cl

Properties
Chemical formula	NaAlCl_{4}
Molar mass	191.78331 g/mol
Melting point	157 °C

Hazards
- GHS labelling
Pictograms	(GHS05: Corrosive)
Signal word	Danger
Hazard statements	H314
Precautionary statements	P260, P264, P280, P301+P330+P331, P303+P361+P353, P304+P340, P305+P351+P338, P310, P321, P363, P405, P501

Related compounds
Related salts	Lithium tetrachloroaluminate
- Except where otherwise noted, data are given for materials in their standard state (at 25 °C [77 °F], 100 kPa). verify (what is ?) Infobox references

Sodium tetrachloroaluminate is a chemical compound with the formula NaAlCl_{4}. It is the sodium salt of the tetrachloroaluminate anion. It was discovered by Friedrich Wöhler in 1827.

== Production and uses ==
Sodium tetrachloroaluminate can be prepared from sodium chloride and aluminium trichloride.

In the 19th century, it was produced industrially by carbochlorination of alumina in the presence of sodium chloride, and used as a feedstock to produce aluminium in the Deville process.

Molten sodium tetrachloroaluminate is used as an electrolyte in sodium-nickel chloride batteries.

== See also ==
- Sodium aluminate
- Sodium hexafluoroaluminate
- Sodium tetrafluoroborate
