= Beta-alumina solid electrolyte =

Fast-ion-conductor material

Beta-alumina solid electrolyte (BASE) is a fast ion conductor material used as a membrane in several types of molten salt electrochemical cell. Currently there is no known substitute available. β-Alumina exhibits an unusual layered crystal structure which enables very fast ion transport. β-Alumina is not an isomorphic form of aluminium oxide (Al_{2}O_{3}), but a sodium polyaluminate. It is a hard polycrystalline ceramic, which, when prepared as an electrolyte, is complexed with a mobile ion, such as Na^{+}, K^{+}, Li^{+}, Ag^{+}, H^{+}, Pb^{2+}, Sr^{2+} or Ba^{2+} depending on the application. β-Alumina is a good conductor of its mobile ion yet allows no non-ionic (i.e., electronic) conductivity. The crystal structure of the β-alumina provides an essential rigid framework with channels along which the ionic species of the solid can migrate. Ion transport involves hopping from site to site along these channels. Since the 1970s this technology has been thoroughly developed, resulting in interesting applications. Its special characteristics on ion and electrical conductivity make this material extremely interesting in the field of energy storage.

== Solid electrolyte ==
β-alumina is a solid electrolyte. Solid-state electrolytes are solids with high ionic conductivity, comparable to those of molten salts. Solid-state electrolytes have applications in electrical energy storage and various sensors. They can be used in supercapacitors, fuel cells and solid-state batteries, substituting liquid electrolytes used in for example the lithium-ion battery. The solid electrolyte contains highly mobile ions, allowing the movement of ions. The ions move by hopping through the otherwise rigid crystal. The main advantage of solid electrolytes over liquid ones are increased safety and higher power density.

== History ==
BASE was first developed by researchers at the Ford Motor Company, in the search for a storage device for electric vehicles while developing the sodium–sulfur battery. The compound β-alumina was already discovered in 1916 and the structure was quite well known by the end of the 1930s. The term "beta-alumina" is a misnomer, since it is not an aluminium oxide (Al_{2}O_{3}), but a sodium polyaluminate. Before the 1970s, β-alumina was mainly used in the construction of industrial furnaces. At the Ford Motor Company, researchers (Yung-Fang YuYao, J. T. Kummer and Neill Weber) rediscovered the high ionic conductivity of β-alumina, which meant it could be used as solid electrolyte. Ford Motor company was interested to use the material in the sodium–sulfur battery they were developing for electrical vehicles. In the early 1970s, instigated by the oil crisis, most research focused on industrial application of β-alumina in energy storage solutions. Soon β-alumina became also a model to study high ionic conductivity, and a lot of theoretical research in the exact mechanisms underlying the conductivity was undertaken in the 1970s and 1980s. The sodium–sulfur battery was a topic of intense worldwide interest during the 1970s and 1980s, but interest in the technology for vehicle use diminished for a variety of technical and economic reasons. Its "successor", the sodium nickel chloride battery, is of commercial interest. The sodium nickel chloride battery (or ZEBRA battery) has been under development for almost 20 years.

== Structure ==
When first discovered, β-alumina was thought to be a polymorph of $\ce{\alpha-Al_2O_3}$( Aluminium oxide), and was subsequently named $\ce{\beta-Al_2O_3}$. In 1931 it was realized sodium was also part of the structure. The crystal consists of closely packed 'spinel' blocks, separated by loosely-packed conduction planes. The spinel blocks are linked by $\ce{Al-O-Al}$ bonds. These conduction planes contain mobile sodium ions, which makes the β-alumina an ionic conductor. β-alumina is generally non-stoichiometric. The general formula is given by $\ce{Na_{1+x}Al_{11}O_{17+x/2}}$, with $x$ the excess of sodium atoms, balanced by an excess of $x/2$ oxygen atoms. $x=0$ would be the stoichiometric compound, but is normally not stable. Generally $x$ is around 0.3. The ions $\ce{K+, Ag+, Tl+, NH_4+, H_3O+}$ can replace the sodium in the conduction layer.

Three important sites for the conduction mechanism in the conduction planes have been identified. These are three possible positions for the sodium ion, named Bever-Ross (BR), anti-Bever-Ross (aBR) and mid-oxygen (mO). The first two are named after the scientist who first identified these positions. The last is named mid-oxygen, as it is the position exactly between two oxygen ions in the conduction plane. These three position are at $\left ( \frac{2}{3}\ \frac{1}{3}\ \frac{1}{4} \right )$, $\left ( 0\ 0\ \frac{1}{4}\right )$ and$\left( \frac{5}{6}\ \frac{1}{6}\ \frac{1}{4} \right)$ respectively, when taking one of the symmetry points as the origin. The sodium ion is most likely at the BR position, but all three sites are important for the conduction in B-alumina. The sodium ions hop between these sites in the conduction plane.

There are two main, structural different compounds, β-alumina and β"-alumina. There are a few other compounds identified, but these are all structurally very similar to either β- or β"-alumina. β-alumina is the name for this specific structure, but is also used to describe the general class of β-alumina material including β"-alumina. β-alumina, the specific structure, has hexagonal symmetry. Its unit cell consists of two spinel blocks, including two adjacent conduction planes. The conduction planes are mirror planes. β"-alumina has a quite similar structure, but the stacking of the different planes is slightly different. It has rhombohedral symmetry and its unit cell consists of three spinel blocks, including adjacent conduction planes. Its unit cell is therefore about 1.5 times as long along the c-axis. The conduction planes can contain more sodium ions than β-alumina and it has lower energy barriers for hopping between the different sides in the conduction plane. β"-alumina has therefore generally a higher conductivity than β-alumina and is the preferred phase for electrolyte applications.

== Conduction ==
β-alumina is a good ionic conductor, but a bad electronic conductor, with a bandgap of about 9 eV. The ions can only move in the 2D conduction planes in the crystal, perpendicular to the c-axis. There are two important characteristics of β-alumina, that causes the high ionic conductivity. The first one is the non-stoichiometry, so the excess of positively charged ions (cations), such as sodium ions. These ions are not restricted to specific lattice sites and act as the charge carriers. In normal ionic material, these defects need to be created before it conducts, making the activation energy for conduction several eV's higher. The second property is the high disorder of the mobile ions inside the otherwise rigid lattice. In normal ($x \approx 0.3$) non-stoichiometric β-alumina the mobile ions can migrate easily to different sites, because of low energy barriers, even at room temperature. The ions can diffuse through the conduction slab. Usual ($x\approx 0.3$) non-stoichiometric β-alumina has no long range order for the mobile ions, in contrast with stoichiometric ($x = 1$) β-alumina, and consequently has higher conductivity. β''-alumina has generally a higher conductivity than β-alumina, because it has a higher concentration of sodium ions in the conduction plane and lower energy barriers.

The mobile ions move through the conduction plane by hopping between the different possible sites (BR, aBR, mO). The conduction paths between these sites form a honeycomb network in the conduction plane, with small energy barriers between the different sites. In β-alumina, in contrast to β"-alumina, the gap between oxygen atoms is generally too small for larger alkali ions, such as $\ce{K+}$. The conduction mechanism involves the hopping of two or more ions simultaneous, explaining the low activation energy and high ionic conductivity.

== Production ==
For the large-scale and cost-efficient energy storage needs, sodium batteries operating at high temperatures are showing signs of success. The ion-conductive β-alumina plays a key part in the battery cells performance, requiring development of optimal microstructure and purity to ensure beneficial electrical and mechanical properties.

Current high-end manufacturing methods for producing the β-alumina electrolytes includes: isostatic pressing and electrophoretic deposition (EDP).

Isostatic pressing is the process where casting are pressed into compact solids using a mould and pressure. Eletrophoretic deposition is the process where migrating colloidal particles suspended in a medium using an electrical field to get the desired material.

Both processes, although resulting in good products, require numerous steps to create a batch, contributing significantly to the battery cost. A large-volume production desires a simplified low cost and continuous process. This is offered by extrusion.

Extrusion, pressing stock material through a die to get the desired cross-section in the final product, offers this possibility. Currently it shows promising results with acceptable ceramic quality having potential to significantly lower manufacturing costs.

== Applications ==
In the past decades several devices based on β-alumina have been researched for energy conversion and storage. The relevant properties of β-alumina solid electrolytes are high ionic conductivity, but low electronic transference number and chemical passivity. It is also able to be formed into useful shapes.

=== Sodium–sulfur battery ===
Research and development on the sodium–sulphur cell has reached a point where this technology is now commercialised. Average units have power output in the range from 50 -400 kWh. Its lifetime is estimated to be around 15 years, around 4500 cycles at an efficiency of 85%. The quick response times, claimed speeds in the order of 1 ms, add to the overall utility of the battery. A high temperature of 300-400 degrees Celsius is needed during operation

Sodium–sulphur batteries have a basis of molten salt technology where molten sodium and sulphur are used as the electrodes of the battery. A high temperature of 300-400 degrees Celsius is needed during operation for the components to remain molten. The electricity is generated in such a way that, during discharge, metal atoms are released form the sodium moving to the positive electrode through the electrolyte. The electrolyte consists of a beta-alumina tube. Due to the fast and efficient ion transportation, β-alumina allows the battery to function at these high speeds and efficiency.

The application of these batteries are commonly in the field of renewable energy, the main function being peak shaving and energy stabilization. For this purpose the high ion transport beta-alumina provides is crucial.

=== Sodium amalgam-halogen cell ===
The development of a new high energy density class of primary cells using β-alumina membranes has been an advancing process. These cells intended to function at room temperature and exhibit long shelf and operating lifetime. Intended applications are for example pacemakers and electronic watches.

=== Sodium Heat engine ===
In the heart of a sodium heat engine, a beta alumina ceramic tubular membrane is placed at the centre. The system can be viewed as a sodium vapor cell where a differential in pressure is controlled by two heat reservoirs. The temperature difference between the two regions gives rise to a certain sodium activity differential, the sodium expands almost isothermally. Since the beta alumina electrolyte does not conduct electrons favourably the expansion causes sodium ions across the membrane and the electrons through an external circuit. At a porous electrode the ions are neutralized on the low pressure side, the neutral atoms evaporate through a vapor chamber ending up in a condenser. The cooled liquid sodium is then pumped back to the high temperature region. For this application beta alumina is especially applicable, since the most efficient features of the heat engine are a result form the properties of the work fluid.

The heat engine application calls for an electrolyte with long-term durability. This is one of the features that hot sodium gives, electrolyte resistivity is particularly low at high operating temperature. Since the conversion efficiency is almost independent of size, this heat engine has a modular form and could form a candidate for local generation of power in energy systems. To date it has seen most application in combination with solar-thermal-electric systems.

== Current research ==
=== ZEBRA ===
The ZEBRA battery (zero emission batteries research activity) is a sodium nickel chloride battery was considered in the past for both stationary energy storage and electric vehicle applications. The main drawback of these batteries is that they operate at 300 degrees Celsius, when the vehicle is not in use it needs an external heat source to keep the battery operational. It has been researched if this external heating will use more energy than ambient temperature batteries. The conclusion was that the ZEBRA battery does not use more electricity than a traditional battery due to the variation in daily driving habits. The most efficient use case for this battery would therefore be in fields where the battery sees the most usage, such as public transport.

Stationary energy storage, particularly the segments with 2-12 h half cycle time, appear to be well-suited for sodium-beta alumina batteries. General Electric attempted to commercialized ZEBRA batteries for stationary energy storage in 2011–2015, but failed to do so. It appears, that the reasons for the GE's failure were economical rather than technical.

=== Doping ===
Currently the research on the topic of doping the crystal structure of the solid electrolyte could lead to more favourable characteristics of the material. When adding iron over the composition range, it could reach higher ionic conductivity with respect to the undoped version. The concentration and type of dopant are the variables that can change the properties of the material. Using high amounts of doping has as counterproductive negative effect that the electrical conductivity of the electrolyte rises. Research is focussed on finding the trade-off between ionic and electrical conductivity.
