= NGK Corporation =

Japanese ceramics company

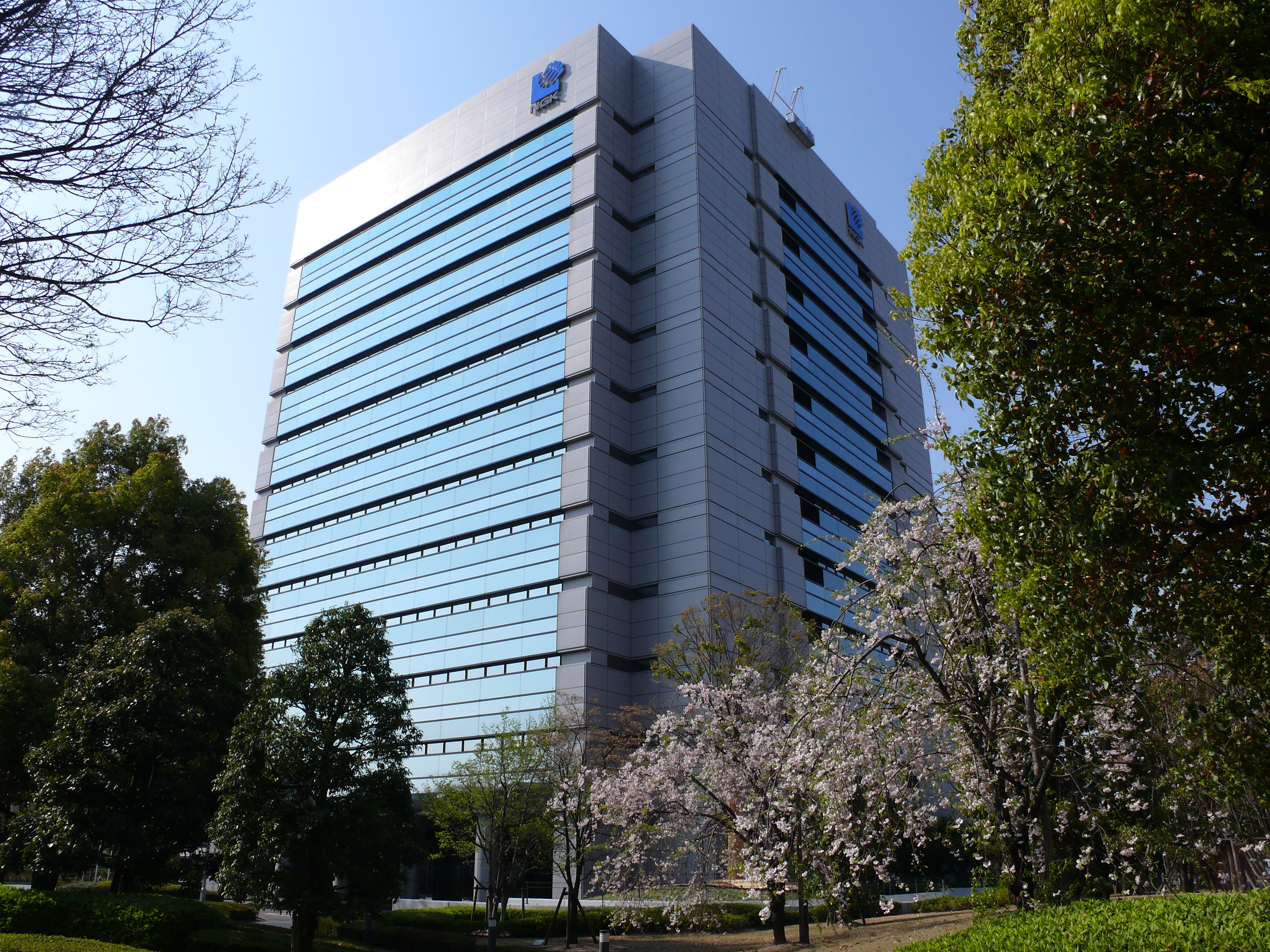
- The headquarters in Nagoya
- Native name: NGK株式会社
- Romanized name: NGK kabushiki gaisha
- Formerly: NGK Insrators, Ltd. (1919-2026)
- Type: Public KK
- Traded as: TYO: 5333; NAG: 5333; Nikkei 225 component
- Industry: Glass and Ceramics
- Predecessor: Spun-off from Nippon Toki (now Noritake)
- Founded: May 5, 1919; 107 years ago
- Headquarters: Nagoya, Japan
- Key people: Shun Matsushita, President and CEO; Masaharu Shibata, Chairman
- Products: Insulator (electrical); Sodium-sulfur batteries (grid energy storage)
- Revenue: ▲¥119,976 million (2010)
- Operating income: ▲¥16,551 million (2010)
- Net income: ▲¥10,983 million (2010)
- Total assets: ¥313,591 million (2010)
- Number of employees: 3,272
- Parent: Morimura Group
- Website: www.ngk.co.jp/english/index.html

NGK Corporation (NGK株式会社) is a Japanese ceramics company. It primarily produces insulators but also produces other products, especially ceramic products. NGK is headquartered in Tokyo (Marunouchi Bldg. 25F, 2-4-1, Marunouchi, Chiyoda-ku, Tokyo 100–6325) and is listed on the Nikkei 225, which is an index of the Tokyo Stock Exchange. It is also listed in the Osaka Securities Exchange, the Nagoya Stock Exchange, and the Sapporo Securities Exchange all under listing code 5333. NGK stands for Nippon (Japan) Gaishi (insulator) Kaisha (company). The company was established in 1919 as a spin-off of the insulator manufacturing division of Nippon Toki (now Noritake) and was known as NGK Insulators, Ltd. (日本碍子株式会社, Nihon gaishi kabushikigaisha) from its founding until 2026.

== Sodium-sulfur batteries ==
NGK Insulators is known-worldwide for the development of sodium-sulfur batteries in cooperation with TEPCO. NGK's NaS battery systems are being used worldwide, primarily in Japan and the United States.

NGK Insulators markets its NaS batteries for use as grid storage (especially for use in conjunction with renewable energy sources such as wind and solar). The battery systems can be used for both peak shaving, load leveling, emissions reductions, and as emergency power supplies. The "typical system" (as defined by NGK) is composed of 40 50-kW units for a total system capacity of 12,000 kWh.

NGK's systems are currently used worldwide, both as grid storage and as a supplement to wind and solar installations. System capacities range from 1.5 to 34 MW.

== See also ==
- NGK
- Tokyo Electric Power Company
