= Molten-salt battery =

Type of battery that uses molten salts

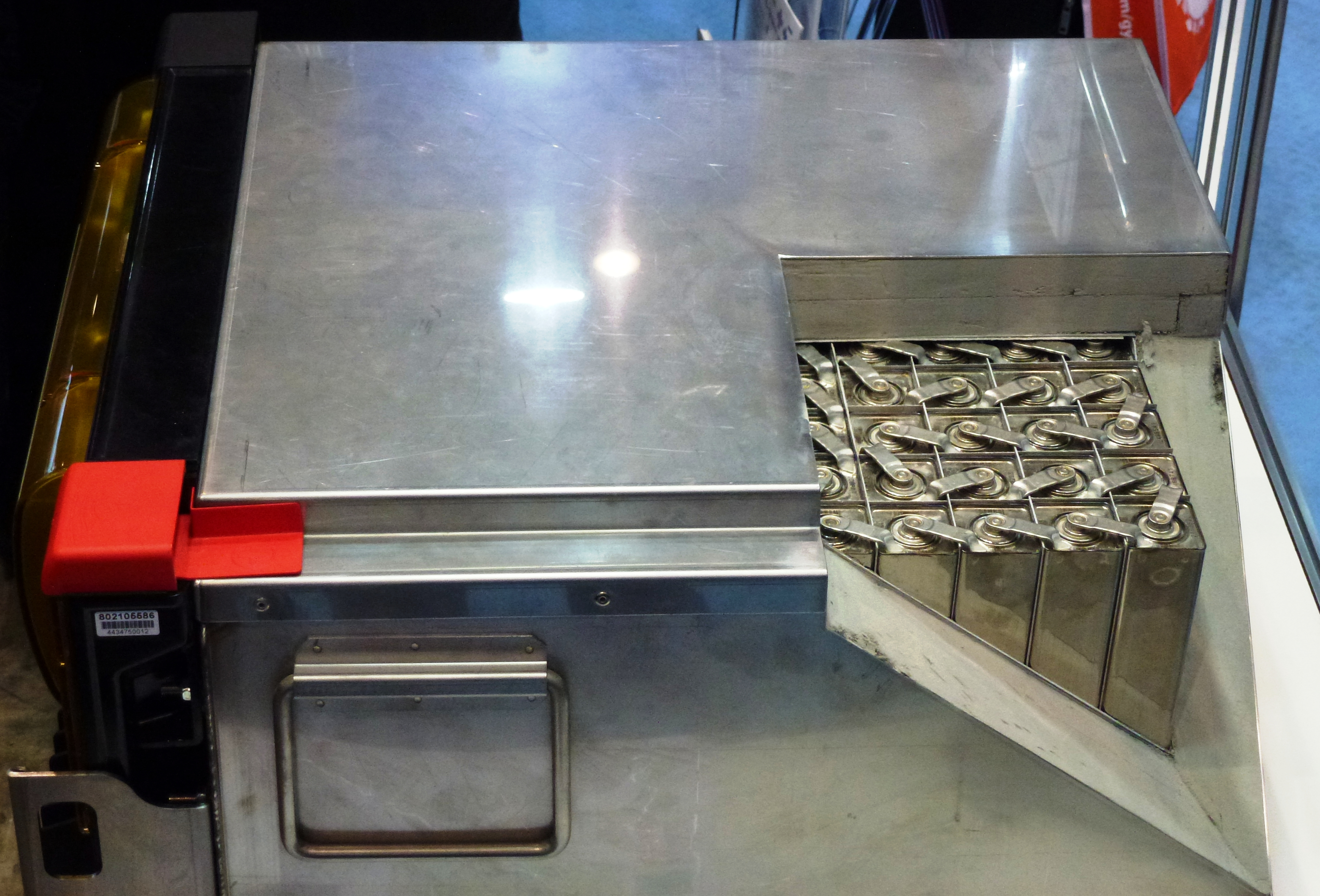
FZSoNick 48TL200: sodium–nickel battery with welding-sealed cells and heat insulation

Molten-salt batteries are a class of battery that uses molten salts as an electrolyte and offers both a high energy density and a high power density. Traditional non-rechargeable thermal batteries can be stored in their solid state at room temperature for long periods of time before being activated by heating. Rechargeable liquid-metal batteries are used for industrial power backup and grid energy storage to balance out intermittent renewable power sources such as solar panels and wind turbines.

In 2023, the use of molten salts as electrolytes for high-energy rechargeable lithium metal batteries was demonstrated.

== History ==
Thermal batteries originated during World War II when German scientist Georg Otto Erb developed the first practical cells using a salt mixture as an electrolyte. Erb developed batteries for military applications, including the V-1 flying bomb and the V-2 rocket, and artillery fuzing systems. None of these batteries entered field use during the war. Afterwards, Erb was interrogated by British intelligence. His work was reported in "The Theory and Practice of Thermal Cells". This information was subsequently passed on to the United States Ordnance Development Division of the National Bureau of Standards. When the technology reached the United States in 1946, it was immediately applied to replacing the troublesome liquid-based systems that had previously been used to power artillery proximity fuzes. They were used for ordnance applications (e.g., proximity fuzes) since WWII and later in nuclear weapons. The same technology was studied by Argonne National Laboratories and other researchers in the 1980s for use in electric vehicles.

== Rechargeable configurations ==
Since the mid-1960s much development work has been undertaken on rechargeable batteries using sodium (Na) for the negative electrodes. Sodium is attractive because of its high reduction potential of −2.71 volts, low weight, relative abundance, and low cost. In order to construct practical batteries, the sodium must be in liquid form. The melting point of sodium is 98 °C (208 °F). This means that sodium-based batteries operate at temperatures between 245 and 350 °C (470 and 660 °F). Research has investigated metal combinations with operating temperatures at 200 °C (390 °F) and room temperature.

=== Sodium–sulfur ===
The sodium–sulfur battery (NaS battery), along with the related lithium–sulfur battery employs cheap and abundant electrode materials. It was the first alkali-metal commercial battery. It used liquid sulfur for the positive electrode and a ceramic tube of beta-alumina solid electrolyte (BASE). Insulator corrosion was a problem because they gradually became conductive, and the self-discharge rate increased.

Because of their high specific power, NaS batteries have been proposed for space applications. An NaS battery for space use was successfully tested on the Space Shuttle mission STS-87 in 1997, but the batteries have not been used operationally in space. NaS batteries have been proposed for use in the high-temperature environment of Venus.

A consortium formed by Tokyo Electric Power Co. (TEPCO) and NGK Insulators Ltd. declared their interest in researching the NaS battery in 1983, and became the primary drivers behind the development of this type ever since. TEPCO chose the NaS battery because its component elements (sodium, sulfur and ceramics) are abundant in Japan. The first large-scale field testing took place at TEPCO's Tsunashima substation between 1993 and 1996, using 3 × 2 MW, 6.6 kV battery banks. Based on the findings from this trial, improved battery modules were developed and were made commercially available in 2000. The commercial NaS battery bank offers:

- Capacity : 25–250 kWh per bank
- Efficiency of 87%
- Lifetime of 2,500 cycles at 100% depth of discharge (DOD), or 4,500 cycles at 80% DOD

=== Sodium–nickel chloride (Zebra) battery ===
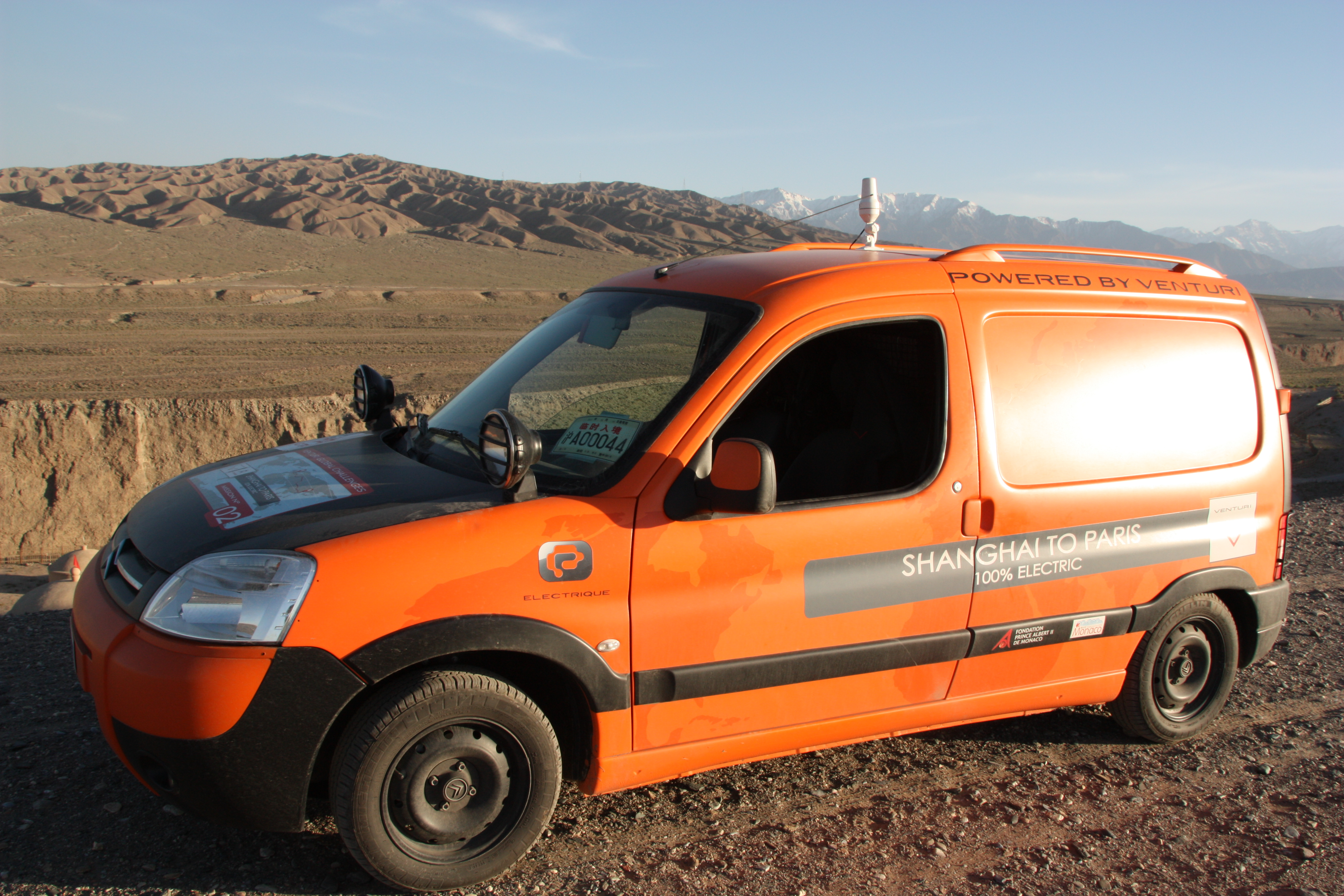
The Citroën Berlingo First Electric "Powered by Venturi" used a ZEBRA storage battery; a specially-prepared version was driven from Shanghai to Paris in 2010.

A lower-temperature variant of molten-salt batteries was the development of the ZEBRA (originally, "Zeolite Battery Research Africa"; later, the "Zero Emissions Batteries Research Activity") battery in 1985, originally developed for electric vehicle applications. The battery uses NaNiCl_{2} with Na^{+}-beta-alumina ceramic electrolyte.

The NaNiCl_{2} battery operates at 245 °C (473 °F) and uses molten sodium tetrachloroaluminate (NaAlCl_{4}), which has a melting point of 157 °C (315 °F), as the electrolyte. The negative electrode is molten sodium. The positive electrode is nickel in the discharged state and nickel chloride in the charged state. Because nickel and nickel chloride are nearly insoluble in neutral and basic melts, contact is allowed, providing little resistance to charge transfer. Since both NaAlCl_{4} and Na are liquid at the operating temperature, a sodium-conducting β-alumina ceramic is used to separate the liquid sodium from the molten NaAlCl_{4}. The primary elements used in the manufacture of these batteries have much higher worldwide reserves and annual production than lithium.

It was invented in 1985 by the Zeolite Battery Research Africa Project (ZEBRA) group at the Council for Scientific and Industrial Research (CSIR) in Pretoria, South Africa. It can be assembled in the discharged state, using NaCl, Al, nickel and iron powder. The positive electrode is composed mostly of materials in the solid state, which reduces the likelihood of corrosion, improving safety. Its specific energy is 100 Wh/kg; specific power is 150 W/kg. The β-alumina solid ceramic is unreactive to sodium metal and sodium aluminum chloride. Lifetimes of over 2,000 cycles and twenty years have been demonstrated with full-sized batteries, and over 4,500 cycles and fifteen years with 10- and 20-cell modules. For comparison, LiFePO_{4} lithium iron phosphate batteries store 90–110 Wh/kg, and the more common LiCoO_{2} lithium-ion batteries store 150–200 Wh/kg. A nano lithium-titanate battery stores 72 Wh/kg and can provide power of 760 W/kg.

The ZEBRA's liquid electrolyte freezes at 157 °C (315 °F), and the normal operating temperature range is 270–350 °C (520–660 °F). Adding iron to the cell increases its power response. ZEBRA batteries are currently manufactured by FZSoNick and used as a power backup in the telecommunication industries, Oil&Gas and Railways. It is also used in special electric vehicles used in mining. In the past it was adopted in the prototype Smart ED and the Th!nk City. In 2011 the US Postal Service began testing all-electric delivery vans, one powered by a ZEBRA battery.

In 2010 General Electric announced a Na-NiCl_{2} battery that it called a sodium–metal halide battery, with a 20-year lifetime. Its cathode structure consists of a conductive nickel network, molten salt electrolyte, metal current collector, carbon felt electrolyte reservoir and the active sodium–metal halide salts. In 2015, as a result of a global restructuring, the company abandoned the project. In 2017 Chinese battery maker Chilwee Group (also known as Chaowei) created a new company with General Electric (GE) to bring to market a Na-NiCl battery for industrial and energy storage applications.

When not in use, Na-NiCl_{2} batteries are typically kept molten and ready for use because if allowed to solidify they typically take twelve hours to reheat and charge.

Sodium metal chloride batteries are very safe; a thermal runaway can be activated only by piercing the battery and also, in this unlikely event, no fire or explosion will be generated. This characteristic, and the possibility for them to be installed outdoor without cooling systems, make sodium metal chloride batteries very suitable for industrial and commercial energy storage installations.

Sumitomo studied a battery using a salt that is molten at 61 °C (142 °F), far lower than sodium based batteries, and operational at 90 °C (194 °F). It offers energy densities as high as 290 Wh/L and 224 Wh/kg and charge/discharge rates of 1C with a lifetime of 100–1000 charge cycles. The battery employs only nonflammable materials and neither ignites on contact with air nor risks thermal runaway. This eliminates waste-heat storage or fire- and explosion-proof equipment, and allows closer cell packing. The company claimed that the battery required half the volume of lithium-ion batteries and one quarter that of sodium–sulfur batteries. The cell used a nickel cathode and a glassy carbon anode.

In 2014 researchers identified a liquid sodium–cesium alloy that operates at 50 °C (122 °F) and produced 420 milliampere-hours per gram. The new material was able to fully coat, or "wet," the electrolyte. After 100 charge/discharge cycles, a test battery maintained about 97% of its initial storage capacity. The lower operating temperature allowed the use of a less-expensive polymer external casing instead of steel, offsetting some of the increased cost of cesium.

Innovenergy in Meiringen, Switzerland has further optimised this technology with the use of domestically sourced raw materials, except for the nickel powder component. Despite the reduced capacity compared with lithium-ion batteries, the ZEBRA technology is applicable for stationary energy storage from solar power. In 2022, the company operated a 540 kWh storage facility for solar cells on the roof of a shopping center, and currently produces over a million battery units per year from sustainable, non-toxic materials (table salt).

=== Liquid-metal batteries ===
Professor Donald Sadoway at the Massachusetts Institute of Technology has published research on liquid-metal rechargeable batteries, using both magnesium–antimony and more recently lead–antimony. The electrode and electrolyte layers are heated until they are liquid and self-segregate due to density and immiscibility. Such batteries may have longer lifetimes than conventional batteries, as the electrodes go through a cycle of creation and destruction during the charge–discharge cycle, which makes them immune to the degradation that afflicts conventional battery electrodes.

The technology was proposed in 2009 based on magnesium and antimony separated by a molten salt. Magnesium was chosen as the negative electrode for its low cost and low solubility in the molten-salt electrolyte. Antimony was selected as the positive electrode due to its low cost and higher anticipated discharge voltage.

In 2011, the researchers demonstrated a cell with a lithium anode and a lead–antimony cathode, which had higher ionic conductivity and lower melting points (350–430 °C). The drawback of the Li chemistry is higher cost. A Li/LiF + LiCl + LiI/Pb-Sb cell with about 0.9 V open-circuit potential operating at 450 °C had electroactive material costs of US$100/kWh and US$100/kW and a projected 25-year lifetime. Its discharge power at 1.1 A/cm^{2} is only 44% (and 88% at 0.14 A/cm^{2}).

Experimental data shows 69% storage efficiency, with good storage capacity (over 1000 mAh/cm^{2}), low leakage (< 1 mA/cm^{2}) and high maximal discharge capacity (over 200 mA/cm^{2}). By October 2014 the MIT team achieved an operational efficiency of approximately 70% at high charge/discharge rates (275 mA/cm^{2}), similar to that of pumped-storage hydroelectricity and higher efficiencies at lower currents. Tests showed that after 10 years of regular use, the system would retain about 85% of its initial capacity. In September 2014, a study described an arrangement using a molten alloy of lead and antimony for the positive electrode, liquid lithium for the negative electrode; and a molten mixture of lithium salts as the electrolyte.

A recent innovation is the PbBi alloy which enables lower melting point lithium-based battery. It uses a molten salt electrolyte based on LiCl-LiI and operates at 410 °C.

Ionic liquids have been shown to have prowess for use in rechargeable batteries. The electrolyte is pure molten salt with no added solvent, which is accomplished by using a salt having a room temperature liquid phase. This causes a highly viscous solution, and is typically made with structurally large salts with malleable lattice structures.

== Thermal batteries (non-rechargeable) ==
=== Technologies ===
Thermal batteries use an electrolyte that is solid and inactive at ambient temperatures. They can be stored indefinitely (over 50 years) yet provide full power in an instant when required. Once activated, they provide a burst of high power for a short period (a few tens of seconds to 60 minutes or more), with output ranging from watts to kilowatts. The high power is due to the high ionic conductivity of the molten salt (resulting in a low internal resistance), which is three orders of magnitude (or more) greater than that of the sulfuric acid in a lead–acid car battery.

One design uses a fuze strip (containing barium chromate and powdered zirconium metal in a ceramic paper) along the edge of the heat pellets to initiate the electrochemical reaction. The fuze strip is typically fired by an electrical igniter or squib which is activated with an electric current.

Another design uses a central hole in the middle of the battery stack, into which the high-energy electrical igniter fires a mixture of hot gases and incandescent particles. This allows much shorter activation times (tens of milliseconds) vs. hundreds of milliseconds for the edge-strip design. Battery activation can be accomplished by a percussion primer, similar to a shotgun shell. The heat source should be gasless. The standard heat source typically consists of mixtures of iron powder and potassium perchlorate in weight ratios of 88/12, 86/14, or 84/16. The higher the potassium perchlorate level, the higher the heat output (nominally 200, 259, and 297 cal/g respectively). This property of unactivated storage has the double benefit of avoiding deterioration of the active materials during storage and eliminating capacity loss due to self-discharge until the battery is activated.

In the 1980s lithium-alloy anodes replaced calcium or magnesium anodes, with cathodes of calcium chromate, vanadium or tungsten oxides. Lithium–silicon alloys are favored over the earlier lithium–aluminium alloys. The corresponding cathode for use with the lithium-alloy anodes is mainly iron disulfide (pyrite) replaced by cobalt disulfide for high-power applications. The electrolyte is normally a eutectic mixture of lithium chloride and potassium chloride.

More recently, other lower-melting, eutectic electrolytes based on lithium bromide, potassium bromide, and lithium chloride or lithium fluoride have also been used to provide longer operational lifetimes; they are also better conductors. The so-called "all-lithium" electrolyte based on lithium chloride, lithium bromide, and lithium fluoride (no potassium salts) is also used for high-power applications, because of its high ionic conductivity. A radioisotope thermal generator, such as in the form of pellets of ^{90}SrTiO_{4}, can be used for long-term delivery of heat for the battery after activation, keeping it in a molten state.

=== Uses ===
Thermal batteries are used almost exclusively for military applications, notably for nuclear weapons and guided missiles. They are the primary power source for many missiles such as the AIM-9 Sidewinder, AIM-54 Phoenix, MIM-104 Patriot, BGM-71 TOW, BGM-109 Tomahawk and others. In these batteries the electrolyte is immobilized when molten by a special grade of magnesium oxide that holds it in place by capillary action. This powdered mixture is pressed into pellets to form a separator between the anode and cathode of each cell in the battery stack. As long as the electrolyte (salt) is solid, the battery is inert and remains inactive. Each cell also contains a pyrotechnic heat source, which is used to heat the cell to the typical operating temperature of 400–550 °C.

== See also ==
- Carnot battery
- Flow battery
- List of battery types
- Primary cell
- Secondary cell
- Smart grid
