= Little Barford Power Station =

Power station in Bedfordshire, England

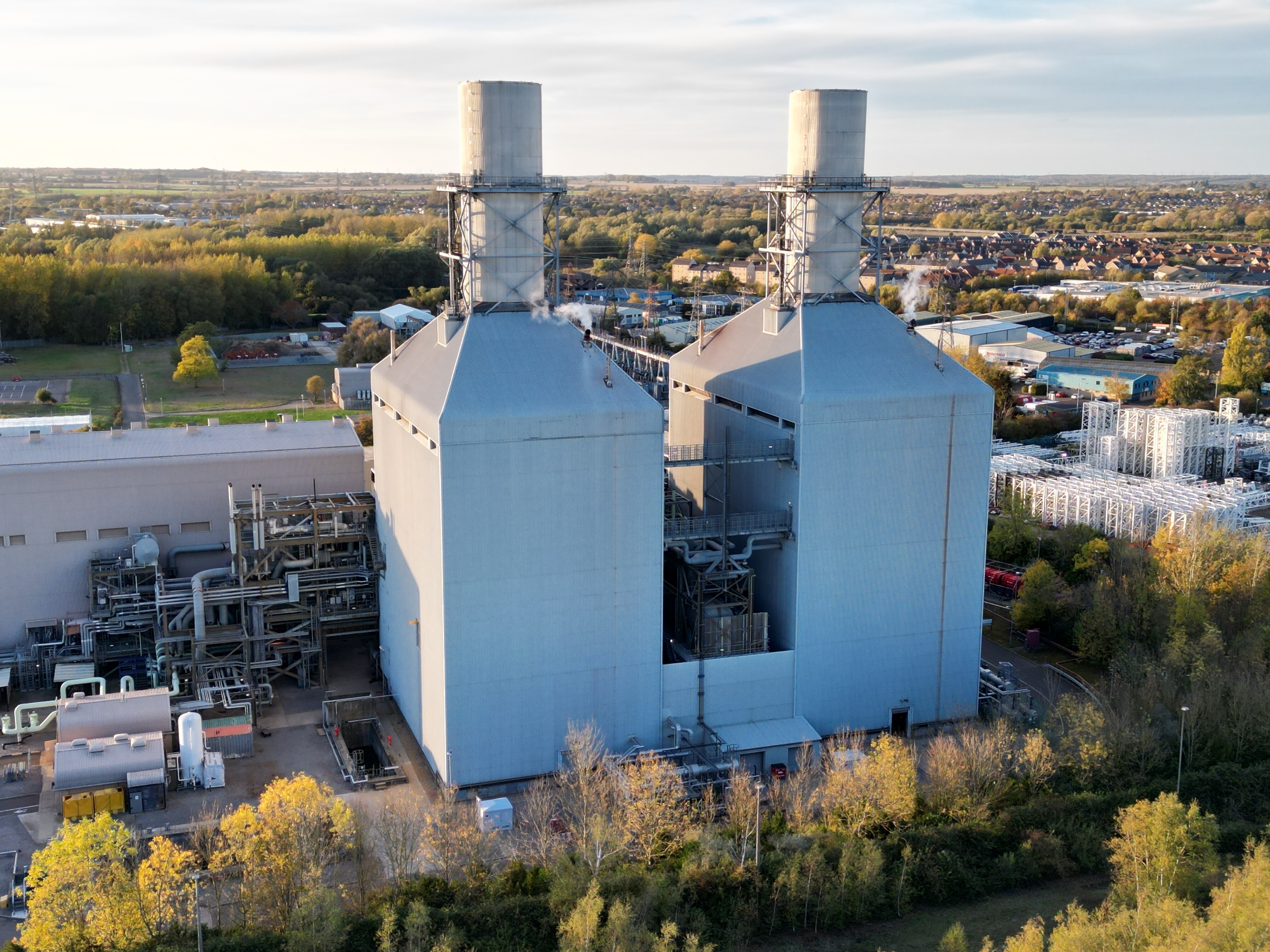
- Little Barford power station in 2023
- Official name: Little Barford power station
- Country: England
- Location: Bedfordshire
- Coordinates: 52°12′16″N 0°16′8″W
- Status: A & B decommissioned and demolished, C: operational
- Commission date: A: 1941, B: 1959, CCGT: 1994
- Decommission date: A: 1981 B: 1984
- Owners: British Electricity Authority (1948–1955); Central Electricity Authority (1955–1957); Central Electricity Generating Board (1958–1990)
- Operator: RWE Generation UK

Thermal power station
- Primary fuel: A & B Coal, CCGT Natural gas
- Tertiary fuel: Fuel oil
- Chimneys: A & B 3
- Cooling towers: A & B 2. CCGT 2 rows
- Cooling source: A & B river water + cooling towers, river water + hybrid cooling towers
- Combined cycle?: Yes

Power generation
- Units operational: CCGT 2 total 727 MW
- Make and model: General Electric Frame 9F gas turbines
- Units decommissioned: A & B all decommissioned
- Nameplate capacity: CCGT 727 MWe
- Annual net output: A & B see graphs in text

External links
- Commons: Related media on Commons

Little Barford Power Station is a combined cycle gas turbine power station in the parish of Little Barford in Bedfordshire, England. It lies just south of the A428 St Neots bypass and east of the Wyboston Leisure Park. The River Great Ouse runs alongside. It was formerly the site of two coal-fired power stations, now demolished. The station is operated by RWE.

The net capacity of 727 MW is sufficient to supply over half a million households.

== History ==
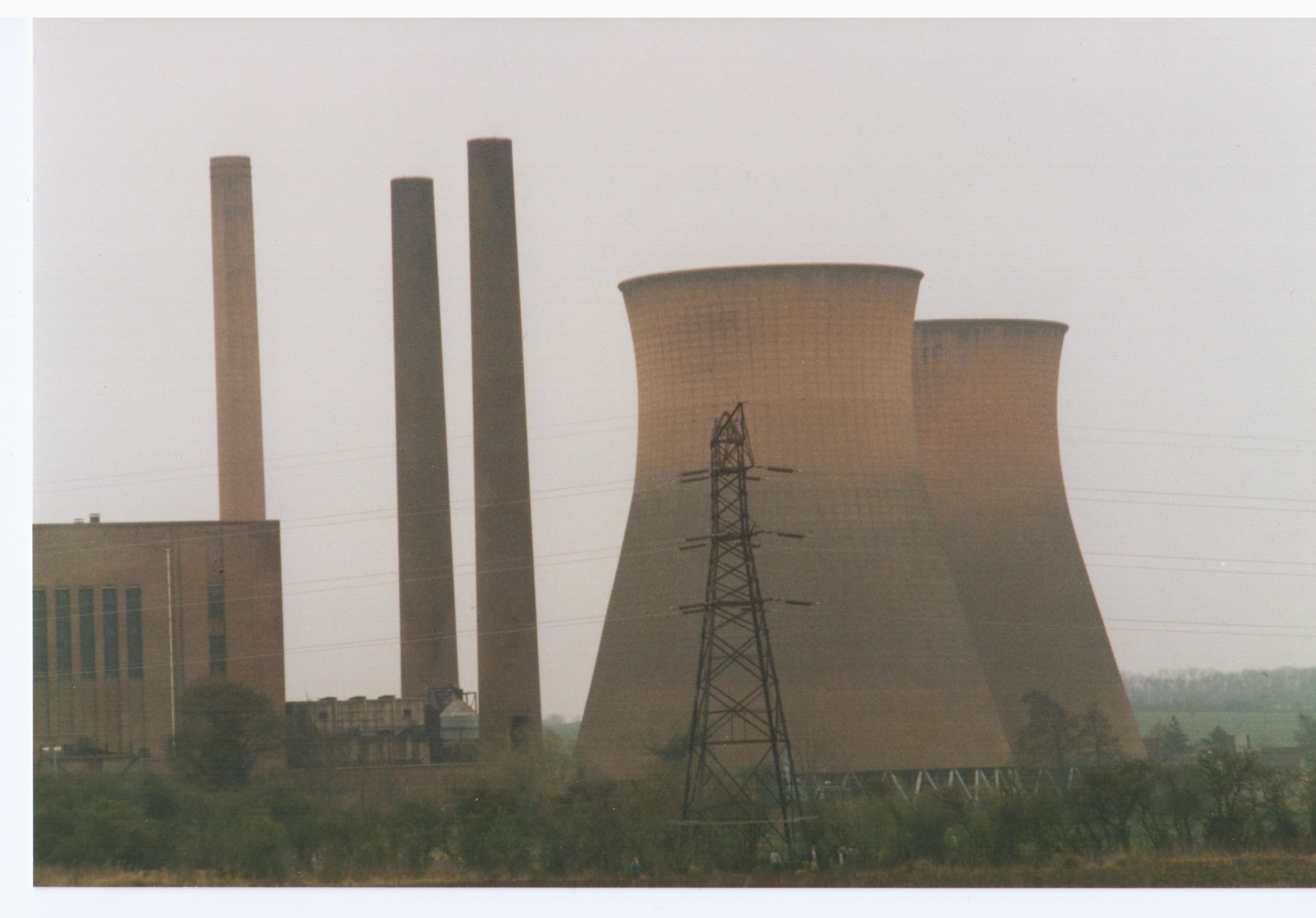
Little Barford coal-fired power station before its demolition in 1989

Little Barford combined cycle gas turbine (CCGT) power station was built on the site of two former coal-fired power stations opened in 1939 and 1959 that had a generating capacity of 126 and 127 MW.

=== Little Barford A ===
Little Barford A station was built and operated by the Bedfordshire, Cambridgeshire and Huntingdonshire Electricity Company. It was authorised in June 1938 and commissioned in 1941. It had an installed capacity of 126 MW and comprised four 31.5 MW English Electric generators. The boilers — two International Combustion and two Stirling — burned pulverised coal and produced steam at a rate of 1,200,000 lb/hr (151.2 kg/s) at a pressure of 650 psi (45 bar) and 482 °C (900 °F). The station was adjacent to the East Coast Main Line railway, coal was delivered and ash was removed via sidings and a connection with the railway (at 49 miles & 69 chains from London Kings Cross). The siding was extant in 2008 but had been removed by 2016. In 1961, the oldest generating set was 20 years old (commissioned in 1941) and the thermal efficiency of the station was 22.63 per cent. Water for condensing was abstracted from the River Ouse and was supplemented with a cooling tower with a capacity of 2,500,000 imperial gallons (11,000 cubic metres) per hour.

Output in GWh over the period 1946–1982

The A station was closed on 26 October 1981.

=== Little Barford B ===
Little Barford B station was a 120 MW station constructed by the Central Electricity Generating Board (CEGB). It contained two x 60 MW C. A. Parsons turbo alternators. Each set was supplied from a Foster Wheeler boiler burning pulverised coal and produced steam at a rate of 550,000 lb/hr (138.6 kg/s) at a pressure of 900 psi (62 bar) and 482 °C (900 °F). Cooling was by an additional cooling towers. Unit 1 was commissioned in March 1959 followed by unit 2 in October 1959. In 1961 the thermal efficiency of the station was 28.96 per cent. The station had completely remote operation of the two 60 MW units. The automatic electronic boiler control system used online computers and process controllers, the first in the UK.

Output in GWh over the period 1961–84

Demolition of both stations took place in 1989, an event covered by the children's TV programme Blue Peter. Two 60 metres (197 ft) and one 75 metres (246 ft) tall chimneys and two 55 metres (180 ft) high cooling towers were blown up.

The two Parsons turbo-alternators of the B station were shipped to Malta. One was recommissioned as Unit 8 at Marsa Power Station and remained in service until 15 February 2015.

=== Little Barford CCGT ===
Construction of the gas-fired station started in 1994, and it opened in 1996. The company that built it, Swindon-based National Power, became Innogy in August 2000. That company was bought by the German electricity company, Essen-based RWE in March 2002, and became RWE npower. The station is now owned and operated by RWE Generation UK.

In 2002, a 12 MWe electrical storage facility was built by Regenesys Technologies (previously owned by Innogy but bought by VRB Power Systems in October 2004) which uses polysulfide bromide flow batteries. However, the facility was never operated commercially due to engineering issues in scaling up the technology.

In 2019, the failure of the plant was partially responsible for a large scale nationwide power cut on the evening of 9 August, after lightning hit a transmission line.

The station was constructed as a turn-key project awarded to GEC Alsthom, with principal equipment supplied by various GEC Alstom divisions including the gas turbine, LP steam turbine, steam boilers, electrical generator and transformers. Civil engineering and building was sub-contracted to Henry Boot. The station underwent an upgrade in 2012.

== Original specification ==
The site is a combined cycle gas turbine (CCGT) power station using natural gas. It originally had two General Electric Frame 9F gas turbine engines each producing 220 MWe. Each of these had a Stein Industry heat recovery steam generator which lead to one steam turbine produced by Alstom which produced 256 MWe.

== Upgraded specification ==
In 2012, the plant was upgraded to General Electric Frame 9FA+e gas turbine engines each producing 241 MWe. They are still connected to the original heat recovery steam generator which led to the steam turbine produced by Alstom which now produces 265 MWe.
