= Dispersion =

Dispersion may refer to:

== Economics and finance ==
- Dispersion (finance), a measure for the statistical distribution of portfolio returns
- Price dispersion, a variation in prices across sellers of the same item
- Wage dispersion, the amount of variation in wages encountered in an economy
- Dispersed knowledge, notion that any one person is unable to perceive all economic forces

== Science and mathematics ==
=== Mathematics ===
- Statistical dispersion, a quantifiable variation of measurements of differing members of a population
  - Index of dispersion, a normalized measure of the dispersion of a probability distribution
- Dispersion point, a point in a topological space the removal of which leaves the space highly disconnected

=== Physics ===
- The dependence of wave velocity on frequency or wavelength:
  - Dispersion (optics), for light waves
  - Dispersion (water waves), for water waves
  - Acoustic dispersion, for sound waves
  - Dispersion relation, the mathematical description of dispersion in a system
  - Modal dispersion, spreading of signals in multimode fibers and waveguides by a distortion mechanism
    - Polarization mode dispersion, a form of modal dispersion
  - Dielectric dispersion, the dependence of the permittivity of a dielectric material on the frequency of an applied electric field
  - Dispersion measure, the dispersion of radio signals from pulsars and fast radio bursts
- Dispersive mass transfer, in fluid dynamics, the spreading of mass from areas of high to low concentration
  - Atmospheric dispersion modeling, mathematical simulation of how air pollutants disperse in the ambient atmosphere
- London dispersion force, an instantaneous induced dipole-induced dipole
- Dispersed particle resistance, a measured parameter to characterize battery active materials

=== Other sciences ===
- Biological dispersal, the distribution of animals, spores, fruits and their seeds, etc.
- Dispersion (chemistry), a system in which particles are dispersed in a continuous phase of a different composition
- Dispersion (geology), a process whereby sodic soil disperses when exposed to water
- Dispersion (materials science), the fraction of atoms of a material exposed to the surface
- Dispersion polymerization, a polymerization process
- Velocity dispersion, the statistical variation of velocities about the mean velocity for a group of astronomical objects

== Other uses ==
- Hellenistic Judaism § Hellenism, Jewish communities who lived amongst the gentiles in the first century CE
- Dispersion (album), the second album by High Rise
- Dispersion Technology, a scientific instrument manufacturer located in Bedford Hills, New York

== See also ==
- Dispersal (disambiguation)
- Dispersive (disambiguation)
- Dispersity, a measure of the heterogeneity of sizes of molecules or particles in a mixture
