= Semi-solid flow battery =

A semi-solid flow battery is a type of flow battery using solid battery active materials or involving solid species in the energy carrying fluid. A research team in MIT proposed this concept using lithium-ion battery materials. In such a system, both positive (cathode) and negative electrode (anode) consist of active material particles with carbon black suspended in liquid electrolyte. Active material suspensions are stored in two energy storage tanks. The suspensions are pumped into the electrochemical reaction cell when charging and discharging. This design takes advantage of both the designing flexibility of flow batteries and the high energy density active materials of lithium-ion batteries.

== Flow Mode and Chemistries ==
Two different flow modes were explored, intermittent flow mode and continuous flow mode. In an intermittent flow mode, suspensions are pumped into the electrochemical reaction cell in a batch basis and a new batch is pumped in only after the previous batch has been fully charged/discharged. In a continuous flow mode, however, the suspensions are continuously pumped through the electrochemical reaction cell during the charge/discharge process. By using lithium-ion battery active materials, the energy density of the flow battery system can be significantly improved. An aqueous system was also demonstrated besides the organic one. Other chemistries have also been explored for this system, such as sodium-ion battery, lithium–sulfur battery, and others.

== System Developments ==
=== Solid Dispersion Flow Battery ===
Despite the significant advantage of such a system, one key limitation was the high viscosity, which makes the power consumption for pumping very high, hence decreasing the energy efficiency. Another research team in University of Virginia reported a carbon-free flow battery system. In this new system, also called Solid Dispersion Flow Battery, a new reaction mechanism was discovered with electrochemical reactions occurring based on particle collisions.

=== Redox Targeting Flow Battery ===
Another approach is to pump the liquid phase only, leaving the solid active materials in the energy storage tanks. A research group reported redox targeting flow battery. There are redox targeting materials dissolved in the electrolyte and electrochemical reactions occur between the dissolved species. The solid materials are then been chemically oxidized or reduced. By keeping solid materials in the tanks, only the liquid electrolyte is being pumped. This saves the pumping energy although the voltage efficiency is sacrificed.
