= Gelion =

Gelion may refer to:

- Gelion (Middle-Earth): a fictional river in Tolkien's legendarium
- Gelion (company): A research and development company that produces lithium-sulfur and sodium-sulfur batteries.
