= Zinc–cerium battery =

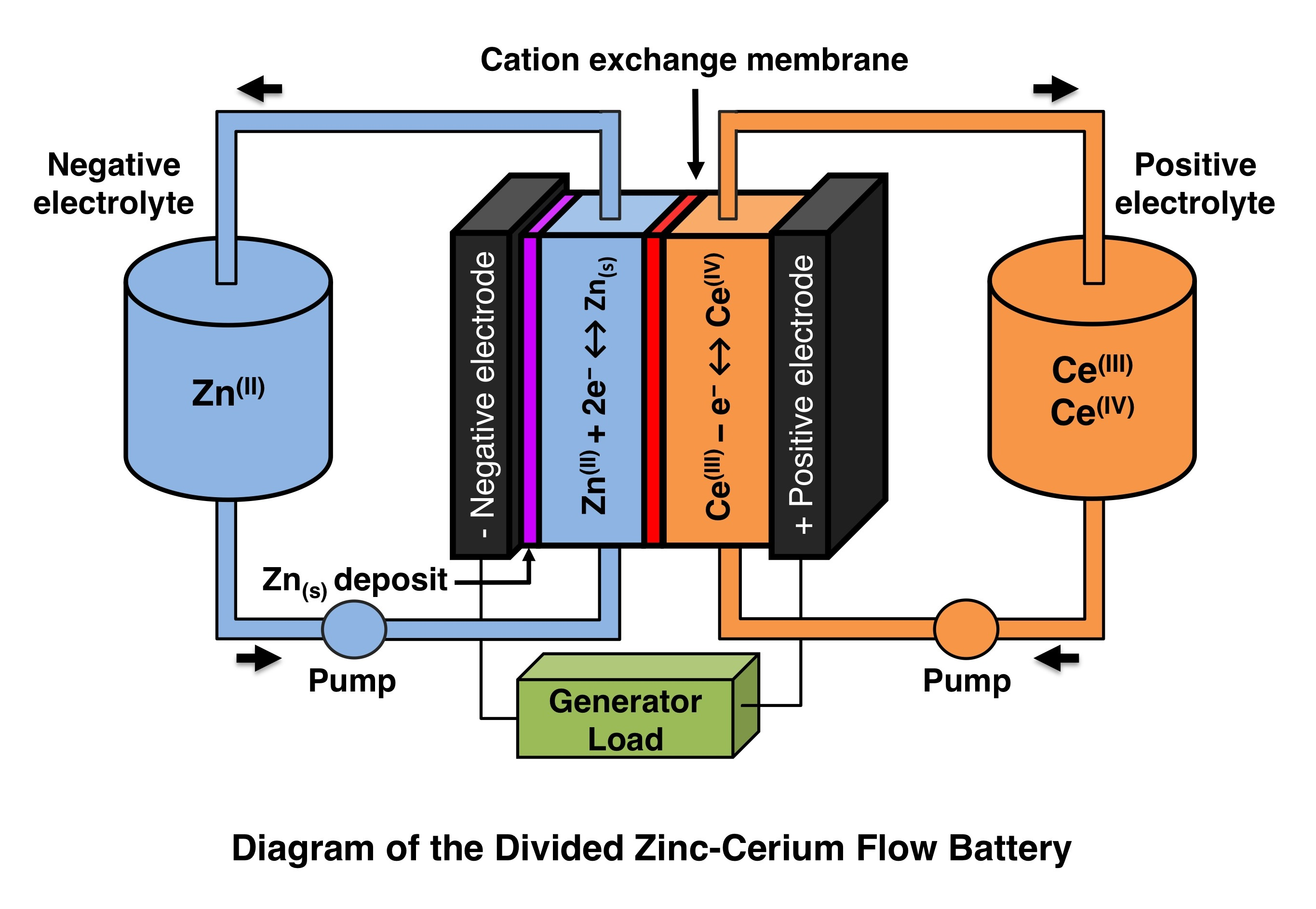
Diagram of the divided zinc–cerium redox flow battery

Zinc–cerium batteries are a type of redox flow battery first developed by Plurion Inc. (UK) during the 2000s. In this rechargeable battery, both negative zinc and positive cerium electrolytes are circulated though an electrochemical flow reactor during the operation and stored in two separated reservoirs. Negative and positive electrolyte compartments in the electrochemical reactor are separated by a cation-exchange membrane, usually Nafion (DuPont). The Ce(III)/Ce(IV) and Zn(II)/Zn redox reactions take place at the positive and negative electrodes, respectively. Since zinc is electroplated during charge at the negative electrode this system is classified as a hybrid flow battery. Unlike in zinc–bromine and zinc–chlorine redox flow batteries, no condensation device is needed to dissolve halogen gases. The reagents used in the zinc-cerium system are considerably less expensive than those used in the vanadium flow battery.

Due to the high standard electrode potentials of both zinc and cerium redox reactions in aqueous media, the open-circuit cell voltage is as high as 2.43 V. Among the other proposed rechargeable aqueous flow battery systems, this system has the largest cell voltage and its power density per electrode area is second only to H2-Br2 flow battery. Methanesulfonic acid is used as supporting electrolyte, as it allows high concentrations of both zinc and cerium; the solubility of the corresponding methanesulfonates is 2.1 M for Zn, 2.4 M for Ce(III) and up to 1.0 M for Ce(IV). Methanesulfonic acid is particularly well suited for industrial electrochemical applications and is considered to be a green alternative to other support electrolytes.

The Zn-Ce flow battery is still in early stages of development. The main technological challenge is the control of the inefficiency and self discharge (Zn corrosion via hydrogen evolution) at the negative electrode. In commercial terms, the need for expensive Pt-Ti electrodes increases the capital cost of the system in comparison to other RFBs.

== Cell chemistry ==
At the negative electrode (anode), zinc is electroplated and stripped on the carbon polymer electrodes during charge and discharge, respectively.

Zn^{2+}_{(aq)} + 2e^{−} ⇌ Zn_{(s)}

(−0.76 V vs. SHE)

At the positive electrode (cathode) (titanium based materials or carbon felt electrode), Ce(III) oxidation and Ce(IV) reduction take place during charge and discharge, respectively.

Ce^{4+}_{(aq)} + e^{−} ⇌ Ce^{3+}_{(aq)}

(ca. +1.44 V vs. SHE)

Because of the large cell voltage, hydrogen (0 V vs. SHE) and oxygen (+1.23 V vs. SHE) could evolve theoretically as side reactions during battery operation (especially on charging). The positive electrolyte is a solution of cerium(III) methanesulfonate.

== History and development ==
The zinc–cerium redox flow battery was first proposed by Clarke and co-workers in 2004, which has been the core technology of Plurion Inc. (UK). In 2008, Plurion Inc. suffered a liquidity crisis and was under liquidation in 2010 and the company was formally dissolved in 2012. However, the information of the experimental conditions and charge-discharge performance described in the early patents of Plurion Inc. are limited. Since the 2010s, the electrochemical properties and the characterisation of a zinc–cerium redox flow battery have been identified by the researchers of Southampton and Strathclyde Universities. During charge/discharge cycles at 50 mA cm^{−2}, the coulombic and voltage efficiencies of the zinc–cerium redox flow battery were reported to be 92 and 68%, respectively. In 2011, a membraneless (undivided) zinc–cerium system based on low acid concentration electrolyte using compressed pieces of carbon felt positive electrode was proposed. Discharge cell voltage and energy efficiency were reported to be approximately 2.1 V and 75%, respectively. With such undivided configuration (single electrolyte compartment), self-discharge was relatively slow at low concentrations of cerium and acid. Major installation of the zinc–cerium redox flow battery was the > 2 kW testing facility in Glenrothes, Scotland, installed by Plurion Inc. The use of mixed acid electrolytes for the positive half-cell has been investigated as a mean to increase the kinetics of the cerium redox reaction in State Key Laboratory of Rare Earth Resource Utilization and the Jiangxi University of Science and Technology, China. Platinum-iridium coatings have shown the best performance as positive electrodes for the battery, while being less expensive than platinum electrodes. Charge-discharge of the system has been preliminarily simulated. Research on mixed acids continues and it has been shown that low concentrations of hydrochloric acid can improve the electrochemical response of the cerium reaction, while nitric acid additions had negative results. Hierarchical porous carbon as the positive electrode has yielded better performance than carbon felt in laboratory scale experiments. The zinc electrodeposition on the negative electrode has been studied using a Hull cell. Carbon paper has also been studied as an alternative material for the positive electrode. Graphene oxide-graphite composites have shown some promise as a better catalytic electrode material for the reaction of cerium in the positive electrolyte. A similar cerium-lead RFB has been proposed. Indium-modified electrodes have been suggested as an alternative to conventional graphitised carbon as negative electrodes. The Zn-Ce system has introduced the use of this acid to other flow batteries as a better alternative to sulphuric acid. The relationship between cell potential and current density has been estimated for a Zn-Ce unit flow cell. This permitted to rationalise the contribution of the thermodynamic, kinetic and ohmic components of the battery voltage and to assess the effect of increasing inter-electrode gap.

The development of the Zn-Ce battery has been reviewed, as well as the electrochemical technology of cerium conversion for industrial applications, which include energy storage, nuclear decontamination, indirect organic synthesis, destruction of hazardous organics and gas scrubbing.

== See also ==
- Energy storage
- Load balancing
- Flow battery
- Rechargeable battery
- Battery (electricity)
- Electrochemical cell
- List of battery types
