= Polysulfide–bromide battery =

Flow battery

The polysulfide–bromine battery (PSB; sometimes polysulphide–polybromide or "bromine–sulfur") is a type of rechargeable electric battery that stores electrical energy in liquids, such as water-based solutions of two salts: sodium bromide and sodium polysulfide. It is a type of redox (reduction–oxidation) flow battery.

In 2002, a 12 MWe prototype electrical storage facility was built at Little Barford Power Station in the UK, which used polysulfide–bromide flow batteries. Although the facility was completed, due to engineering issues in scaling up the technology, it was never fully commissioned. A similar demonstration plant located at the Tennessee Valley Authority (TVA) facility in Columbus, Mississippi, United States, was never completed.

== Chemistry ==
Two different salt solution electrolytes are contained in two separate tanks. When energy is required, a solution of Na_{2}S_{2} (sodium disulfide) is pumped to the anode, and NaBr_{3} (sodium tribromide) is pumped to the cathode. The anode and cathode, along with their corresponding salt solutions, are separated by an ion exchange membrane.

At the negative electrode, the anodic reaction is:

$$2\ \mathrm{Na_2S_2} \rightarrow \mathrm{Na_2S_4} + 2\ \mathrm{Na^+} + 2\ \mathrm{e}^-$$

At the positive electrode, the cathodic reaction is:

$$\mathrm{NaBr_3} + 2\ \mathrm{Na^+} + 2\ \mathrm{e}^- \rightarrow 3\ \mathrm{NaBr}$$

As energy is drawn from the system, the sodium disulfide becomes sodium polysulfide, and the sodium tribromide becomes sodium bromide. This reaction can be reversed when a current is supplied to the electrodes, and the system's chemical salts are recharged. The system is sometimes defined as a fuel cell because the electrodes are not consumed by the reaction; they act only as a surface for the reaction. However, the liquid is not a fuel that is consumed—it is a salt solution electrolyte that is changed by the process.

== History ==
Although the possibilities of using polysulfide and bromine redox couples in flow and static batteries had been mentioned before, it was Robert Remick and Peter Ang of the Institute of Gas Technology (Chicago), who were the first to demonstrate (and claim in a patent) a rechargeable polysulfide–polybromide battery (SBB) in 1981. They secured a DOE grant for detailed studies that revealed MoS_{2} as a preferred (yet less than ideal) electrocatalyst for the negative electrode reaction.

In 1987, Stuart Licht, while at the Weizmann Institute of Science (Rehovot, Israel) and MIT (Cambridge, Massachusetts), demonstrated extraordinary aqueous solubility of potassium sulfides—for example, a 3:1 water:salt molar ratio for K_{2}S and K_{2}S_{4} solutions—and later demonstrated this with a sulfur/polysulfide–aluminum battery. Nevertheless, sodium chemistry remained the mainstream among polysulfide–polybromide RFB developers, perhaps because of the higher solubility of NaBr (8.82 molal at 20 °C) compared to KBr (5.49 molal at 20 °C).

In 1992, National Power PLC (formed in 1990 as a result of the privatization of the UK's electricity market) acquired from the Institute of Gas Technology the original US patent by Remick and Ang, and started a research and development program in the field of polysulfide–polybromide RFBs. Initial work at National Power was done by Ralph Zito, who was famously known for his prior work on Zn–Br_{2} RFBs. During the reorganization of the UK electricity market in the 1990s, the National Power patents were transferred to Innogy Technology Ventures Ltd, which became in 2002 a subsidiary of the German multi-utility RWE group of companies. Regenesys Technologies Limited was spun off from RWE-Innogy with the task of expedient demonstration and commercialization of polysulfide–polybromide RFBs, which were branded as Regenesys® batteries. By 2001, Regenesys employed over 70 people and demonstrated 5 kW and 10 kW stacks.

In 2001, the UK's Department of Trade and Industry funded approximately 50% of the total £2 million cost (with an expected cost-share from RWE-Innogy) of building a 100 kW Regenesys® battery at Little Barford in central England next to an existing gas-peaker plant and a proposed windmill site. A similar plant was considered in Columbus, Mississippi, USA, as part of the Tennessee Valley Authority's initiatives. However, scaling from 10 kW to 100 kW stacks proved more difficult than expected. After addressing several technical challenges, RWE decided to abandon the Regenesys® technology in 2003. The cost of developing the polysulfide–polybromide RFBs between 1990 and 2004 amounted to over £140 million.

Others also explored the feasibility of polysulfide–polybromide batteries. Around 2002, the Dalian Institute of Chemical Physics (China) launched its own SBB program. In 2004–2006, they reported 1 kW systems operating at 40 mA/cm^{2} with the cycle energy efficiency improving from 67% to 82% due mostly to the development of new electrode materials. Nevertheless, the commercialization of SBBs has been limited due to technical challenges such as sulfur deposition in the porous negative electrode during long-term cycling and the success of vanadium redox flow batteries.

In recent years, SBBs with Li^{+}- and Na^{+}-conducting ceramic separators have been demonstrated. Although these cells showed good cycle life over 100 cycles without noticeable degradation, they were operated at low current densities due to the high ohmic resistance of the separator.

== See also ==
- List of battery types
- Flow battery
- Battery (electricity)
- Lead–acid battery
- Electrochemical cell
- Electrochemical engineering
- Fuel cell
- Energy storage
