= Sodium polysulfide =

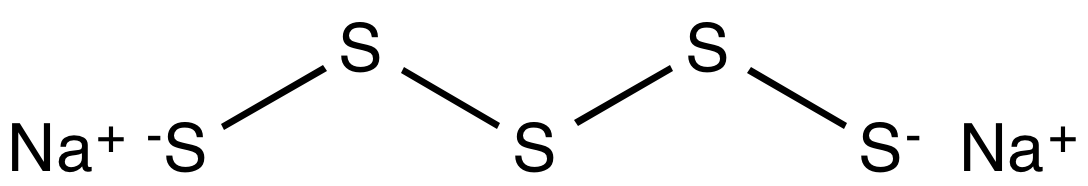
- Sodium pentasulfide Na_{2}S_{5}, a representative component of sodium polysulfide

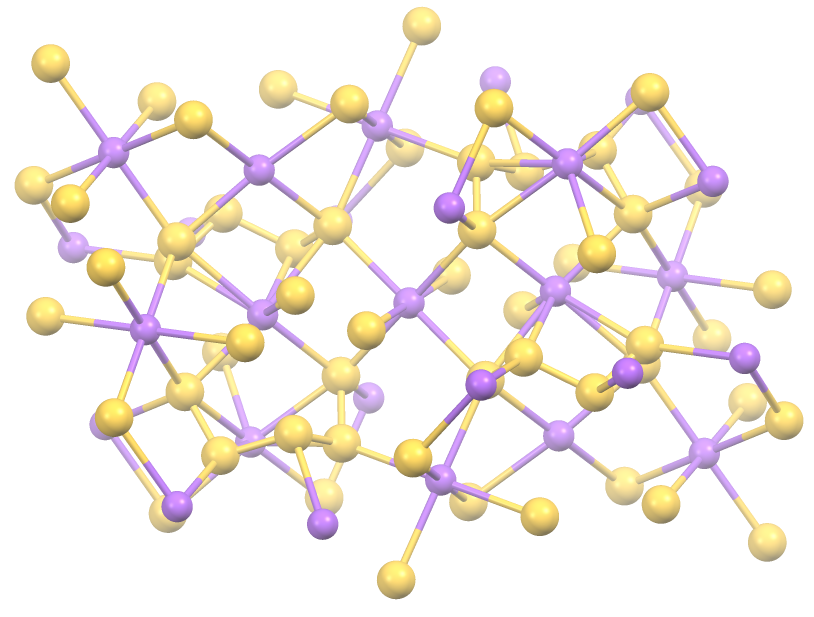
- Crystal structure of Na_{2}S_{5}. Purple: Na, yellow: S

Names
- Other names Sodium sulfane; Viradon

Identifiers
CAS Number	1344-08-7; tetrasulfide: 12034-39-8
3D model (JSmol)	tetrasulfide: Interactive image; pentasulfide: Interactive image
ChemSpider	tetrasulfide: 74748; pentasulfide: 23620743
ECHA InfoCard	100.014.261
EC Number	215-686-9; tetrasulfide: 234-805-5
PubChem CID	tetrasulfide: 82835; pentasulfide: 129677176
UNII	11J35Y83VX
UN number	UN3266
CompTox Dashboard (EPA)	DTXSID9051296
- InChI: tetrasulfide: InChI=1S/2Na.H2S4/c;;1-3-4-2/h;;1-2H/q2*+1;/p-2 Key: ZLCCLBKPLLUIJC-UHFFFAOYSA-L; pentasulfide: InChI=1S/2Na.H2S5/c;;1-3-5-4-2/h;;1-2H/q2*+1;/p-2 Key: WMEKSYHDIDMJMC-UHFFFAOYSA-L
- SMILES: tetrasulfide: [Na+].[Na+].[S-]SS[S-]; pentasulfide: [Na+].[Na+].[S-]SSS[S-]

Properties
Chemical formula	Na_{2}S_{x}, where x is 2 to 5
Appearance	Dark red crystalline solids

Hazards
- GHS labelling
Pictograms	(GHS02: Flammable) (GHS05: Corrosive) (GHS06: Toxic) (GHS09: Environmental hazard)
Signal word	Danger
Hazard statements	H228, H301, H311, H314, H400
Precautionary statements	P210, P240, P241, P260, P264, P270, P273, P280, P301+P310, P301+P330+P331, P302+P352, P303+P361+P353, P304+P340, P305+P351+P338, P310, P312, P321, P322, P330, P361, P363, P370+P378, P391, P405, P501
NFPA 704 (fire diamond)	3 0 1
Flash point	Non-combustible
Safety data sheet (SDS)	AGFA
- Except where otherwise noted, data are given for materials in their standard state (at 25 °C [77 °F], 100 kPa). Infobox references

Sodium polysulfide is a general term for salts with the formula Na_{2}S_{x}, where x = 2 to 5. The species S^{2−}_{x}, called polysulfide anions, include disulfide (S^{2−}_{2}), trisulfide (S^{2−}_{3}), tetrasulfide (S^{2−}_{4}), and pentasulfide (S^{2−}_{5}). In principle, but not in practice, the chain lengths could be longer. The salts are dark red solids that dissolve in water to give highly alkaline and corrosive solutions. In air, these salts oxidize, and they evolve hydrogen sulfide by hydrolysis.

== Structure ==
The polysulfide anions form chains with S−S bond distances around 200 pm in length. The chains adopt skewed conformations. In the solid state, these salts are dense solids with strong association of the sodium cations with the anionic termini of the chains.

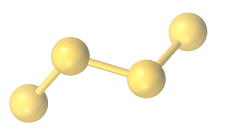
S^{2−}_{4} from the crystal structure, highlighting its skewed conformation.

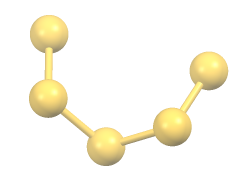
S^{2−}_{5} from the crystal structure, highlighting its skewed conformation.

== Production and occurrence ==
Sodium polysulfide can be produced by dissolving sulfur in a solution of sodium sulfide. Alternatively they are produced by the redox reaction of aqueous sodium hydroxide with sulfur at elevated temperatures. Finally they arise by the reduction of elemental sulfur with sodium, a reaction often conducted in anhydrous ammonia.

These salts are used in the production of polysulfide polymers, as a chemical fungicide, as a blackening agent on copper jewellery, as a component in a polysulfide bromide battery, as a toner in a photochemical solution, and in the tanning industry to remove hair from hides.

== Reactions ==
As exploited in the sodium-sulfur battery, the polysulfides absorb and release reducing equivalents by breaking and making S-S bonds, respectively. An idealized reaction for sodium tetrasulfide is shown:

Na_{2}S_{4} + 2 Na ⇌ 2 Na_{2}S_{2}

Alkylation gives organic polysulfides according to the following idealized equation:

Na_{2}S_{4} + 2 RX → 2 NaX + R_{2}S_{4}

Alkylation with an organic dihalide gives polymers called thiokols.

Protonation of these salts gives hydrogen sulfide and elemental sulfur, as illustrated by the reaction of sodium pentasulfide:

Na_{2}S_{5} + 2 HCl → H_{2}S + 4 S + 2 NaCl
