= Dispersive =

Dispersive may refer to:

- Dispersive partial differential equation, a partial differential equation where waves of different wavelength propagate at different phase velocities
- Dispersive phase from Biological dispersal
- Dispersive medium, a medium in which waves of different frequencies travel at different velocities
- Dispersive adhesion, adhesion which attributes attractive forces between two materials to intermolecular interactions between molecules
- Dispersive mass transfer, the spreading of mass from highly concentrated areas to less concentrated areas
- Dispersive body waves, an aspect of seismic theory
- Dispersive prism, an optical prism
- Dispersive hypothesis, a DNA replication predictive hypothesis
- Dispersive fading, in wireless communication signals
- Dispersive line
- Dispersive power

== See also ==
- Dispersal (disambiguation)
- Dispersion (disambiguation)
