= Microtubular membrane =

A microtubular membrane is a type of membrane made up of small tubular structures. Microtubular associated membranes are found in various cell types and are essential for maintaining cell structure and function. Synthetic membranes are used in chemical separation processes and in flow batteries.

== Biology ==
Cytoskeletal proteins interact with lipid bilayer membranes via interaction with peripheral or integral membrane proteins or through specific domains of cytoskeletal proteins with the lipid bilayer. A characteristic feature of protozoan parasites is an ordered layer of microtubules beneath the cell membrane.

The interaction between microtubules and the plasma membrane provide support, shape, and stability to the cell, as well as act as tracks for transporting materials within the cell. Overall, microtubular membranes are vital components of cellular organization and function. Animal cells (and some filamentous fungi are thought to rely upon the microtubule cytoskeleton and associated motor proteins. Although plants, algae and fungi transport depends on myosins, which move along the actin cytoskeleton, certain organelles can move along microtubules in plant cells.

== Applications ==
=== Flow battery ===
Sub-millimeter, bundled microtubular (SBMT) membrane mitigate membrane pressure, which allows ions to pass through without additional support infrastructure This reduces the cost and size of the battery. A demonstration cells displayed higher peak charge and discharge power densities of 1,322 W/L_{cell} and 306.1 W/L_{cell}, respectively, compared with <60 W/L_{cell} and 45 W/L_{cell}, for conventional (planar) flow cells. SBMT's reduced the inter=membrane distance by ~100-fold and eliminated bulky flow distributors. The battery architecture is compatible with multiple chemistries, including zinc- oxide, zinc–bromide, quinone–bromide, and vanadium.

== See also ==
- Nanotube membrane
