= Solid dispersion redox flow battery =

A solid dispersion redox flow battery is a type of redox flow battery using dispersed solid active materials as the energy storage media. The solid suspensions are stored in energy storage tanks and pumped through electrochemical cells while charging or discharging. In comparison with a conventional redox flow battery where active species are dissolved in aqueous or organic electrolyte, the active materials in a solid dispersion redox flow battery maintain the solid form and are suspended in the electrolyte. Further development expanded the applicable active materials. The solid active materials, especially with active materials from lithium-ion battery, can help the suspensions achieve much higher energy densities than conventional redox flow batteries. This concept is similar to semi-solid flow batteries in which slurries of active materials accompanied by conductive carbon additives to facilitate electrons conducting are stored in energy storage tanks and pumped through the electrochemical reaction cells. Based upon this technique, an analytical method was developed to measure the electrochemical performance of lithium-ion battery active materials, named dispersed particle resistance (DPR).
