= Iron redox flow battery =

Type of flow battery technology

Iron redox flow batteries (IRFB), (aka iron salt battery), uses the electrochemical reaction of iron salt. It belongs to the class of redox-flow batteries (RFB), which are alternatives to Lithium-Ion Batteries (LIB) for stationary applications. An IRFB can achieve up to 70% round trip energy efficiency. In comparison, other long duration storage technologies such as pumped hydro energy storage provide around 80% round trip energy efficiency.

== Design ==
IRFBs consist of two tanks, each of which is a battery half-cell. The tanks store electrolytes of dissolved iron(II) ions. The redox reaction takes place at the electrode within each half-cell. These can be carbon-based porous felts, paper or cloth. Porous felts offer the useful largest surface area.

The bipolar and monopolar plates are typically carbon-based materials. The monopolar plates are in contact with the respective electrode and the current collector. Bipolar plates separate adjacent cells and are in contact with a positive electrode on one side and a negative electrode on the other. The half-cells are separated by a separator. This can be an anionic exchange membrane, a cationic exchange membrane or a porous separator. During the reaction, the charge within the electrolyte is balanced by migration of charged species through the separator. This can be H^{+} with a cationic exchange membrane, Cl^{−} with an anionic exchange membrane, or both with a porous separator. The advantage of using a membrane lies in the high selectivity of the species crossing the separator. The porous separator is a cheaper alternative often with low resistivity. However, the species crossover is solely dependent on the size of the separators' pores and the size of the species. Therefore, the porous separator is less selective. The crossover of iron(III) from the positive to the negative half-cell can cost coulombic efficiency, because it reacts with the iron(0) on the negative side (Reaction 5).

The single cells are then stacked and electrically connected in series via bipolar plates, forming a battery stack.

== Reactions ==
Energy storage is based on the electrochemical reaction of iron. During charge, Fe^{2+}oxidizes to Fe^{3+} in the positive half-cell (Reaction 1) while in the negative half-cell iron(II) is reduced to Fe^{0} (Reaction 2). The latter reaction is also called the plating reaction, as Fe^{0} deposits on the negative electrode. During discharge, the plated Fe^{0} dissolves into the electrolyte forming Fe^{2+}, while Fe^{3+} reduces to Fe^{2+} in the positive half-cell.

Positive half-cell:	2 Fe^{2+}_{(aq)} → 2 Fe^{3+}_{(aq)} + 2 e^{−}	E^{0} = +0.77 V	(1)
Negative half-cell:	Fe^{2+}_{(aq)} + 2 e^{−} → Fe^{0}_{(s)}	E^{0} = -0.44 V	(2)
Overall reaction:	3 Fe^{2+}_{(aq)} → 2 Fe^{3+}_{(aq)} + Fe^{0}_{(s)}	ΔE^{0} = 1.21 V	(3)

Nominal cell voltage is 1.21 V. The color of the positive electrolyte changes during charge and discharge, with Fe^{3+} chloride having a brown color while iron(II) chloride is light green.

=== Side reactions ===
Unwanted side reactions cost coulombic efficiency and capacity, because charge is irreversibly lost.

The acidic iron electrolyte can oxidize in contact with air, therefore, mitigating measures, e.g., operating under inert atmosphere, are necessary to prevent oxidation (Reaction 4).

Air oxidation: 4 Fe^{2+}_{(aq)} + O_{2} + 4 H^{+} → 4 Fe^{3+}_{(aq)}+ 2 H_{2}O (4)

Further, Fe^{3+} can migrate through the separator and react with the plated Fe^{0} on the negative side forming Fe^{2+}. This migration is most common when using a microporous separator (Reaction 5).

Crossover reaction: Fe^{3+}_{(aq)}+ Fe^{0}_{(s)}⇌ 2 Fe^{2+}_{(aq)} (5)

During charge, hydrogen evolves, as the standard potential of the hydrogen evolution reaction (HER) lies between the standard potential of Fe^{2+}/Fe^{3+} and of Fe^{2+}/Fe^{0}. The acidic protons H^{+} in solution react to form hydrogen gas (Reaction 7) while Fe^{2+}oxidises in the positive half-cell (Reaction 6). The HER is pH dependent. At lower pH values, the concentration of H^{+} is high, which increases the kinetics of the side reaction. Over time, the pH increases on the negative side. At a pH ≥ ~4, insoluble iron hydroxide forms and deposits onto the separator. This increases resistance to ionic transfer, reduced coulombic and voltaic efficiency and ultimately cell failure.

Positive half-cell: Fe^{2+}_{(aq)} → Fe^{3+}_{(aq)} + e^{−} E^{0} = +0.77 V (6)

HER at negative half-cell: H^{+} + e^{−} → ½ H_{2(g)} E^{0} = 0.00 V (7)

Adding ascorbic acid to the electrolyte can reduce hydrogen evolution. Ascorbic acid increases coulombic efficiency by increasing the pH near the electrode, which improves iron deposition kinetics. Operating at 60°C with a pH of around 3 can achieve coulombic efficiency of 97.9%.

== Operating Conditions ==
=== pH ===
IRFBs need to operate at pH values below 3.5. The Fe^{3+} salt precipitates at pH > 3.5 forming insoluble Fe(OH)_{3} (rust). However, at low pH values more hydrogen evolves during charge on the negative side. Coulombic efficiency increases with pH values.

=== Temperature ===
Hruska et al. studied the temperature effect on performance. Voltaic efficiency increases at higher temperature due to higher electrolyte conductivity and a decrease in electrode polarisation. Additionally, higher temperatures of ~60 °C improve iron deposition kinetics in comparison to the hydrogen evolution reaction, thus increasing coulombic efficiency.

IRFBs can operate at lower temperatures (~ 5 °C), with reduced reaction kinetics, lowering voltaic efficiency.

=== Electrolyte composition ===
The base electrolyte consists of iron(II) salts dissolved in water. SO_{4}^{2-} or Cl^{−} are possible counter ions. Iron(II) chloride is often the preferred choice as its conductivity is higher than iron(II) sulphate. By increasing the ionic conductivity of the electrolyte, the voltaic efficiency, and thus the overall energy efficiency, can be increased. NH_{4}Cl, (NH_{4})_{2}SO_{4}, KCl, Na_{2}SO_{4} and NaCl are possible supporting additives.

Complexing iron salt with ligands can hinder the precipitation of Fe(OH)_{3} as the ligands stabilise the iron salt. Additives examined include citrate, DMSO, glycerol, malic acid, malonic acid, and xylitol.

Buffer additives (e.g., ascorbic acid) help to maintain a constant pH during hydrogen production. Additionally, these additives adsorb onto the electrode's active sites, blocking these sites for the H^{+} adsorption and increase overpotential for the hydrogen evolution reaction.

One challenge is to reduce the hydrogen evolution reaction. One method is through co-deposition of a different metal (e.g., cadmium), which can hinder the HER, and improve coulombic efficiency during iron deposition.

=== Rebalancing systems ===
Approaches to solving the issue with HER include additives in the electrolyte to reduce hydrogen production. However, additives cannot fully eliminate HER.

The HER counter reaction can be achieved chemically or electrochemically. Chemical solutions are trickle-bed reactors or in-tank hydrogen-ferric ion recombination systems. An electrochemical couples a hydrogen-iron fuel cell to the battery. This can return the IRFB to the original state.

The trickle-bed reactor is a chemical reactor with a packed bed containing a catalyst (e.g. platinum). This type of rebalancing system is coupled to the IRFB. The battery electrolyte is flushed into the packed bed from the top of the reactor while hydrogen gas is forwarded from the bottom. At the three-phase-boundary (catalyst, hydrogen gas, electrolyte) the chemical reaction between excess iron(III) and hydrogen takes place, forming iron(II) and H^{+}. The excess gas removed from the trickle-bed reactor and the electrolyte is then returned to the IRFB.

The in-tank rebalancing system is based on the chemical reaction of iron(III) and H_{2}, but takes place in the positive tank. Hydrogen produced within the negative tank is forwarded to the positive tank. A felt is positioned perpendicular to the liquid level in the positive electrolyte. The upper part is coated with a catalytic layer (e.g. platinum). Through capillary effect, positive electrolyte flows through the felt to the catalytic layer. Here, at the three-phase boundary (catalyst, H_{2}, Fe^{3+}) the chemical reaction takes place forming H^{+} and Fe^{2+}.

A different option is to couple the IRFB with a hydrogen-iron fuel cell. The produced hydrogen from the IRFB is forwarded to the negative side of the rebalancing fuel cell system whilst the IRFB electrolyte is pumped to the positive side. On the negative side, the hydrogen reacts to H^{+} at a catalytic layer (e.g., platinum or palladium). On the positive side, the excess Fe^{3+} is reduced to Fe^{2+} (Reaction 8).

Rebalancing Reaction: 2 Fe^{3+}_{(aq)} + ½ H_{2 (g)} → 2 Fe^{2+}_{(aq)} + H^{+} (8)

== Comparison ==
=== Advantages ===
The advantage of redox-flow batteries is the independent scalability of power and energy, which makes them candidates for stationary energy storage systems. This is because the power is dependent only on the stack size while the capacity is dependent only on the electrolyte volume.

The aqueous electrolyte is non-flammable. Electrolyte components are non-toxic and abundant. The reactants in both half-cells are soluble salts of the same species and differ only in their oxidation state (Fe^{0}, Fe^{2+}, Fe^{3+}). This means that unwanted membrane crossover of the active species does not lead to irreversible reactant loss. It can be rebalanced using either a trickle-bed reactor or a fuel cell. Iron chloride is cheaply and widely available as a by-product of steel production.

The IRFB is stable within different temperature ranges, therefore, the stationary energy storage can be used in regions with higher temperature without the need of a thermal management system. Battery efficiency benefits from higher temperatures. Other battery types (e.g. vanadium redox flow batteries) cannot perform at higher temperatures. For instance, toxic vanadium pentoxide (V_{2}O_{5}) in VRFBs precipitates at ~40 °C.

Overall, the components are low in cost (2 $/kg iron) and abundant. Materials for the other parts (e.g. membrane, bipolar plate, monopolar plate, frames, gaskets, pumps) are widely available. Associated costs can be expected to decrease with production scale.

Lithium-ion batteries offer expected lifetimes of ~1000 cycles, while IRFB promises a potential battery lifetime of > 20 years with over 10.000 cycles.

=== Disadvantages ===
The capacity is not solely dependent on electrolyte volume as is the case with other RFBs that are based on electrochemical reactions in solution (e.g. VRFB). Rather, in an IRFB the plating iron volume within the negative half-cell has an influence on capacity. Thus, energy capacity and stack size are not completely decoupled, as is the case with other RFB.

During the charge reaction, hydrogen evolves on the negative side, reducing coulombic efficiency. Additionally, the pH increase leads to insoluble Fe(OH)_{3} (rust) precipitation which untreated can lead to cell death. However, a rebalancing system can bring the IRFB back to a state of health.

Compared to non-RFB systems, all flow batteries include auxiliary components such as pumps and valves, which do require a regular maintenance cycle.

== Application ==
The IRFB can be used as large-scale energy storage systems to store energy at low demand from renewable energy sources (e.g., solar, wind, water) and release the energy at higher demand. As the energy transition from fossil fuels to renewable energy sources is progressing, the demand for storing the excess energy is increasing.

ESS Inc. is an American company developing and building IRFBs with > 20.000 cycles, storing energy of 4 to 12 hours, with capacities up to 600 kWh and optional power configurations between 50 kW and 90 kW. Sacramento Municipal Utility District installed an iron flow battery in September 2022.

In 2025, Saudi Aramco commissioned a 1 MWh iron–vanadium flow battery at Wa’ad Al-Shamal, Saudi Arabia, to support gas production activities.

VoltStorage GmbH was a German based company focusing on the European market. The goal was to develop cascadeable batteries up to 5 x 50 kWh with 9.4 MW or 234 MWh per acre with efficiencies of 70%, with a lifetime of > 20 years and > 10.000 cycles. A 1 MW demonstrator plant was developed, however the company could not stay feasible, and closed in 2025.

== History ==
Hruska et al. introduced the IRFB in 1981 and in terms of material choice, electrolyte additives, temperature and pH effect. The group set the groundwork for further development. In 1979, Thaller et al. introduced an iron-hydrogen fuel cell as a rebalancing cell for a chromium-iron redox flow battery which was adapted 1983 for iron-redox flow batteries by Stalnake et al. Further development went into the fuel cell as a separate system.

Petek et al. substituted the solid felt electrodes with slurry electrodes (e.g. MWCNT). Research groups analysed additives to minimise HER. Noack et al. investigated supporting salts (e.g. K^{+}, Cs^{+}, Mg^{2+}, Al^{3+}), identifying secondary metals in 2021 with Cu, Tl, Pd and Cd as promising metals.

Adding ligands to the electrolyte, thus forming iron complexes, increases cell voltage. Gong et al. mixed redox pairs with ligands and increased the cell voltage from 1.2 V to 1.34 V with [Fe(CN)_{6}]^{3-} / [Fe(CN)_{6}]^{4-} and [Fe(TEOA)OH]^{−} / [Fe(TEOA)OH]^{2-} in an alkaline environment.

Rebalancing systems were analysed: Noack et al. investigated coupling the IRFB with a fuel cell as a rebalancing system.

== Data ==
Power density	47 mW/cm² at 75 mA/cm²
Energy Efficiency	70% at 12.5 mA/cm²
Nominal cell voltage:	1.2 V
Operating temperature range	5 – 60 °C
