= Hydrogen–bromine battery =

A hydrogen–bromine battery is a rechargeable flow battery in which hydrogen bromide (HBr) serves as the system’s electrolyte. During the charge cycle, as power flows into the stack, H_{2} is generated and stored in a separate tank, the other product of the chemical reaction is HBr_{3} which accumulates in the electrolyte. During the discharge cycle the H_{2} is combined again with the HBr_{3} and the system returns to its initial stage with a full tank of HBr. The electrolyte suffers no degradation during the process and the system is self contained with no emissions.

The first scaled up version of this battery, a 50KW/100KWh system, has been deployed in Rotem Industrial Park in Israel. A beta commercial system, sized at 150KW/900KWh, is to be deployed in June 2016 by a consortium including AREVA, Schneider Electric and EnStorage.

The main advantage of the battery is its cost. Bromine is inexpensive, with more than 400,000 tons produced annually worldwide. The cost of the electrolyte is about $20/kWh. Additional advantages include the use on inexpensive membranes and high power density relative to other flow batteries.

A different approach of the battery relies on laminar flow to separate the two materials instead of a membrane, reacting liquid bromine with hydrogen gas to generate electricity. The first such battery pumped bromine over a graphite cathode and hydrobromic acid under a porous anode, along with hydrogen gas. The device operated at room temperature with a maximum power density of 0.795 watts of per cubic centimeter. Observed performance matched the predictions of a mathematical model that described the chemical reactions. No membranless system has been scaled up, mainly due to balance of plant complexity matters.

There is a European Union funded project under way which includes installation of hydrogen–bromine batteries in the Hinnøya island cluster. The project, launched in 2019, is a renewable energy system with multiple sources. It is due for delivery in 2021.

Bromine is relatively inexpensive, with more than 243,000 tons produced annually in the U.S. Operation without a membrane reduces cost and increases battery lifetime.

== Applications ==
HBr redox flow batteries are optimal for applications that require daily discharge cycles for long duration discharge periods (i.e. 6–12 hours per day) for a relatively long deployment (i.e. 10–20 years). Typical applications would include integration of renewables, deferral of infrastructure investment, peak management and micro grids.

Specifically for renewables, low-cost energy storage is required to enable renewable energy sources with varying and even intermittent output, such as solar and wind power. The storage buffers the varying output of the renewable source, allowing such sources to be considered baseline power.

== Advantages ==
For the production of a HBr redox flow battery no rare metals like lithium or cobalt are required, but the hydrogen electrode requires a precious metal catalyst. Moreover, the energy density of the system is generally higher than other redox flow battery systems.

An HBr flow battery is a combined electrolyser and fuel cell. In the first prototypes, the hydrogen gas is stored in a separate, expensive, tank. In Vlissingen (The Netherlands), the Dutch company Elestor is building a flow battery together with Vopak that can be integrated in a hydrogen pipeline as a virtual hydrogen tank in the future. So that the HBr flow battery shall be working as a separate electrolyser and fuel cell. https://www.offshorewindinnovators.nl/news/flow-battery-elestor-offers-large-scale-storage-of-electricity

== Disadvantages ==
Among the disadvantages of a H_{2}-Br_{2} flow battery are low energy density (less than that of lithium-ion batteries) and a complex balance of plant. These drawbacks prevent the use of H_{2}-Br_{2} flow batteries in transportation applications. The next stage in the development of hydrogen–bromine flow battery is hydrogen–bromate flow battery. Concentrated solutions of HBr are highly corrosive, which requires chemically stable sealing solutions to ensure long term operation.
