= Cerium(III) methanesulfonate =

Names
- Other names: Cerous methanesulfonate; Cerium(III) mesylate

Identifiers
CAS Number	73640-09-2; 77998-20-0 (dihydrate)
3D model (JSmol)	Interactive image
ChemSpider	10000696
PubChem CID	11826045
- InChI: InChI=1S/3CH4O3S.Ce/c3*1-5(2,3)4;/h3*1H3,(H,2,3,4);/q;;;+3/p-3 Key: XPQVQIJYDXCEKC-UHFFFAOYSA-K; InChI=1/3CH4O3S.Ce/c3*1-5(2,3)4;/h3*1H3,(H,2,3,4);/q;;;+3/p-3 Key: XPQVQIJYDXCEKC-DFZHHIFOAL
- SMILES: CS(=O)(=O)[O-].CS(=O)(=O)[O-].CS(=O)(=O)[O-].[Ce+3]

Properties
Chemical formula	Ce(CH_{3}SO_{3})_{3}
Molar mass	461.46 g/mol
Appearance	White crystalline solid
Solubility in water	Insoluble in water
- Except where otherwise noted, data are given for materials in their standard state (at 25 °C [77 °F], 100 kPa). Infobox references

Cerium(III) methanesulfonate is a white salt, usually found as the dihydrate with the formula Ce(CH_{3}SO_{3})_{3}·2H_{2}O that precipitates from the neutralisation of cerium(III) carbonate with methanesulfonic acid, as first reported by L.B. Zinner in 1979. The crystals have a monoclinic polymeric structure were each methanesulfonate ion forms bonds with two cerium atoms, which present a coordination number of 8. The anhydrous salt is formed by water loss at 120 °C. Similar methanesulfonates can be prepared with other lanthanides. Cerium(III) methanesulfonate in solution is used as a precursor of electrogenerated cerium(IV), which is a strong oxidant and whose salts can be used in organic synthesis. The same principle of Ce(IV) electrogeneration is the fundamental reaction in the positive half-cell of the zinc–cerium battery.

== See also ==
- Cerium
- Zinc–cerium battery
