= ESS Tech =

American battery manufacturer

ESS Tech, Inc.
- Type: Public
- Traded as: OTC: GWHT (formerly NYSE: GWH)
- Industry: Energy storage
- Founded: 2011
- Defunct: November 13, 2026
- Fate: Ceased operations; liquidation under Chapter 7 of the United States Bankruptcy Code
- Headquarters: Wilsonville, Oregon, United States
- Products: Iron flow batteries, sodium-ion storage systems

ESS Tech, Inc. was an American manufacturer of iron flow batteries for long-duration energy storage, based in Wilsonville, Oregon. It was founded in 2011 and listed on the New York Stock Exchange in 2021 through a merger with a special purpose acquisition company that valued it at about US$1.1 billion. The company expanded into sodium-ion systems in 2026, but ceased operations and filed for Chapter 7 bankruptcy on 13 November 2026.

== Technology ==
The company's iron flow batteries stored energy in an electrolyte of iron, salt and water, described as non-flammable and free of scarce materials, and were designed for discharge durations of four to twelve hours without capacity degradation. Its products included the containerised Energy Warehouse and the larger Energy Center, both of which were discontinued in early 2025 in favour of the Energy Base, a 12-to-14-hour system aimed at data centers and large renewable energy operators. In 2026 the company added sodium-ion systems using cells supplied by Alsym Energy under an 8.5 GWh letter of intent, and introduced Bridge, a modular 1.2 MWh unit for shorter-duration applications. It also acquired the intellectual property of the German flow battery developer VoltStorage. Deliveries and contracts included a 5 MW/50 MWh iron flow system for the Salt River Project in Arizona, a collaboration that also involved Google, and a US$9.9 million contract with the United States Air Force Research Laboratory for up to 27 MWh at Clear Space Force Station, Alaska.

== Delisting ==
On 24 September 2026 the NYSE began delisting proceedings under a standard requiring either US$50 million of stockholders' equity or US$50 million of market capitalisation. Trading was suspended on 2 October and the shares moved to the over-the-counter market as GWHT. On 13 November 2026 the company ceased operations, terminated all of its employees and filed a voluntary Chapter 7 petition in the United States Bankruptcy Court for the District of Delaware, stating that its assets would be liquidated and that holders of its common stock were unlikely to receive any distribution.
