= Dispersal =

Dispersal may refer to:

- Biological dispersal, the movement of organisms away from aggregations of individuals such as movement from their birth site
  - Dispersal vector, forces that carry seeds for plants
  - Oceanic dispersal, the movement of terrestrial organisms from one land mass to another by sea-crossing
  - Seed dispersal, the movement or transport of seeds away from the parent plant
- Dispersal draft, a system in professional sports for reassigning players whose former team is defunct
- Dispersal of ownership, breaking up large media companies and media conglomerates to diversify ownership of property rights
- Dispersal (military), strategic spreading-out of military personnel and equipment to reduce collateral damage
- Dispersal prison, one of five secure prisons in the United Kingdom that houses Category A prisoners
- Dispersal index, for volcanic eruptions
- The dispersal area of an aerodrome, where aeroplanes are parked away from the runway.

== See also ==
- Dispersion (disambiguation)
- Dispersive (disambiguation)
- Dispersity, a measure of the heterogeneity of sizes of molecules or particles in a mixture
