= Little Barford =

Hamlet in Bedfordshire, England

Coordinates: 52.199°N 0.273°W

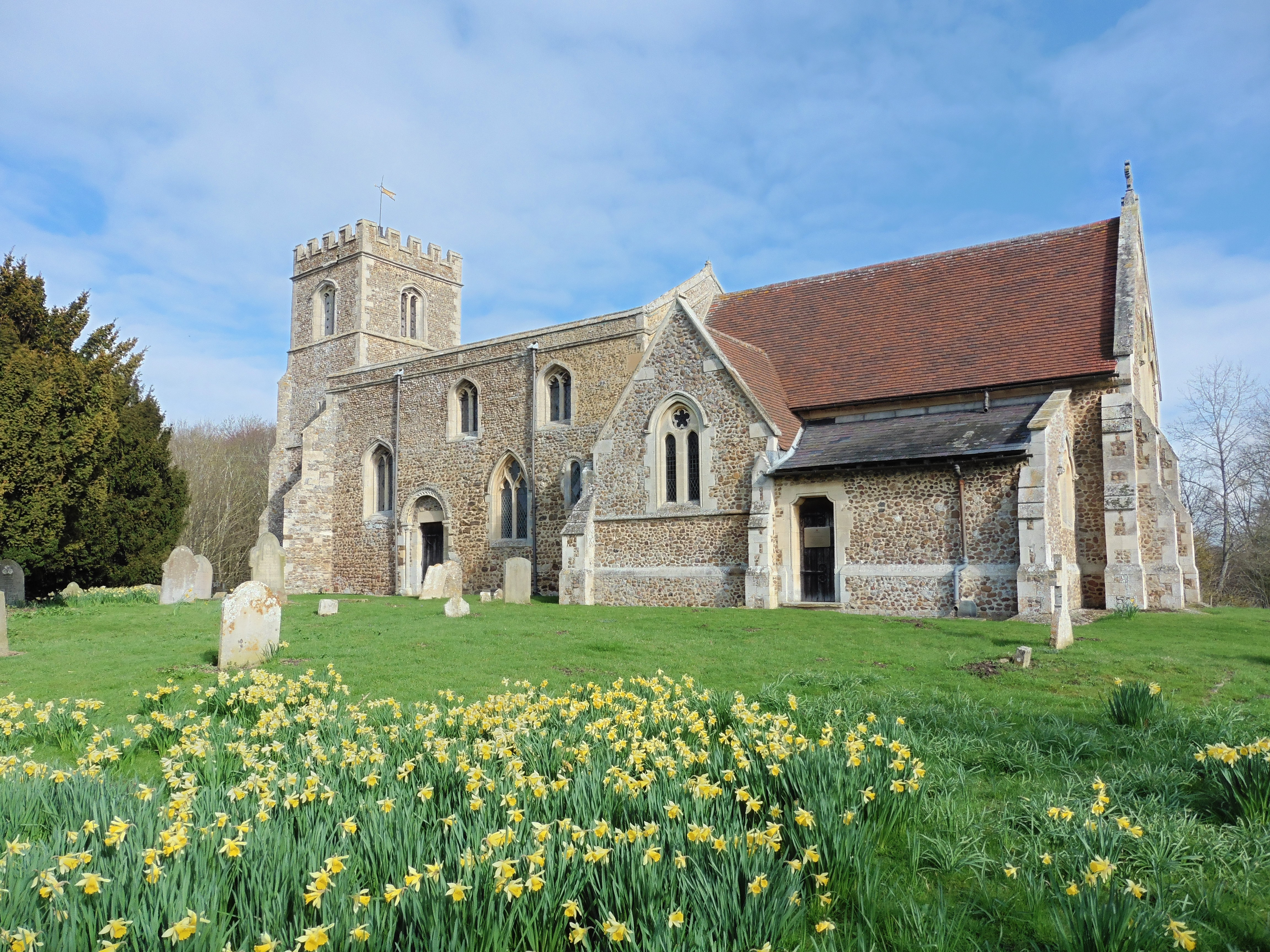
- St Denys, Little Barford

- Location within Bedfordshire
- Population: 44
- OS grid reference: TL181570
- District: Bedford
- Unitary authority: Bedford Borough Council
- Ceremonial county: Bedfordshire
- Region: East
- Country: England
- Sovereign state: United Kingdom
- Post town: ST NEOTS
- Postcode district: PE19
- Dialling code: 01480
- Police: Bedfordshire
- Fire: Bedfordshire
- Ambulance: East of England
- UK Parliament: North Bedfordshire

Little Barford is a hamlet and civil parish in the Borough of Bedford in Bedfordshire, England about 7 miles (11 km) northeast of the county town of Bedford.

The 2011 census combines other data for Little Barford with Wyboston, Chawston and Colesden civil parish but its population is separately shown as 44.

Little Barford Power Station is in the parish.

== History ==
Population change in Little Barford since 1801
Year	Pop.	±%
1801	80	—
1841	190	+137.5%
1881	189	−0.5%
1921	121	−36.0%
1961	68	−43.8%
2001	42	−38.2%

The manor of Barford was held by the de Leyham family from about 1194, and then passed by inheritance into the de la Dale family in about 1316: the de la Dales owned Barford for two centuries, after which it passed by inheritance to the Fettiplace family, and subsequently to the Brownes.

A deserted medieval settlement in fields near to St Deny's Church is visible as earthworks on historic aerial photographs.

The parish church is dedicated to Saint Denys. The church became redundant in 1972 and is now in the care of the Churches Conservation Trust.

A school was built in 1872. It became a council school in 1914 and closed in 1932, but reopened from 1939 to 1945. The building still stands.

The coal fired Little Barford Power Station was opened in 1939, closed in 1981 and demolished in 1989. A new gas fired plant was built in 1994–96.

== Geography ==
Little Barford is 2 miles (3 km) south of St Neots, 17 miles (27 km) west of Cambridge and 48 miles (77 km) north of Central London.

The East Coast Mainline railway runs north–south through the parish.

=== Area ===
The civil parish covers an area of about 481 hectares (1,189 acres).

The parish's northern boundary is the A428 road, Cambridgeshire is to the east and Central Bedfordshire to the south. The River Great Ouse forms its western boundary.

=== Landscape ===
The hamlet lies within the Bedfordshire and Cambridgeshire Claylands as designated by Natural England. Bedford Borough Council classifies the local landscape as the Great Ouse Clay Valley around and west of the village, and the eastern part of the parish as within the Biggin Wood Clay Vale that extends northwards from Central Bedfordshire. The surrounding area is mostly arable farmland. The northernmost part of the parish between the railway and the Great Ouse is taken up by the power station and industrial units.

=== Cottages ===
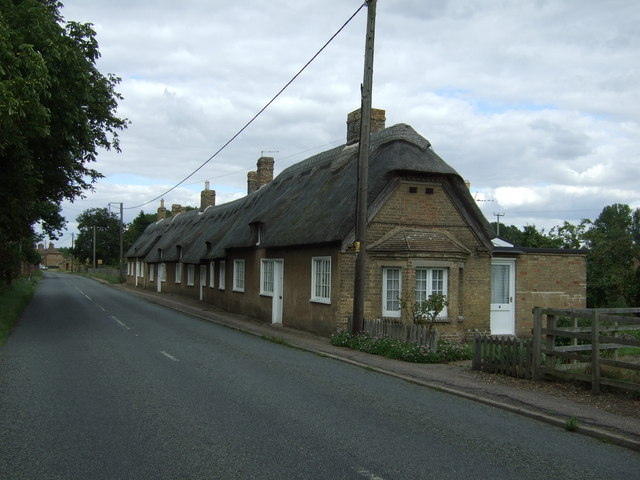
Row it thatched cottages

A row of four Grade II listed 18th century rough cast, thatched cottages stand by the roadside. One is detached, the remainder are terraced. At the northern end of the hamlet are four pairs of late 19th century semi-detached estate cottages having yellow brickwork with red brick dressings.

=== Elevation ===
The hamlet is 20 metres (66 ft) above sea level. The whole parish is mainly low lying and flat, although the land does rise to 60 metres (197 ft) in the southeast corner of the parish.

=== Geology and soil type ===
The hamlet lies mainly on first and second terrace river gravel and glacial gravel. Boulder clay is to the east. Alluvium borders the Great Ouse. Underlying these superficial deposits and also in part at the surface is Oxford clay and Kellaways beds.

Around the hamlet the soil has low fertility, is freely draining and slightly acid with a loamy texture. The eastern part of the parish has highly fertile, lime-rich loamy and clayey soils with impeded drainage. By the Great Ouse are loamy and clayey floodplain soils with naturally high groundwater.

=== Night sky and light pollution ===
Light pollution is the level of radiance (night lights) shining up into the night sky. The Campaign to Protect Rural England (CPRE) divides the level of night sky brightness into 9 bands with band 1 being the darkest i.e. with the lowest level of light pollution and band 9 the brightest and most polluted. Little Barford in bands 6 and 7 is adversely affected by lighting at the power station and Arlington Road Industrial Estate. The night sky is darker looking southeast.

=== Public footpaths ===
The sole public footpath runs from opposite the last cottage at the northern end of the hamlet to the Ouse and onwards to link with the Ouse Valley Way.

== Businesses ==
The Alington Road estate has an office centre, units for a number of service companies, and a Marshall Motor Group dealership. Laing O'Rourke has premises on Barford Road including land for storing cranes. Waste disposal company Biffa also has a depot.

== Notable residents ==
- Thomas de la Dale, Lord Chief Justice of Ireland — born in Little Barford in about 1317
- Nicholas Rowe — dramatic poet was born in Little Barford in 1674.
- Artist Mike Chaplin — known to many as resident art expert on Watercolour Challenge was born in Little Barford in 1943
