= Flow battery =

Type of electrochemical cell

A flow battery, or redox flow battery (after reduction–oxidation), is a type of electrochemical cell where chemical energy is provided by two chemical components dissolved in liquids that are pumped through the system on separate sides of a membrane. Ion transfer inside the cell (accompanied by current flow through an external circuit) occurs across the membrane while the liquids circulate in their respective spaces.

A flow battery may be used like a fuel cell (where new charged negolyte (a.k.a. reducer or fuel) and charged posolyte (a.k.a. oxidant) are added to the system) or like a rechargeable battery (where an electric power source drives regeneration of the reducer and oxidant).

The fundamental difference between conventional and flow batteries is that energy is stored in the electrode material in conventional batteries, while in flow batteries it is stored in the electrolyte in separate tanks. According to Battery Council International, this provides flow batteries with advantages for scalability and long-duration energy storage capabilities, making them ideal for stationary applications that demand consistent and reliable power.

Flow batteries have certain technical advantages over conventional rechargeable batteries with solid electroactive materials, such as independent scaling of power (determined by the size of the stack) and of energy (determined by the size of the tanks), long cycle and calendar life, and potentially lower total cost of ownership at multi-hour half cycle design times. However, flow batteries suffer from a lower cycle energy efficiency (50–80%). This drawback stems from the need to operate flow batteries at high (≥ 100 mA/cm^{2}) current densities to reduce the effect of internal crossover (through the membrane/separator) and to reduce the cost of power (size of stacks). Also, most flow batteries (Zn−Cl_{2}, Zn−Br_{2} and H_{2}−LiBrO_{4} are exceptions) have lower specific energy (heavier weight) than lithium-ion batteries. The heavier weight results mostly from the need to use a solvent (usually water) to maintain the redox active species in the liquid phase.

Cell voltage is chemically determined by the Nernst equation and ranges, in practical applications, from 1.0 to 2.43 volts. The energy capacity increased with the volume of the fluids in the tanks, and the power increases with the size of the stack.

Flow batteries can be classified using different schemes:

1. Full-flow (where all reagents are in fluid phases: gases, liquids, or liquid solutions), such as vanadium redox flow battery vs semi-flow, where one or more electroactive phases are solid, such as zinc-bromine battery.
2. Type of reagents: inorganic vs. organic and organic forms. As of 2025, only inorganic RFBs have been demonstrated on a commercial scale. Organic RFBs often suffer from poor durability.
3. By cell separator design: Membrane RFBs vs membraneless RFB.

Patent Classifications for flow batteries had not been fully developed as of 2021. Cooperative Patent Classification considers flow batteries as a subclass of regenerative fuel cell (H01M8/18), even though it is more appropriate to consider fuel cells as a subclass of flow batteries.

== History ==
The zinc–bromine flow battery (Zn−Br_{2}) was the original flow battery. John Doyle file patent US 224404 on September 29, 1879. Zn-Br2 batteries have relatively high specific energy, and were demonstrated in electric cars in the 1970s.

Walther Kangro, an Estonian chemist working in Germany in the 1950s, was the first to demonstrate flow batteries based on dissolved transition metal ions: Ti–Fe and Cr–Fe. After initial experimentations with Ti–Fe redox flow battery (RFB) chemistry, NASA and groups in Japan and elsewhere selected Cr–Fe chemistry for further development. Mixed solutions (i.e. comprising both chromium and iron species in the negolyte and in the posolyte) were used in order to reduce the effect of time-varying concentration during cycling.

In the late 1980s, Sum, Rychcik and Skyllas-Kazacos at the University of New South Wales (UNSW) in Australia demonstrated vanadium RFB chemistry UNSW filed several patents related to VRFBs, that were later licensed to Japanese, Thai and Canadian companies, which tried to commercialize this technology with varying success.

Organic redox flow batteries emerged in 2009.

In 2022, Dalian, China began operating a 400 MWh, 100 MW vanadium flow battery, then the largest of its type.

Sumitomo Electric has built flow batteries for use in Taiwan, Belgium, Australia, Morocco and California. Hokkaido's flow battery farm was the biggest in the world when it opened in April 2022—until China deployed one eight times larger that can match the output of a natural gas plant.

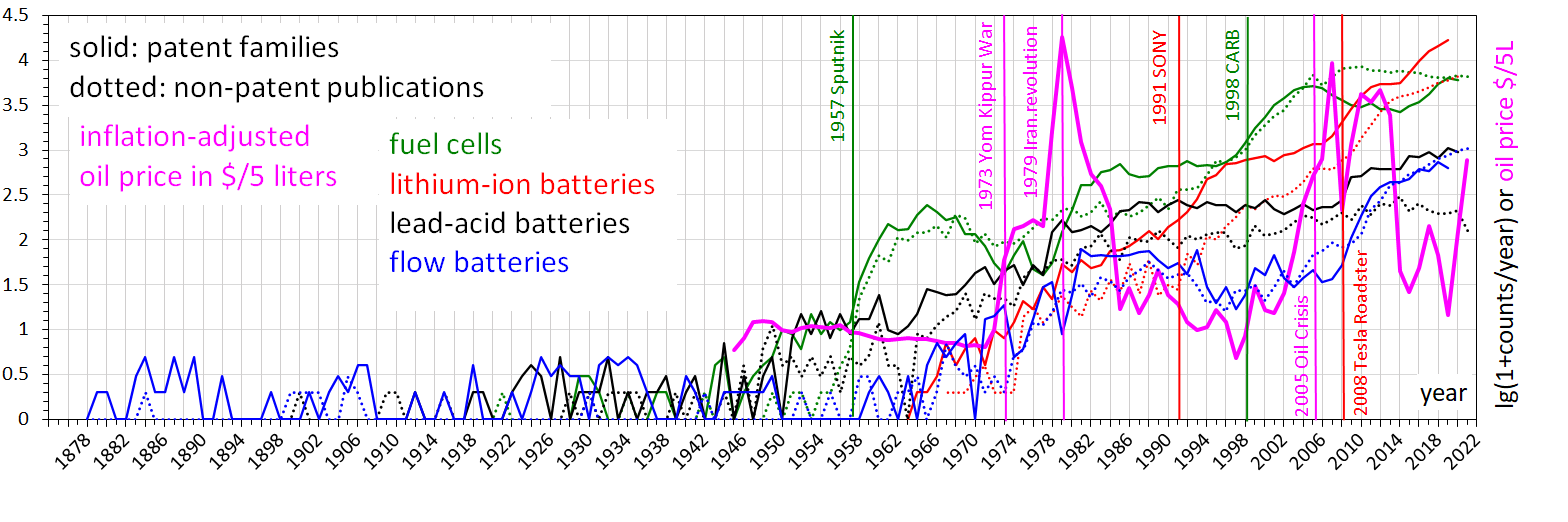
The log number of publications related to electrochemical power sources by year. Also shown as the magenta line is the inflation-adjusted oil price in US$/liter in linear scale

== Design ==
A flow battery is a rechargeable fuel cell in which an electrolyte containing one or more dissolved electroactive elements flows through an electrochemical cell that reversibly converts chemical energy to electrical energy. Electroactive elements are "elements in solution that can take part in an electrode reaction or that can be adsorbed on the electrode."

Electrolyte is stored externally, generally in tanks, and is typically pumped through the cell (or cells) of the reactor. Flow batteries can be rapidly "recharged" by replacing discharged electrolyte liquid (analogous to refueling internal combustion engines) while recovering the spent material for recharging. They can also be recharged in situ. Many flow batteries use carbon felt electrodes due to its low cost and adequate electrical conductivity, despite their limited power density due to their low inherent activity toward many redox couples. The amount of electricity that can be generated depends on the volume of electrolyte.

Flow batteries are governed by the design principles of electrochemical engineering.

== Evaluation ==
Redox flow batteries, and to a lesser extent hybrid flow batteries, have the advantages of:

- Independent scaling of energy (tanks) and power (stack), which allows for a cost/weight/etc. optimization for each application
- Long cycle and calendar lives (because there are no solid-to-solid phase transitions, which degrade lithium-ion and related batteries)
- Quick response times
- No need for "equalisation" charging (the overcharging of a battery to ensure all cells have an equal charge)
- No harmful emissions
- Little/no self-discharge during idle periods
- Recycling of electroactive materials

Some types offer easy state-of-charge determination (through voltage dependence on charge), low maintenance and tolerance to overcharge/overdischarge.

They are safe because they typically do not contain flammable electrolytes, and electrolytes can be stored away from the power stack.

The main disadvantages are:

- Low energy density (large tanks are required to store useful amounts of energy)
- Low charge and discharge rates. This implies large electrodes and membrane separators, increasing cost.
- Lower energy efficiency, because they operate at higher current densities to minimize the effects of cross-over (internal self-discharge) and to reduce cost.

Flow batteries typically have a higher energy efficiency than fuel cells, but lower than lithium-ion batteries.

Conventional flow battery chemistries have both low specific energy (which makes them too heavy for fully electric vehicles) and low specific power (which makes them too expensive for stationary energy storage). However a high power of 1.4 W/cm^{2} was demonstrated for hydrogen–bromine flow batteries, and a high specific energy (530 Wh/kg at the tank level) was shown for hydrogen–bromate flow batteries

== Conventional flow batteries ==
The redox cell uses redox-active species in fluid (liquid or gas) media. Redox flow batteries are rechargeable (secondary) cells. Because they employ heterogeneous electron transfer rather than solid-state diffusion or intercalation they are more similar to fuel cells than to conventional batteries. The main reason fuel cells are not considered to be batteries is that originally (in the 1800s) fuel cells emerged as a means to produce electricity directly from fuels (and air) via a non-combustion electrochemical process. Later, particularly in the 1960s and 1990s, rechargeable fuel cells (i.e. H_{2}/O_{2}, such as unitized regenerative fuel cells in NASA's Helios Prototype) were developed.

Cr–Fe chemistry has disadvantages, including hydrate isomerism (i.e. the equilibrium between electrochemically active Cr^{3+} chloro-complexes and inactive hexa-aqua complex and hydrogen evolution on the negode. Hydrate isomerism can be alleviated by adding chelating amino-ligands, while hydrogen evolution can be mitigated by adding Pb salts to increase the H_{2} overvoltage and Au salts for catalyzing the chromium electrode reaction.

Conventional redox flow battery chemistries include iron-chromium, vanadium, polysulfide–bromide (Regenesys), and uranium. Redox fuel cells are less common commercially although many have been proposed.

=== Vanadium ===
Vanadium redox flow batteries are the commercial leaders. They use vanadium at both electrodes, so they do not suffer cross-contamination. The limited solubility of vanadium salts, somewhat offsets this advantage in practice. This chemistry's advantages include four oxidation states within the electrochemical voltage window of the graphite-aqueous acid interface, and thus the elimination of the mixing dilution, detrimental in Cr–Fe RFBs. More importantly for commercial success is the near-perfect match of the voltage window of carbon/aqueous acid interface with that of vanadium redox-couples. This extends the life of the low-cost carbon electrodes and reduces the impact of side reactions, such as H_{2} and O_{2} evolutions, resulting in many year durability and many cycle (15,000–20,000) lives, which in turn results in a record low levelized cost of energy (LCOE, system cost divided by usable energy, cycle life, and round-trip efficiency). These long lifetimes allow for the amortization of their relatively high capital cost (driven by vanadium, carbon felts, bipolar plates, and membranes). The LCOE is on the order of a few tens cents per kWh, much lower than of solid-state batteries and near the targets of 5 cents stated by US and EC government agencies. Major challenges include: low abundance and high costs of V_{2}O_{5} (> $30 / kg); parasitic reactions including hydrogen and oxygen evolution; and precipitation of V_{2}O_{5} during cycling.

== Hybrid ==
The hybrid flow battery (HFB) uses one or more electroactive components deposited as a solid layer. The major disadvantage is that this reduces decoupled energy and power. The cell contains one battery electrode and one fuel cell electrode. This type is limited in energy by the electrode surface area.

HFBs include zinc–bromine, zinc–cerium, soluble lead–acid, and all-iron flow batteries. Weng et al. reported a vanadium–metal hydride hybrid flow battery with an experimental OCV of 1.93 V and operating voltage of 1.70 V, relatively high values. It consists of a graphite felt positive electrode operating in a mixed solution of VOSO_{4} and H_{2}SO_{4}, and a metal hydride negative electrode in KOH aqueous solution. The two electrolytes of different pH are separated by a bipolar membrane. The system demonstrated good reversibility and high efficiencies in coulomb (95%), energy (84%), and voltage (88%). They reported improvements with increased current density, inclusion of larger 100 cm^{2} electrodes, and series operation. Preliminary data using a fluctuating simulated power input tested the viability toward kWh scale storage. In 2016, a high energy density Mn(VI)/Mn(VII)-Zn hybrid flow battery was proposed.

=== Zinc–polyiodide ===
A prototype zinc–polyiodide flow battery demonstrated an energy density of 167 Wh/L. Older zinc–bromide cells reach 70 Wh/L. For comparison, lithium iron phosphate batteries store 325 Wh/L. The zinc–polyiodide battery is claimed to be safer than other flow batteries given its absence of acidic electrolytes, nonflammability and operating range of −4 to 122 °F (−20 to 50 °C) that does not require extensive cooling circuitry, which would add weight and occupy space. One unresolved issue is zinc buildup on the negative electrode that can permeate the membrane, reducing efficiency. Because of the Zn dendrite formation, Zn-halide batteries cannot operate at high current density (> 20 mA/cm^{2}) and thus have limited power density. Adding alcohol to the electrolyte of the ZnI battery can help. The drawbacks of Zn/I RFB lie are the high cost of Iodide salts (> $20 / kg); limited area capacity of Zn deposition, reducing the decoupled energy and power; and Zn dendrite formation.

When the battery is fully discharged, both tanks hold the same electrolyte solution: a mixture of positively charged zinc ions (Zn^{2+}) and negatively charged iodide ion, (I^{−}). When charged, one tank holds another negative ion, polyiodide, (I_{3}^{−}). The battery produces power by pumping liquid across the stack where the liquids mix. Inside the stack, zinc ions pass through a selective membrane and change into metallic zinc on the stack's negative side. To increase energy density, bromide ions (Br^{−}) are used as the complexing agent to stabilize the free iodine, forming iodine–bromide ions (I_{2}Br^{−}) as a means to free up iodide ions for charge storage.

=== Proton flow ===
Proton-flow batteries (PFB) integrate a metal hydride storage electrode into a reversible proton-exchange membrane (PEM) fuel cell. During charging, PFB combines hydrogen ions produced from splitting water with electrons and metal particles in one electrode of a fuel cell. The energy is stored in the form of a metal hydride solid. Discharge produces electricity and water when the process is reversed and the protons are combined with ambient oxygen. Metals less expensive than lithium can be used and provide greater energy density than lithium cells.

== Organic ==
Compared to inorganic redox flow batteries, such as vanadium and Zn−Br_{2} batteries, organic redox flow batteries' advantage is the tunable redox properties of their active components. As of 2021, organic RFB experienced low durability (i.e. calendar or cycle life, or both) and have not been demonstrated on a commercial scale.

Organic redox flow batteries can be further classified into aqueous (AORFBs) and non-aqueous (NAORFBs). AORFBs use water as solvent for electrolyte materials while NAORFBs employ organic solvents. AORFBs and NAORFBs can be further divided into total and hybrid systems. The former use only organic electrode materials, while the latter use inorganic materials for either anode or cathode. In larger-scale energy storage, lower solvent cost and higher conductivity give AORFBs greater commercial potential, as well as offering the safety advantages of water-based electrolytes. NAORFBs instead provide a much larger voltage window and occupy less space.

While AORFBs show great commercial potential, they also suffer from some issues like chemical stability of the organic active species (catholytes and anolytes). The chemical stability of these organic active species is affected by many factors like the pH. This is why, in recent years, the studies are focusing more on neutral AORFBs as they offer better chemical stability for the active species and hence, better capacity retention over many cycles. One key example of this would include the shift of focus from acidic and alkaline AORFBs to neutral for the case of Anthraquinone based AORFBs.

=== pH neutral AORFBs ===
pH neutral AORFBs are operated at pH 7 conditions, typically using NaCl as a supporting electrolyte. At pH neutral conditions, organic and organometallic molecules are more stable than at corrosive acidic and alkaline conditions. For example, K4[Fe(CN)6], a common catholyte used in AORFBs, is not stable in alkaline solutions but is at pH neutral conditions.

AORFBs used methyl viologen as an anolyte and 4-hydroxy-2,2,6,6-tetramethylpiperidin-1-oxyl as a catholyte at pH neutral conditions, plus NaCl and a low-cost anion exchange membrane. This MV/TEMPO system has the highest cell voltage, 1.25 V, and, possibly, lowest capital cost ($180/kWh) reported for AORFBs as of 2015. The aqueous liquid electrolytes were designed as a drop-in replacement without replacing infrastructure. A 600-milliwatt test battery was stable for 100 cycles with nearly 100 percent efficiency at current densities ranging from 20 to 100 mA/cm^{2}, with optimal performance rated at 40–50 mA, at which about 70 % of the battery's original voltage was retained. Neutral AORFBs can be more environmentally friendly than acid or alkaline alternatives, while showing electrochemical performance comparable to corrosive RFBs. The MV/TEMPO AORFB has an energy density of 8.4 Wh/L with the limitation on the TEMPO side. In 2019, Viologen-based flow batteries using an ultralight sulfonate–viologen/ferrocyanide AORFB were reported to be stable for 1000 cycles at an energy density of 10 Wh/L, the most stable, energy-dense AORFB to that date.

=== Acidic AORFBs ===
Quinones and their derivatives are the basis of many organic redox systems. In one study, 1,2-dihydrobenzoquinone-3,5-disulfonic acid (BQDS) and 1,4-dihydrobenzoquinone-2-sulfonic acid (BQS) were employed as cathodes, and conventional Pb/PbSO_{4} was the anolyte in a hybrid acid AORFB. Quinones accept two units of electrical charge, compared with one in conventional catholyte, implying twice as much energy in a given volume.

Another quinone 9,10-Anthraquinone-2,7-disulfonic acid (AQDS), was evaluated. AQDS undergoes rapid, reversible two-electron/two-proton reduction on a glassy carbon electrode in sulfuric acid. An aqueous flow battery with inexpensive carbon electrodes, combining the quinone/hydroquinone couple with the Br_{2}/Br^{−} redox couple, yields a peak galvanic power density exceeding 6,000 W/m^{2} at 13,000 A/m^{2}. Cycling showed > 99% storage capacity retention per cycle. Volumetric energy density was over 20 Wh/L. Anthraquinone-2-sulfonic acid and anthraquinone-2,6-disulfonic acid on the negative side and 1,2-dihydrobenzoquinone- 3,5-disulfonic acid on the positive side avoids the use of hazardous Br_{2}. The battery was claimed to last 1,000 cycles without degradation. It has a low cell voltage (ca. 0.55 V) and a low energy density (< 4 Wh/L).

Replacing hydrobromic acid with a less toxic alkaline solution (1 M KOH) and ferrocyanide was less corrosive, allowing the use of inexpensive polymer tanks. The increased electrical resistance in the membrane was compensated increased voltage to 1.2 V. Cell efficiency exceeded 99%, while round-trip efficiency measured 84%. The battery offered an expected lifetime of at least 1,000 cycles. Its theoretic energy density was 19 Wh/L. Ferrocyanide's chemical stability in high pH KOH solution was not verified.

Integrating both anolyte and catholyte in the same molecule, i.e., bifunctional analytes or combi-molecules allow the same material to be used in both tanks. In one tank it is an electron donor, while in the other it is an electron recipient. This has advantages such as diminishing crossover effects. Thus, quinone diaminoanthraquinone and indigo-based molecules as well as TEMPO/phenazine are potential electrolytes for such symmetric redox-flow batteries (SRFB).

Another approach adopted a Blatter radical as the donor/recipient. It endured 275 charge and discharge cycles in tests, although it was not water-soluble.

=== Alkaline ===
Quinone and fluorenone molecules can be reengineered to increase water solubility. In 2021 a reversible ketone (de)hydrogenation demonstration cell operated continuously for 120 days over 1,111 charging cycles at room temperature without a catalyst, retaining 97% percent capacity. The cell offered more than double the energy density of vanadium-based systems. The major challenge was the lack of a stable catholyte, holding energy densities below 5 Wh/L. Alkaline AORFBs use excess potassium ferrocyanide catholyte because of the stability issue of ferrocyanide in alkaline solutions.

Metal-organic flow batteries use organic ligands to improve redox properties. The ligands can be chelates such as EDTA, and can enable the electrolyte to be in neutral or alkaline conditions under which metal aquo complexes would otherwise precipitate. By blocking the coordination of water to the metal, organic ligands can inhibit metal-catalyzed water-splitting reactions, resulting in higher voltage aqueous systems. For example, the use of chromium coordinated to 1,3-propanediaminetetraacetate (PDTA), gave cell potentials of 1.62 V vs. ferrocyanide and a record 2.13 V vs. bromine. Metal-organic flow batteries may be known as coordination chemistry flow batteries, such as Lockheed Martin's Gridstar Flow technology.

=== Oligomer ===
Oligomer redox-species were proposed to reduce crossover, while allowing low-cost membranes. Such redox-active oligomers are known as redoxymers. One system uses organic polymers and a saline solution with a cellulose membrane. A prototype underwent 10,000 charging cycles while retaining substantial capacity. The energy density was 10 Wh/L. Current density reached, 1 amperes/cm^{2}.

Another oligomer RFB employed viologen and TEMPO redoxymers in combination with low-cost dialysis membranes. Functionalized macromolecules (similar to acrylic glass or styrofoam) dissolved in water were the active electrode material. The size-selective nanoporous membrane worked like a strainer and is produced much more easily and at lower cost than conventional ion-selective membranes. It block the big "spaghetti"-like polymer molecules, while allowing small counterions to pass. The concept may solve the high cost of traditional Nafion membrane. RFBs with oligomer redox-species have not demonstrated competitive area-specific power. Low operating current density may be an intrinsic feature of large redox-molecules.

== Other types ==
Other flow-type batteries include the zinc–cerium battery, the zinc–bromine battery, and the hydrogen–bromine battery.

=== Membraneless ===
A membraneless battery relies on laminar flow in which two liquids are pumped through a channel, where they undergo electrochemical reactions to store or release energy. The solutions pass in parallel, with little mixing. The flow naturally separates the liquids, without requiring a membrane.

Membranes are often the most costly and least reliable battery components, as they are subject to corrosion by repeated exposure to certain reactants. The absence of a membrane enables the use of a liquid bromine solution and hydrogen: this combination is problematic when membranes are used, because they form hydrobromic acid that can destroy the membrane. Both materials are available at low cost. The design uses a small channel between two electrodes. Liquid bromine flows through the channel over a graphite cathode and hydrobromic acid flows under a porous anode. At the same time, hydrogen gas flows across the anode. The chemical reaction can be reversed to recharge the battery – a first for a membraneless design. One such membraneless flow battery announced in August 2013 produced a maximum power density of 0.795 W/cm^{2}, three times more than other membraneless systems—and an order of magnitude higher than lithium-ion batteries.

In 2018, a macroscale membraneless RFB capable of recharging and recirculation of the electrolyte streams was demonstrated. The battery was based on immiscible organic catholyte and aqueous anolyte liquids, which exhibited high capacity retention and Coulombic efficiency during cycling.

=== Suspension-based ===
A lithium–sulfur system arranged in a network of nanoparticles eliminates the requirement that charge moves in and out of particles that are in direct contact with a conducting plate. Instead, the nanoparticle network allows electricity to flow throughout the liquid. This allows more energy to be extracted.

In a semi-solid flow battery, positive and negative electrode particles are suspended in a carrier liquid. The suspensions are flow through a stack of reaction chambers, separated by a barrier such as a thin, porous membrane. The approach combines the basic structure of aqueous-flow batteries, which use electrode material suspended in a liquid electrolyte, with the chemistry of lithium-ion batteries in both carbon-free suspensions and slurries with a conductive carbon network. The carbon-free semi-solid RFB is also referred to as solid dispersion redox flow batteries. Dissolving a material changes its chemical behavior significantly. However, suspending bits of solid material preserves the solid's characteristics. The result is a viscous suspension.

In 2022, Influit Energy announced a flow battery electrolyte consisting of a metal oxide suspended in an aqueous solution.

Flow batteries with redox-targeted solids (ROTS), also known as solid energy boosters (SEBs) either the posolyte or negolyte or both (a.k.a. redox fluids), come in contact with one or more solid electroactive materials (SEM). The fluids comprise one or more redox couples, with redox potentials flanking the redox potential of the SEM. Such SEB/RFBs combine the high specific energy advantage of conventional batteries (such as lithium-ion) with the decoupled energy-power advantage of flow batteries. SEB(ROTS) RFBs have advantages compared to semi-solid RFBs, such as no need to pump viscous slurries, no precipitation/clogging, higher area-specific power, longer durability, and wider chemical design space. However, because of double energy losses (one in the stack and another in the tank between the SEB(ROTS) and a mediator), such batteries suffer from poor energy efficiency. On a system-level, the practical specific energy of traditional lithium-ion batteries is larger than that of SEB(ROTS)-flow versions of lithium-ion batteries.

== Comparison ==
Comparison of flow battery compositions
Couple	Max. cell voltage (V)	Average electrode power density (W/m^{2})	Average fluid energy density	Cycles
Hydrogen–lithium bromate	1.1	15,000	750 Wh/kg	
Hydrogen–lithium chlorate	1.4	10,000	1400 Wh/kg	
Bromine–hydrogen	1.07	7,950		
Iron–tin	0.62	< 200		
Iron–titanium	0.43	< 200		
Iron–chromium	1.07	< 200		
Iron–iron	1.21	< 1000	20 Wh/L	10,000
Organic (2013)	0.8	13,000	21.4 Wh/L	10
Organic (2015)	1.2		7.1 Wh/L	100
MV-TEMPO	1.25		8.4 Wh/L	100
Sulfonate viologen (NH4)4[Fe(CN)6]	0.9	> 500	10 Wh/L	1,000
Metal-organic–ferrocyanide	1.62	2,000	21.7 Wh/L	75
Metal-organic–bromine	2.13	3,000	35 Wh/L	10
Vanadium–vanadium (sulphate)	1.4	~800	25 Wh/L	
Vanadium–vanadium (bromide)			50 Wh/L	2,000
Sodium–bromine polysulfide	1.54	~800		
Sodium–potassium				
Sulfur–oxygen-salt				
Zinc–bromine	1.85	~1,000	75 Wh/kg	> 2,000
Lead–acid (methanesulfonate)	1.82	~1,000		
Zinc–cerium (methanesulfonate)	2.43	< 1,200–2,500		
Zn-Mn(VI)/Mn(VII)	1.2		60 Wh/L	

== Applications ==
Technical merits make redox flow batteries well-suited for large-scale energy storage. Flow batteries are normally considered for relatively large (1 kWh – 10 MWh) stationary applications with multi-hour charge-discharge cycles. Flow batteries are not cost-efficient for shorter charge/discharge times. Market niches include:

- Grid storage: short and/or long-term energy storage for use by the grid
  - Load balancing: the battery is attached to the grid to store power during off-peak hours and release it during peak demand periods. The common problem limiting this use of most flow battery chemistries is their low areal power (operating current density) which translates into high cost.
  - Shifting energy from intermittent sources such as wind or solar for use during periods of peak demand.
  - Peak shaving, where demand spikes are met by the battery.
- Uninterruptible power supplies, where the battery is used if the main power is interrupted.
- Power conversion: Because all cells share the same electrolyte(s), the electrolytes may be charged using a given number of cells and discharged with a different number. As battery voltage is proportional to the number of cells used, the battery can act as a powerful DC–DC converter. In addition, if the number of cells is continuously changed (on the input and/or output side) power conversion can also be AC/DC, AC/AC, or DC–AC with the frequency limited by that of the switching gear.
- Electric vehicles: Because flow batteries can be rapidly "recharged" by replacing the electrolyte, they can be used for applications where the vehicle needs to take on energy as fast as a gas vehicle. A common problem with most RFB chemistries in EV applications is their low energy density which translated into a short driving range. Zinc-chlorine batteries and batteries with highly soluble halates are a notable exception.
- Stand-alone power system: An example of this is in cellphone base stations where no grid power is available. The battery can be used alongside solar or wind power sources to compensate for their fluctuating power levels and alongside a generator to save fuel.

== See also ==
- Glossary of fuel cell terms
- Hydrogen technologies
- List of battery types
- Microtubular membrane
- Redox electrode
