= Dispersed particle resistance =

Dispersed particle resistance (DPR) is a measured parameter to characterize battery active materials. It is seen as an indicator of lithium-ion battery active material rate capability. It is the slope of voltage-current linear fit for active material samples in suspensions. It can be obtained by applying different voltages on a suspension and measuring the currents, after which the data points are plotted. The slope of the plot is referred to as dispersed particle resistance. It can also be done in the opposite way where different currents are applied and voltages are measured. The key advantage of this dispersed particle resistance technique is fast and accurate comparing with the conventional characterization method for which batteries need to be fabricated and tested for a long time.
