= Zinc–bromine battery =

Type of electrochemical cell

- Specific energy: 60–85 W·h/kg
- Energy density: 15–65 W·h/L (56–230 kJ/L)
- Charge/discharge efficiency: 75.9%
- Energy/consumer-price: US$400/kW·h (US$0.11/kJ)
- Cycle durability: >6,000 cycles
- Nominal cell voltage: 1.8 V

A zinc-bromine battery is a rechargeable battery system that uses the reaction between zinc metal and bromine to produce electric current, with an electrolyte composed of an aqueous solution of zinc bromide. Zinc has long been used as the negative electrode of primary cells. It is a widely available, relatively inexpensive metal. It is rather stable in contact with neutral and alkaline aqueous solutions. For this reason, it is used today in zinc–carbon and alkaline primaries.

The leading potential application is stationary energy storage, either for the grid, or for domestic or stand-alone power systems. The aqueous electrolyte makes the system less prone to overheating and fire compared with lithium-ion battery systems.

== Overview ==
Zinc–bromine batteries can be split into two groups: flow batteries and non-flow batteries.

There are no longer any companies commercializing flow batteries, Gelion (Australia) have non-flow technology that they are developing and EOS Energy Enterprises (US) are commercializing their non-flow system.

== Features ==
Zinc–bromine batteries share six advantages over lithium-ion storage systems:

- 100% depth of discharge capability on a daily basis.
- Little capacity degradation, enabling 5000+ cycles
- Low fire risk, since the electrolytes are non-flammable
- No need for cooling systems
- Low-cost and readily available battery materials
- Easy end-of-life recycling using existing processes

They share four disadvantages:

- Lower energy density
- Lower round-trip efficiency (partially offset by the energy needed to run cooling systems).
- The need to be fully discharged every few days to prevent zinc dendrites, which can puncture the separator.
- Lower charge and discharge rates

These features make zinc-bromine batteries unsuitable for many mobile applications (that typically require high charge/discharge rates and low weight), but suitable for stationary energy storage applications such as daily cycling to support solar power generation, off-grid systems, and load shifting.

== Types ==
=== Flow ===
The zinc–bromine flow battery (ZBRFB) is a hybrid flow battery. A solution of zinc bromide is stored in two tanks. When the battery is charged or discharged, the solutions (electrolytes) are pumped through a reactor stack from one tank to the other. One tank is used to store the electrolyte for positive electrode reactions, and the other stores the negative. Energy densities range between 60 and 85 W·h/kg.

The aqueous electrolyte is composed of zinc bromide salt dissolved in water. During charge, metallic zinc is plated from the electrolyte solution onto the negative electrode (carbon felt in older designs, titanium mesh in modern) surfaces in the cell stacks. Bromide is converted to bromine at the positive electrode surface and stored in a safe, chemically complexed organic phase. Older ZBRFB cells used polymer membranes (microporous polymers, Nafion, etc.) More recent designs eliminate the membrane. The battery stack is typically made of carbon-filled plastic bipolar plates (e.g. 60 cells), and is enclosed into a high-density polyethylene (HDPE) container. The battery can be regarded as an electroplating machine. During charging, zinc is electroplated onto conductive electrodes, while bromine is formed. On discharge, the process reverses: the metallic zinc plated on the negative electrodes dissolves in the electrolyte and is available to be plated again at the next charge cycle. It can be left fully discharged indefinitely. Self-discharge does not occur in a fully charged state when the stack is kept dry.

==== Features ====
Zinc–bromine flow batteries do not enjoy the advantage of scale that other flow-battery technologies enjoy. Storage capacity cannot be increased by simply adding additional electrolyte tanks (the stack must also be scaled up).

Zinc-bromine hybrid-flow batteries have many specific disadvantages:

- Reset: Every 1–4 cycles the terminals must be shorted across a low-impedance shunt while running the electrolyte pump, to fully remove zinc from battery plates.
- Low areal power: (<0.2 W/cm^{2}) during both charge and discharge, which increases the cost of power.
- Low Round Trip Efficiency: <70% on an RTE basis, significantly lower than Li-ion batteries, which typically reach 90% or more.
- Low energy-density:
- Complex construction with moving parts
- Poor reliability: no manufacturer has yet to produce a reliable Zn-Br flow battery

==== Design ====
The two electrode chambers of each cell are typically divided by a membrane (typically a microporous or ion-exchange variety). This helps to prevent bromine from reaching the negative electrode, where it would react with the zinc, causing self-discharge. To further reduce self-discharge and to reduce bromine vapor pressure, complexing agents are added to the positive electrolyte. These react reversibly with the bromine to form an oily red liquid and reduce the Br_{2} concentration in the electrolyte.

==== Developers (all now defunct) ====
- Primus Power – Hayward, California, is a privately held US company. However, as at May 2023, they had had no installations since 2015. Primus Power claim 70% efficiency for their 125 kWh unit. Although the Primus Power website is still live, the company is not operating.
- RedFlow Limited – went into voluntary administration on the 23rd of August, 2024, and was liquidated in December 2024. Their ZBM3 battery which had an energy density of 42 Wh/kg claimed to supply 12 hours of continuous power, with a "stack energy efficiency" of up to 80%, suffered from poor reliability and supply chain issues. Redflow were unable to get the high quality parts they needed to iron out manufacturing issues due to low order volumes.
- EnSync (Formerly ZBB) – Menomonee Falls, Wisconsin, US (defunct).

=== Non-flow ===
Non-flow batteries do not pass battery materials between two tanks.

==== Developers ====
- Gelion: Thomas Maschmeyer at the University of Sydney replaced the liquid with a gel. Ions can move more quickly, decreasing charging time. The gel is fire-retardant. In April 2016 Gelion, launched. The company earned an A$11 million investment from UK renewables group Armstrong Energy. Gelion raised further capital with an IPO and listed on the AIM London Stock Exchange 30 November 2021. However, Gelion is now focussed on its Li-S-Si battery technology and doesn't appear to be investing in its Zn-Br technology.
- EOS Energy Enterprise cathode: As of May 2023 EOS had announced its Eos Z3 battery and claimed an order backlog of 347MWh and a total 2.2GWh of binding orders. EOS claimed its battery has an RTE "in the mid 80s" (with reduced depth of discharge) and a lifetime of 6,000 cycles/20 years.
- A 2026 industry overview by Enki describes Eos Energy's battery systems as non-flammable, zinc-based aqueous batteries intended for medium-to-long-duration grid storage.

== Electrochemistry ==
Flow and non-flow configuration share the same electrochemistry.

At the negative electrode zinc is the electroactive species. It is electropositive, with a standard reduction potential E° = −0.76 V vs SHE.

The negative electrode reaction is the reversible dissolution/plating of zinc:

$$\ce{Zn_{(s)} <=> {Zn^2+}_{(aq)} + 2e^-}$$

At the positive electrode bromine is reversibly reduced to bromide (with a standard reduction potential of +1.087 V vs SHE):

$$\ce{{Br2_{(aq)}} + 2e^- <=> {2Br^-}_{(aq)}}$$

So the overall cell reaction is

$$\ce{{Zn_{(s)}} + Br2_{(aq)} <=> {2Br^-}_{(aq)} + {Zn^2+}_{(aq)}}$$

The measured potential difference is around 1.67 V per cell (slightly less than that predicted from standard reduction potentials).

== Applications ==
Zinc-bromine batteries have practical applications in grid energy storage and backup power for remote locations such as phone towers and microwave internet relays

Significant diesel-generator fuel savings are possible at remote telecom sites operating under conditions of low electrical load and large installed generation by using multiple systems in parallel to maximise the benefits and minimise the drawbacks of the technology.

== History ==
Many Zn-Br flow battery tech companies have gone bankrupt. EOS Energy and Gelion are the only two that remain trading, both have non-flow Zn-Br technology.

In December 2021 Redflow completed a 2 MWh installation for Aneargia to support a 2.0 MW biogas-fuelled cogeneration unit, and a microgrid control system in California.

As of November 2021 EOS Energy Enterprises had secured a 300 MWh order from Pine Gate Renewables, with installation planned for 2022.

As of February 2022, Gelion announced an agreement with Acciona Energy to trial Endure batteries for grid-scale applications.

== See also ==
- Electrochemical engineering
- List of battery types
