= Vauxhall Ellesmere Port =

Motor vehicle assembly plant in England

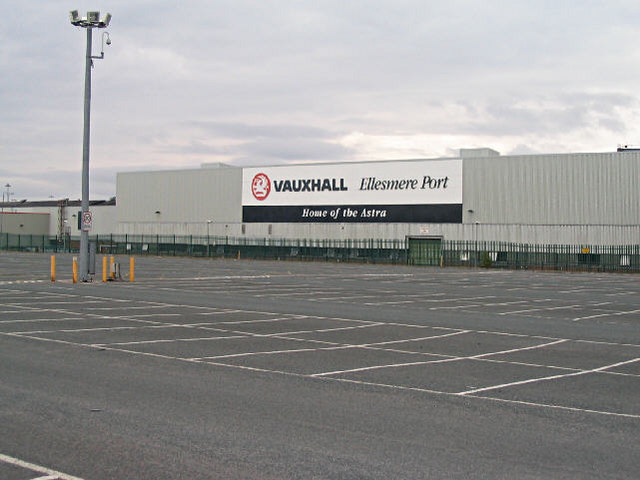
- Built: 1962
- Location: North Rd, Ellesmere Port CH65 1AL; Ellesmere Port, Cheshire, England
- Coordinates: 53°18′11.9″N 2°55′55.3″W
- Industry: Motor vehicle manufacture
- Products: Vauxhall Viva (1962–1974); Opel/Vauxhall Chevette (1975–1984); Opel/Vauxhall Astra (1981–2022)
- Employees: 1,100
- Area: 1,209,366 m^{2} (13,017,510 sq ft)
- Volume: 187,000 vehicles
- Owners: General Motors (1962–2017); Groupe PSA (2017–2021); Stellantis (2021–present)

Vauxhall Ellesmere Port is a motor vehicle assembly plant, located in the town of Ellesmere Port, in Cheshire West & Chester, United Kingdom. It has always built small/medium Vauxhall/Opel vehicles, including the Vauxhall Viva and Opel/Vauxhall Astra. It is owned by the global car manufacturer Stellantis.

== Background ==
In 1070, William the Conqueror granted the lands of Hooton adjoining the River Mersey to Adam de Aldithly. Eventually they passed to the Stanley family through a series of marriages. After the Battle of Bosworth, Hooton had a new hall and the first Lord Derby in Lancashire. A second half-timbered hall was built in 1488.

A third Italian-style hall was constructed circa 1778, but this later sold to cover the Stanley family's gambling debts in 1850. The hall was bought by a Mr. Naylor, a wealthy Liverpool banker, for 82,000 guineas.

=== RAF Hooton Park ===
British participation in World War I was declared on 4 August 1914. The British War Department requisitioned the estate for use as an army training ground.

Allocating the site to the Royal Flying Corps as a training aerodrome for pilots, the War Department built one single and three double aircraft hangars, which were completed in 1917.

The airfield closed in 1957 after the disbandment of the Royal Auxiliary Air Force, with the site sold to Vauxhall Motors.

== History ==
The former RAF site was bought by General Motors-owned Vauxhall Motors, who developed their plant as a sub-assembly and engine production centre to supply their existing Dunstable and Luton factories. The location was chosen in part to the then government policy of relocating industry to areas of higher unemployment, of which the Merseyside region was one, and this being a large, flat site within the vicinity suitable for a factory of significant size. The first plant director, American Tom Williams, was already familiar with the site from his days as a World War II pilot in the US Air Force. The first components flowed off the production line in November 1962.

However, the site was quickly developed as the small-car production centre, with the first Vauxhall Viva rolling off of the new assembly line in June 1964. What became known locally as the North Road factory has been responsible since for building all of the successive models, including from 1975 all variants of the Vauxhall Chevette. Employment at the plant peaked that year, at 12,000.

In 1980, the plant exported the first Opel badged cars from the UK, with 2,000 Ellesmere Port-built Chevettes exported for sale in West Germany through the Opel dealer network. After the launch of the Vauxhall Astra in 1981, a further £65M investment in 1984 allowed commencement of the second generation Astra. After the consolidation of the European management, design functions and vehicle models in 1986 of the Opel and Vauxhall companies under parent company General Motors Europe, over half of the production output of the plant has been exported.

For much of its existence thereon within the Opel/Vauxhall production network, Ellesmere Port was the sister facility to Opel's Bochum plant in Germany; from the 1973 Opel Kadett C onward, the two factories were the lead plants for the Kadett/Astra platform through the last six model generations. Following Bochum's closure in 2014, Ellesmere Port became the sole lead plant for the Astra K, which was released in 2016.

In 1996, it was the first car plant in the world to be certified for its environmental management systems.

=== 2000s to present ===
There had been fears that the plant could close in 2014, as the new Astra model came into production in 2015. However, compared to its sister site in Bochum, Ellesmere Port in 2012 was reported to be producing 47 cars an hour over two shifts a day (a company record), while Bochum was producing 30 cars an hour over three shifts a day. In May 2012 the announcement was made that as a result of its commitment to new operating practices Ellesmere Port had been awarded the mandate to produce the new Astra from 2015 alongside Opel's Gliwice plant in Poland, securing the existing 2,100 jobs with a possibility of adding a further 700 jobs to allow for a 51-week/3-shift production pattern. The awarding of the Astra project carried an obligation to improve operator performance (to the same level as Gliwice's 'ILO 100' workrate) which would close the overall productivity gap to Opel's Bochum plant. Although Bochum had superior productivity, Ellesmere Port's labour costs were around 20% lower than Bochum. This fact, along with GM Europe's desire to have a hedge for the Euro against the British pound, resulted in Ellesmere Port securing another five years for the future of the plant. Like most automotive plants in Europe, the future for Ellesmere Port remained uncertain as substantial overcapacity and uncompetitive structural costs remain a threat to Opel/Vauxhall as the company searched for new ownership of its entire European operations. In 2017 the European operations of General Motors were sold to Groupe PSA.

In 2018, PSA cut several hundred jobs at the factory amid uncertainty about the future viability of production after Brexit. On 23 November 2018, a strike was held at the plant by all union workers in protest at ongoing job losses.

By 2019, the plant employed about 1,100 people, still producing the current model Opel/Vauxhall Astra.

PSA's intention was that Ellesmere Port would be one of two factories to build the new Astra in 2021; the Rüsselsheim plant in Germany would also build Opel Astras from 2021. PSA would pull production from the Ellesmere Port plant if Brexit renders the plant unprofitable. It was reported that PSA would build the Astra estate, which represents the bulk of Ellesmere Port production, in Rüsselsheim from 2022 as 95% of Astra estates were sold on the European continent. According to PSA, allocation of vehicle to Ellesmere Port would be contingent on the terms of the future trading relationship between the UK and the EU, and ensuring that it is a profitable investment.

In January 2021 Groupe PSA became part of Stellantis, which also incorporates brands from the former Fiat Chrysler Automobiles.

=== Electric era ===
Production of the Astra stopped in April 2022. The factory was retooled to produce the Vauxhall Combo-e, Citroën e-Berlingo, Peugeot e-Partner and FIAT E-Doblò electric vans in 2023. Their passenger car equivalents will start production on site in 2024.

== Vehicles built at Ellesmere Port ==
- Vauxhall Viva (1963–1979)
- Vauxhall Chevette/Chevette (sold by Opel with no brand) (1975–1984)
- Opel Kadett/Vauxhall Astra (1981–1991)
- Opel Kadett Combo/Bedford Astramax/Vauxhall Astramax (1986–1989)
- Opel/Vauxhall Astra (1991–2022)
- Opel/Vauxhall Combo (2023–)
- Citroën e-Berlingo (2023–)
- Peugeot Rifter (2023–)
- Peugeot Partner (2023–)
- Fiat e-Doblò

== Football club ==
Vauxhall Motors F.C. was founded in 1963, shortly after the opening of the new plant. Early in its history, it played in the Ellesmere Port League and the Wirral Combination, but it soon grew too strong for those leagues. By 1970, the club had achieved several promotions and played on the company-owned Hooton Park. In 1987 it opened its own ground at Rivacre Park, opened by then England manager Bobby Robson, where the club plays today.

== See also ==
- Opel Eisenach
- IBC Vehicles
