= Citroën e-Berlingo =

Motor vehicle

Citroën ë-Berlingo
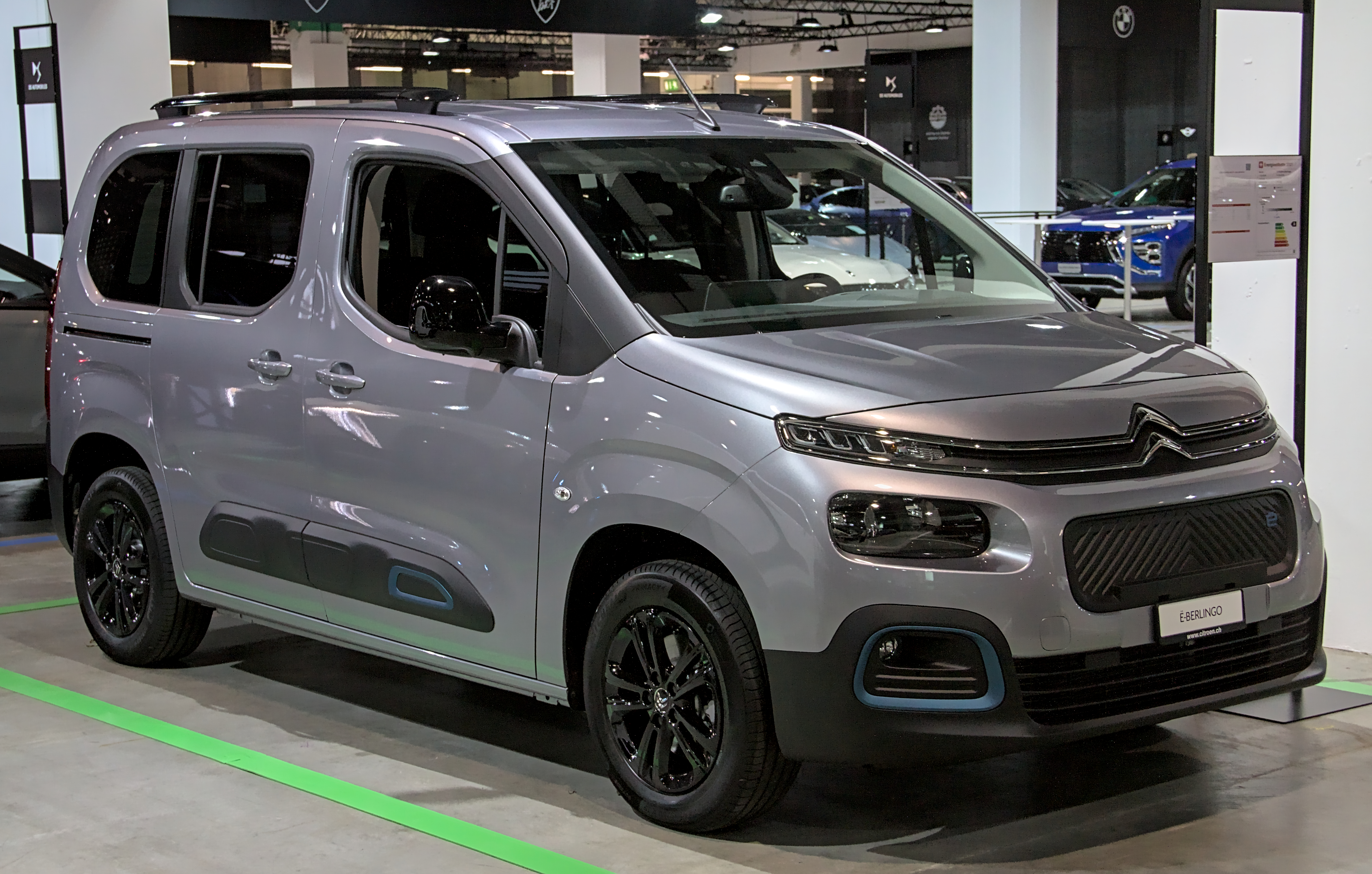
- Citroën ë-Berlingo (Zurich 2021)

Overview
- Manufacturer: Citroën
- Also called: Berlingo Electric

Body and chassis
- Related: Fiat e-Doblo (2022+); Opel / Vauxhall Combo-e; Peugeot e-Partner / e-Rifter; Toyota ProAce City Electric & City Verso Electric

Chronology
- Predecessor: Berlingo électrique

The Citroën ë-Berlingo is a battery-electric version of the Berlingo range of car-based light commercial vehicle (LCV) and multi purpose vehicles (MPV) manufactured and sold by Citroën. Rebadged versions are sold by other marques within Stellantis as the Peugeot e-Partner, Opel/Vauxhall Combo-e, and Fiat E-Doblò; in addition, Toyota sells a rebadged version as the Toyota ProAce City Electric.

The Berlingo range were first introduced in 1996, and a battery-electric version followed in 1998 as the Citroën Berlingo électrique, which was sold until 2005. Another electric LCV variant of the first generation was delivered to La Poste in 2010 as the Berlingo First Electric, built in partnership with Venturi Automobiles but not sold commercially. The second-generation Berlingo was introduced in 2008 and an electric LCV version was shown in 2012 as the Berlingo Electric, developed in partnership with Mitsubishi Motors, followed by the E-Berlingo Multispace as a 5-passenger MPV in 2017. The third-generation Berlingo was introduced in 2018 and the electric versions, developed within Stellantis, were introduced in 2021, led by the ë-Berlingo.

== History ==
=== First generation ===
==== Berlingo électrique ====
The Berlingo électrique was sold from 1998 to 2005. It was equipped with an electric traction motor with a nominal and maximum output of 15.5 and 28 kW (20.8 and 37.5 hp), respectively. Energy was stored in a 162 V NiCd battery.

==== Powered by Venturi ====
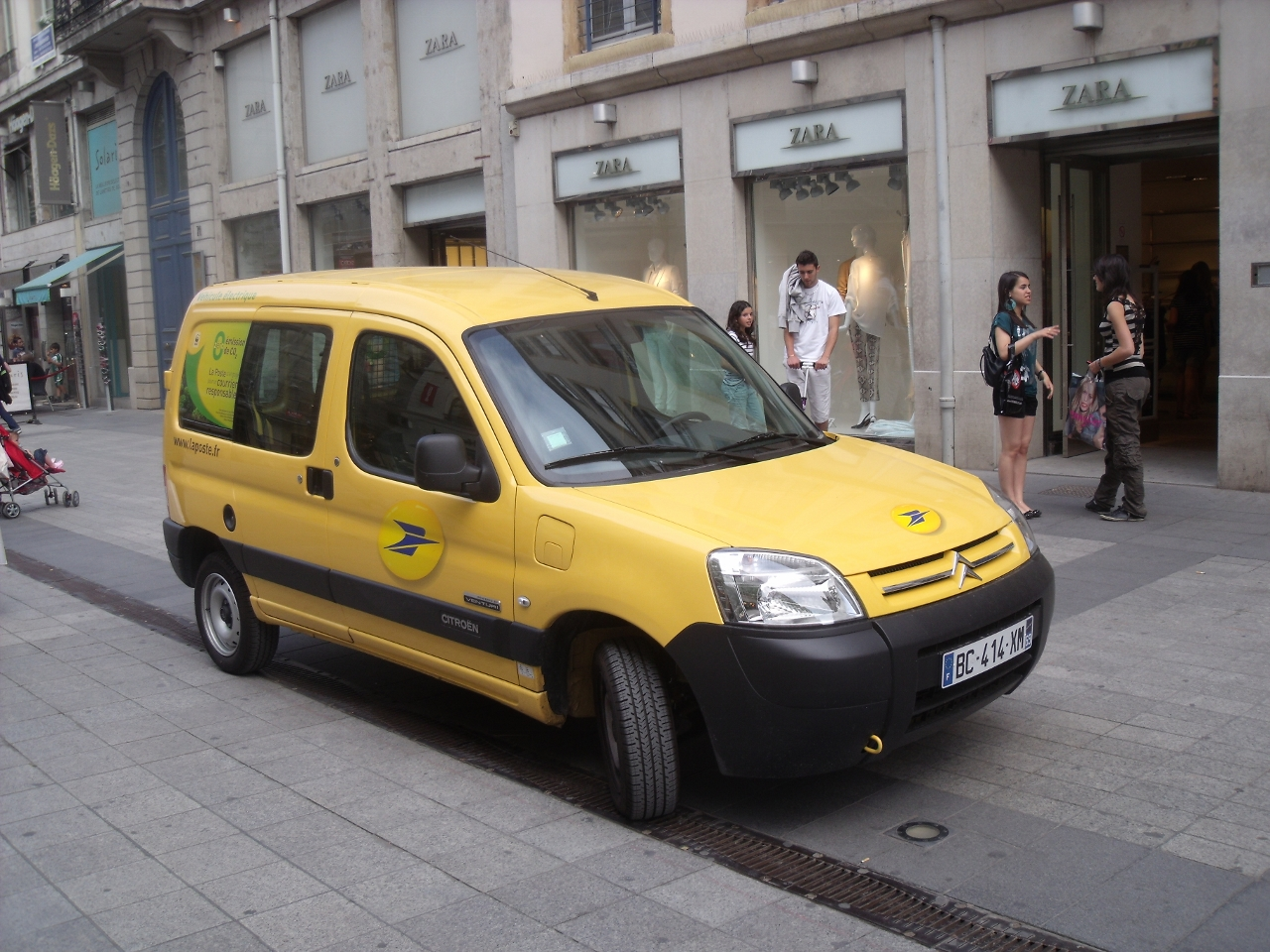
Citroën/Venturi Berlingo First Electric for La Poste

Venturi Automobiles partnered with PSA Group to develop electric vehicles in response to a 2007 tender by the French postal service La Poste. Prototypes, based on the production Citroën Berlingo First and Peugeot Partner Origin light commercial vans, were built and tested in 2008. La Poste awarded the contract to PSA Group in 2009 and 250 examples of the Berlingo First Electric "Powered by Venturi" were delivered in 2010. Venturi developed the battery-electric drive train. It was also rebadged as a Peugeot Partner Origin "Powered by Venturi".

The La Poste PSA/Venturi Berlingo First Electric vans had a three-phase traction motor with a maximum output of 42 kW (56 hp) and an estimated range of 100–120 km (62–75 mi). The drivetrain components (motor and battery) fit into the front compartment, giving the PSA/Venturi Berlingo Electric the same cargo volume as the conventional Berlingo. The "Zebra" molten-salt battery (NaNiCl_{2}) weighed 201 kg (443 lb) and had a storage capacity of 23.5 kW-hr; although it was relatively compact and inexpensive, the high operating temperature of the molten-salt battery meant the user had "the obligation to plug in [their] car whenever [they] can." The onboard charger had a maximum power input capacity of 3.2 kW. Total curb weight was 1,325 kg (2,921 lb).

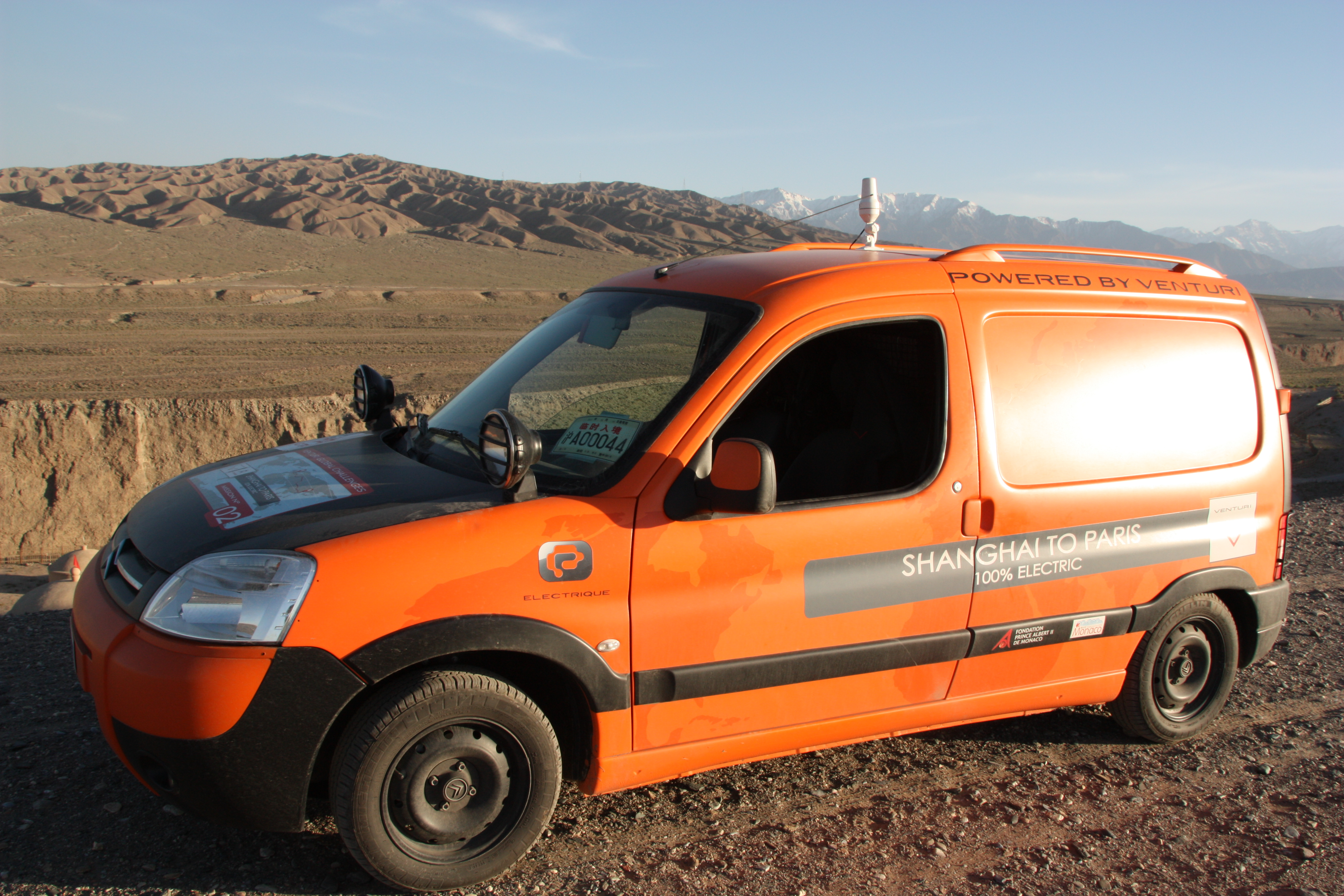
PSA/Venturi Berlingo First Electric, Shanghai to Paris

To demonstrate its technologies, a specially-prepared Berlingo "Powered by Venturi" was driven from Shanghai to Paris by Xavier Chevrin and Géraldine Gabin between 3 May and 13 July 2010, covering a distance of 14,900 km (9,300 mi) without assistance. The Shanghai–Paris Berlingo was equipped with three "Zebra" batteries, giving a total energy storage capacity of 70.5 kW-hr; the traction motor had an output of 46 kW (62 hp) and 180 N⋅m (130 lbf⋅ft), providing a range of up to 400 km (250 mi). Chevrin followed that feat by driving a similar electric Berlingo 5,800 km (3,600 mi) in May 2012 from Kilimanjaro to Okavango; the Kilimanjaro–Okavango Berlingo also carried three "Zebra" batteries.

=== Second generation ===
==== Berlingo Electric ====
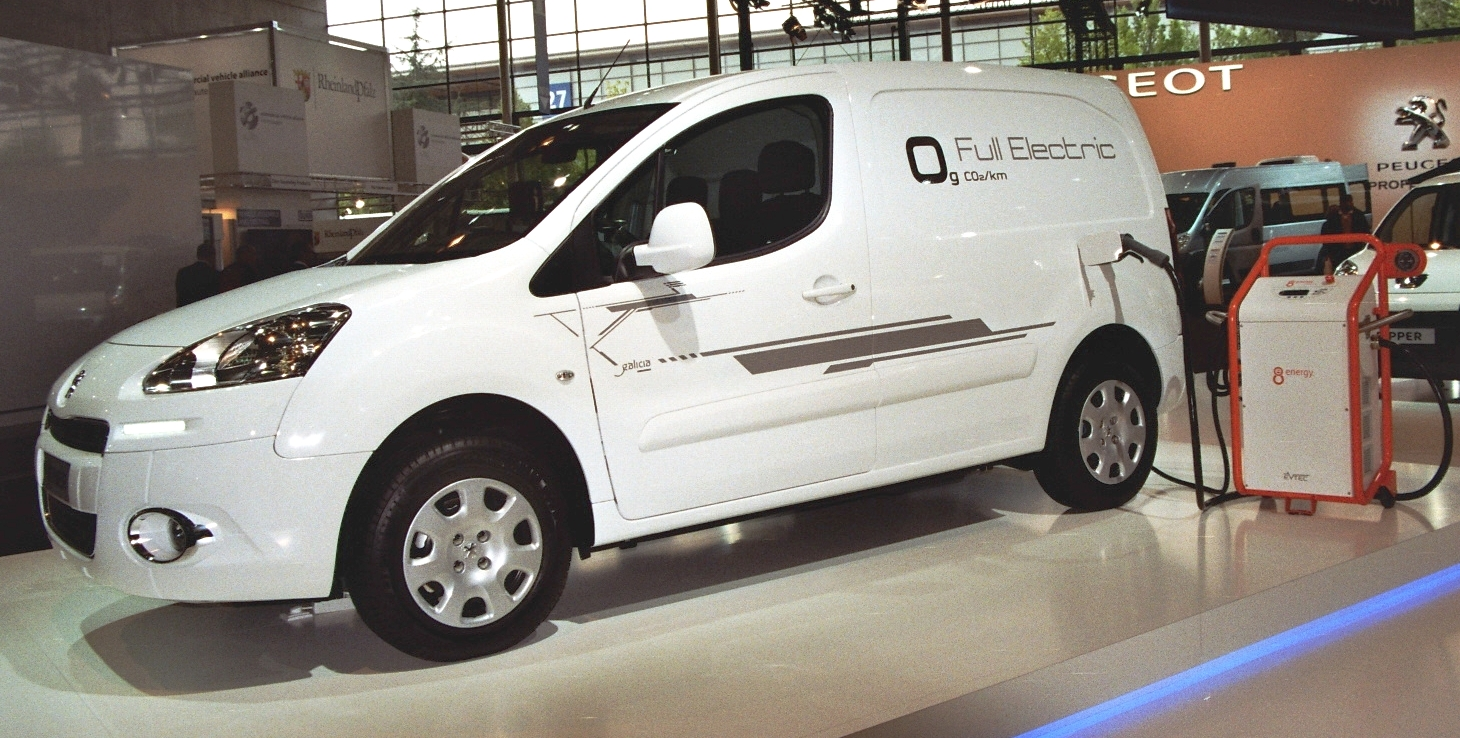
Peugeot Partner Electric at IAA 2012

In 2010, PSA and Mitsubishi announced they were jointly developing LCV EVs. An all-new Citroën Berlingo Electric light commercial panel van was shown at the Hanover Motor Show in September 2012. At the same time, PSA Group sibling Peugeot unveiled a rebadged version as the Peugeot Partner Electric. Citroën and Peugeot had been selling rebadged versions of the battery-electric Mitsubishi i-MiEV as the C-Zero and iOn, respectively; the drivetrain of the Berlingo / Partner Electric was similar to the i-MiEV.

The Berlingo / Partner Electric were equipped with a permanent magnet synchronous electric traction motor that developed a peak output of 49 kW (66 hp) and 200 N⋅m (150 lbf⋅ft) of torque, drawing from a 22.5 kW-hr lithium-ion battery carried under the vehicle floor, maximizing passenger and cargo space. Total estimated driving range was 106 mi (171 km) under the New European Driving Cycle. Top speed is 110 km/h (68 mph). They are equipped with two vehicle inlets for charging: a CHAdeMO DC fast-charging port above one rear wheel, replacing the fuel filler port, and a Type 2 connector above one front wheel. As initially released, the vans had a load floor length of 1,800 mm (71 in) and cargo volume of 3.3 m^{3} (120 cu ft). The Berlingo / Partner Electric were the first battery-electric light commercial vehicles marketed by PSA Group since the first-generation-based Berlingo électrique had been discontinued in 2005. They were released in the United Kingdom in April 2013.

In 2016 worldwide sales were 491, with just 19 sold in the UK.

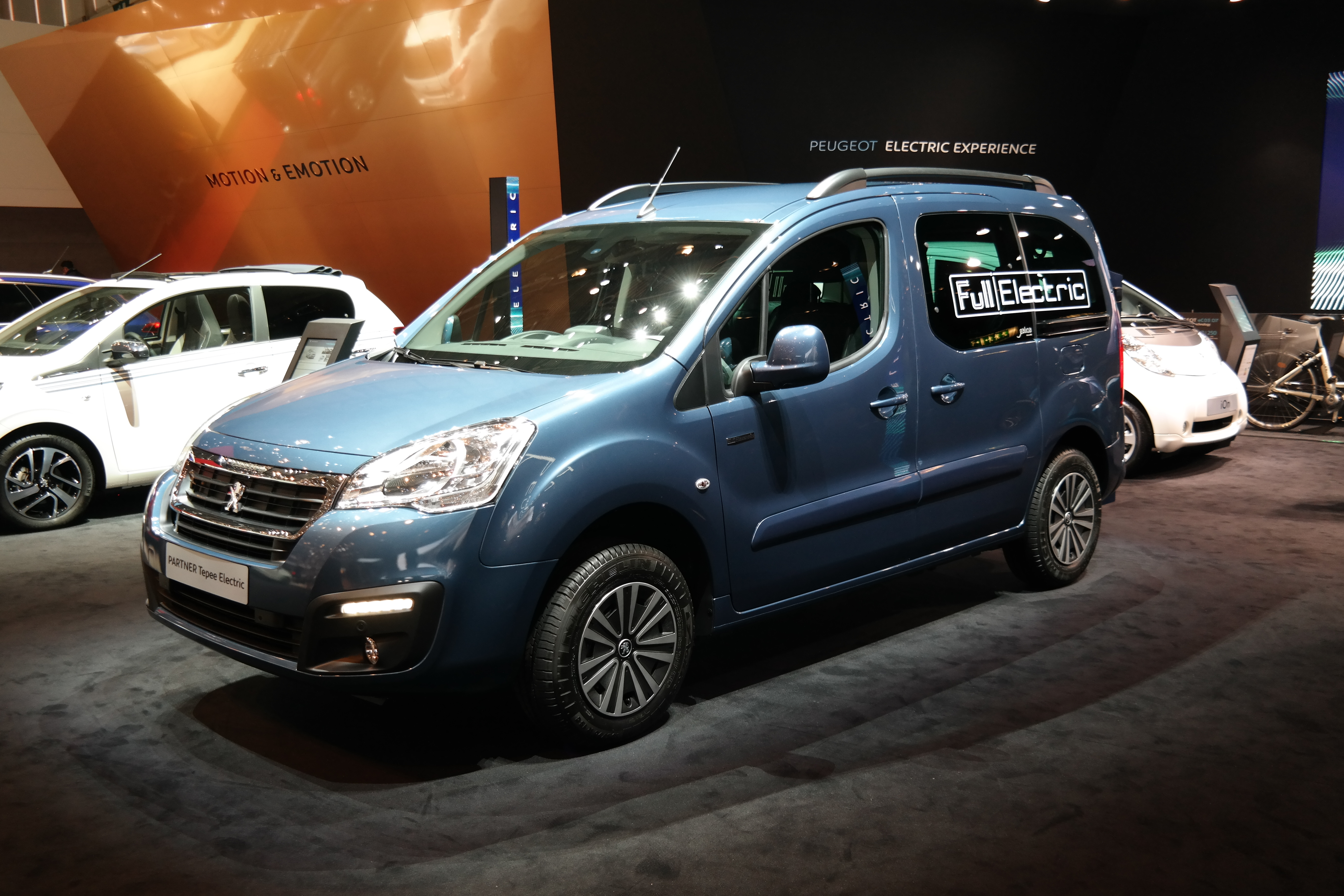
Peugeot Partner Tepee Electric at Geneva 2017

The range was expanded in 2017 with a Berlingo Electric L2 550 LX van which extends the load length by 250 mm (9.8 in) to 2,050 mm (81 in), expanding cargo volume to 3.7 m^{3} (130 cu ft). Also in 2017, an electric version of the Berlingo Multispace multi purpose vehicle (MPV) was announced, which transplanted the EV drivetrain from the Berlingo Electric panel van to the MPV, gaining a second row of seats for passengers and windows all around; the prototype MPV was named the Citroën E-Berlingo. A rebadged version of the electric MPV was available as the Peugeot Partner Tepee Electric.

=== Third generation ===
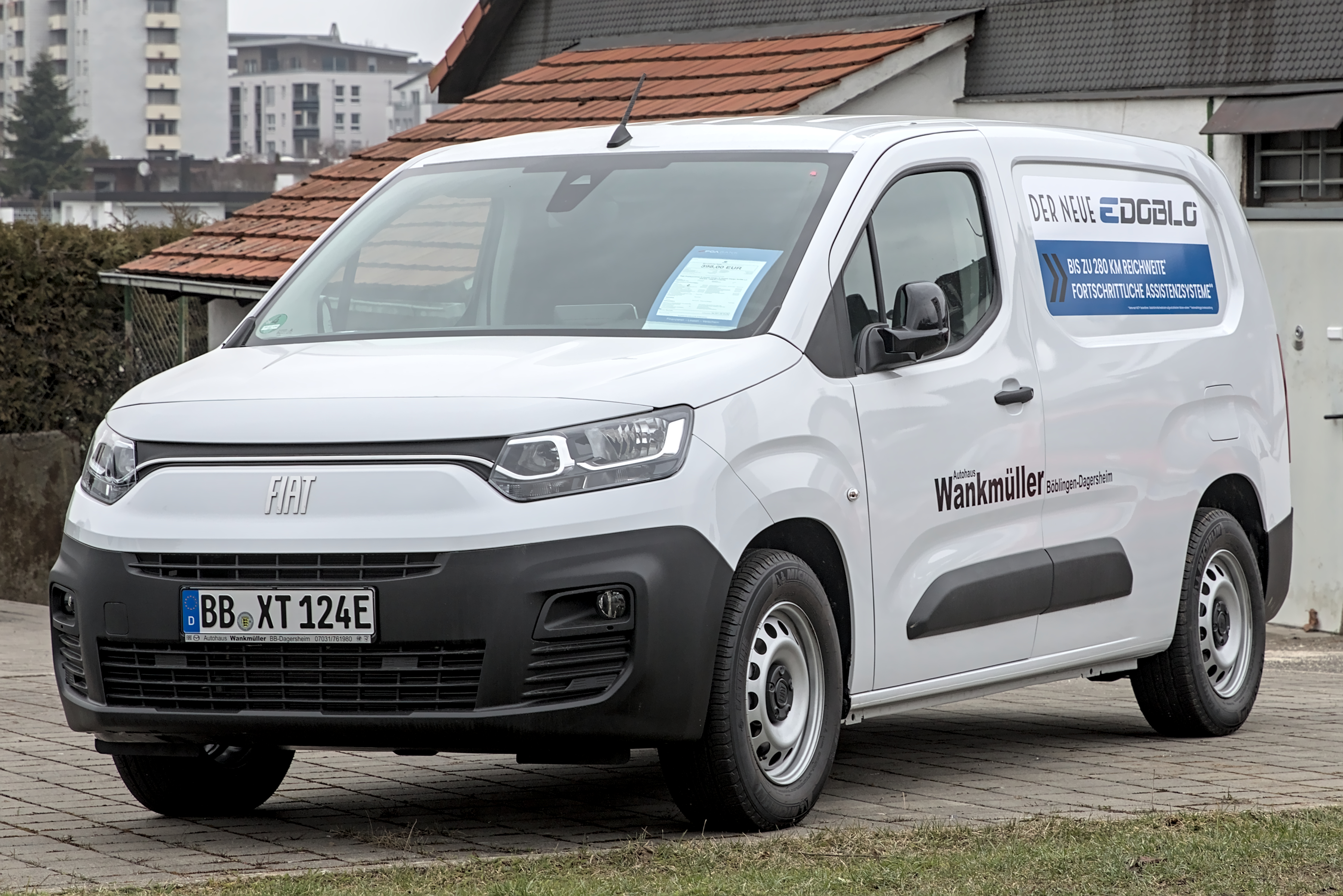
Fiat E-Doblò

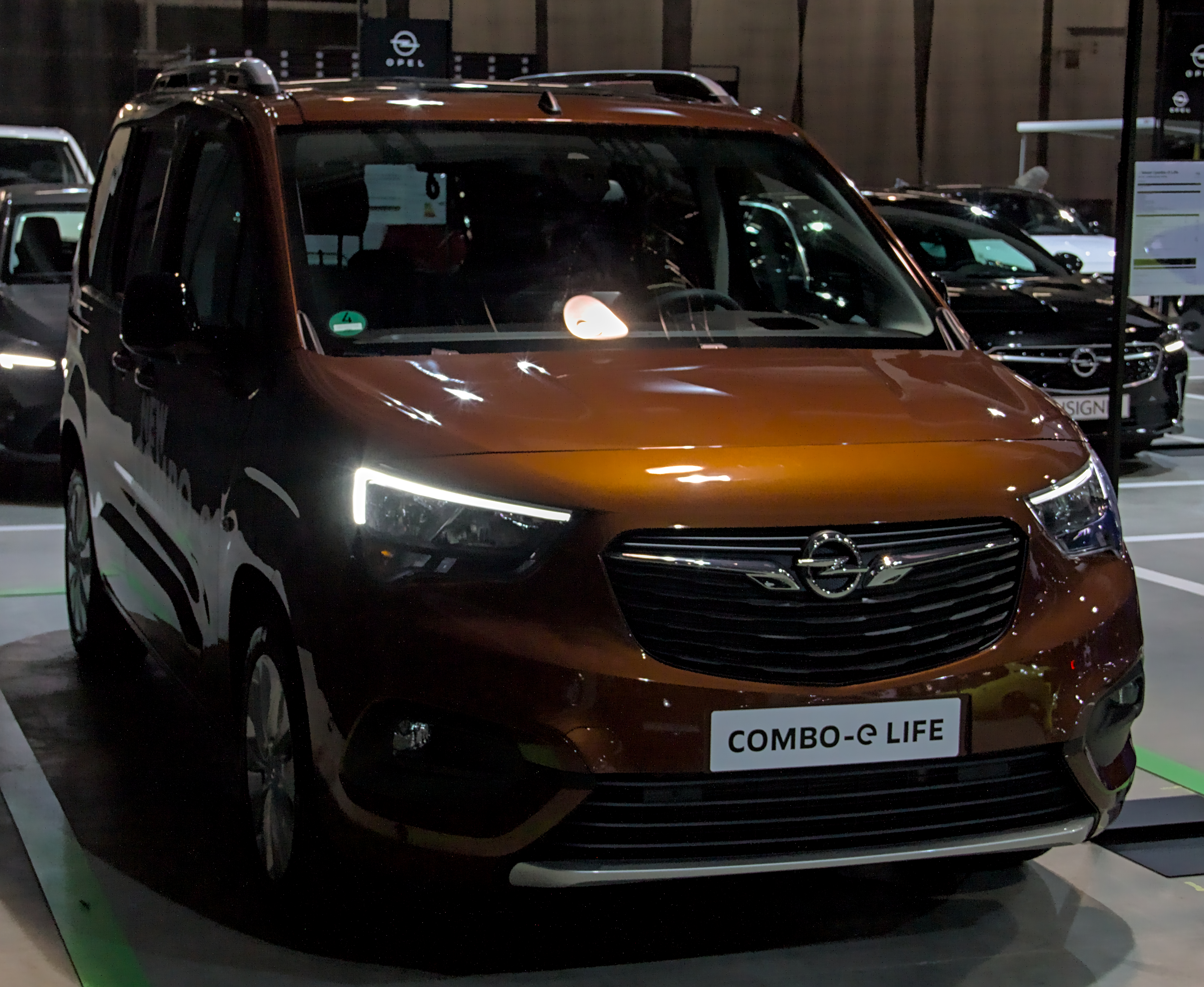
Opel Combo-e Life

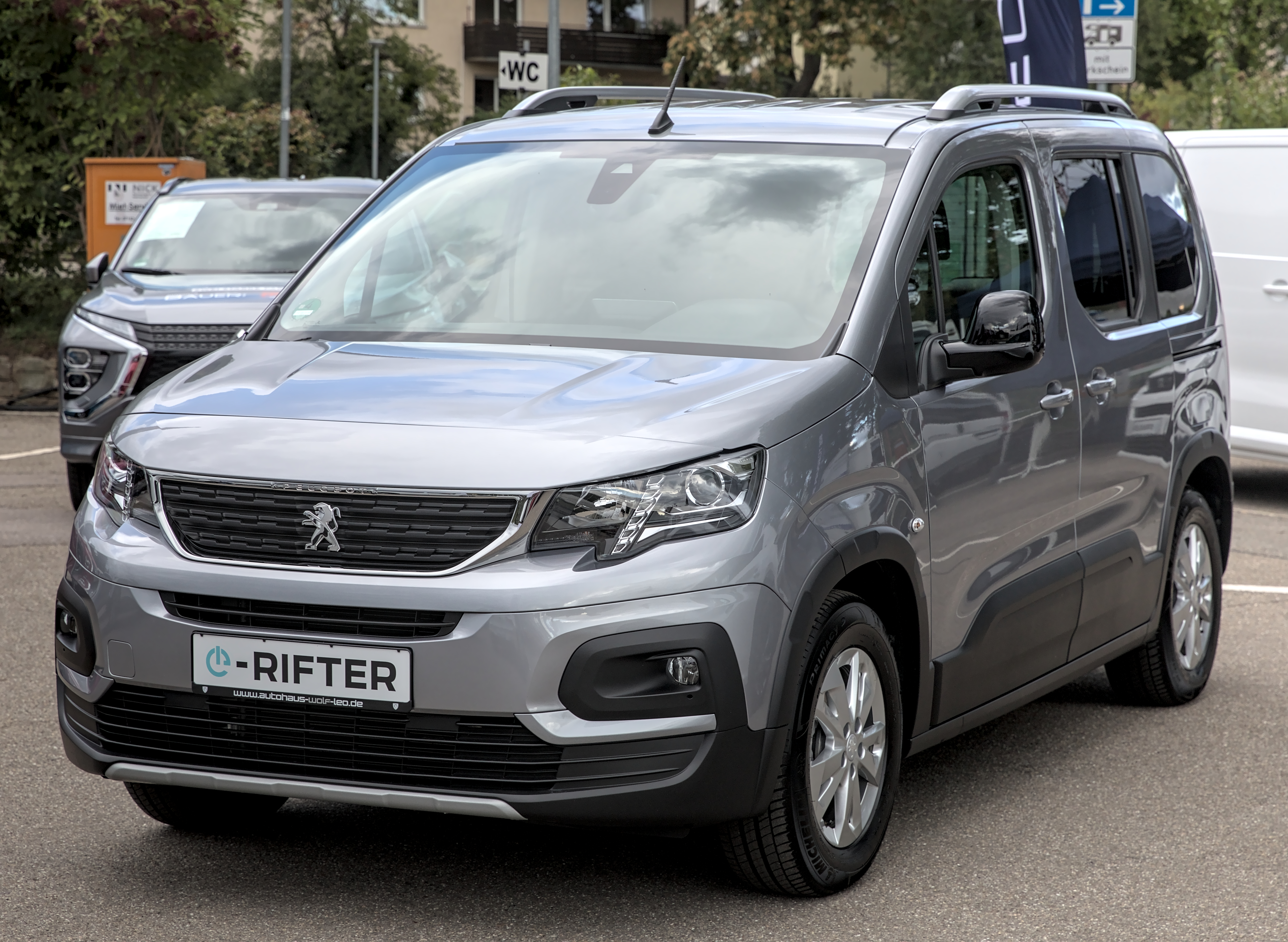
Peugeot e-Rifter

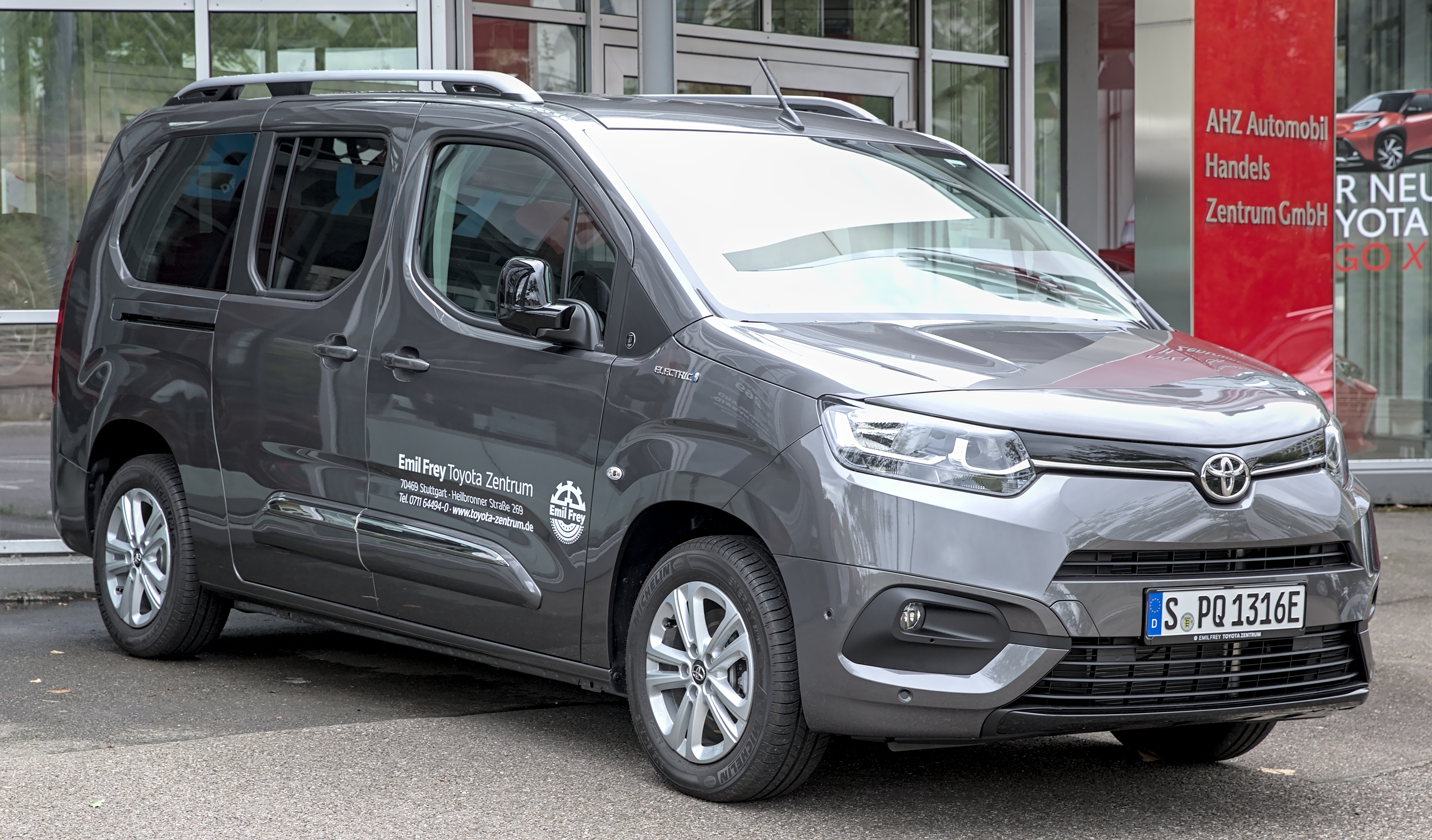
Toyota ProAce City Verso Electric

==== 2024 facelift ====
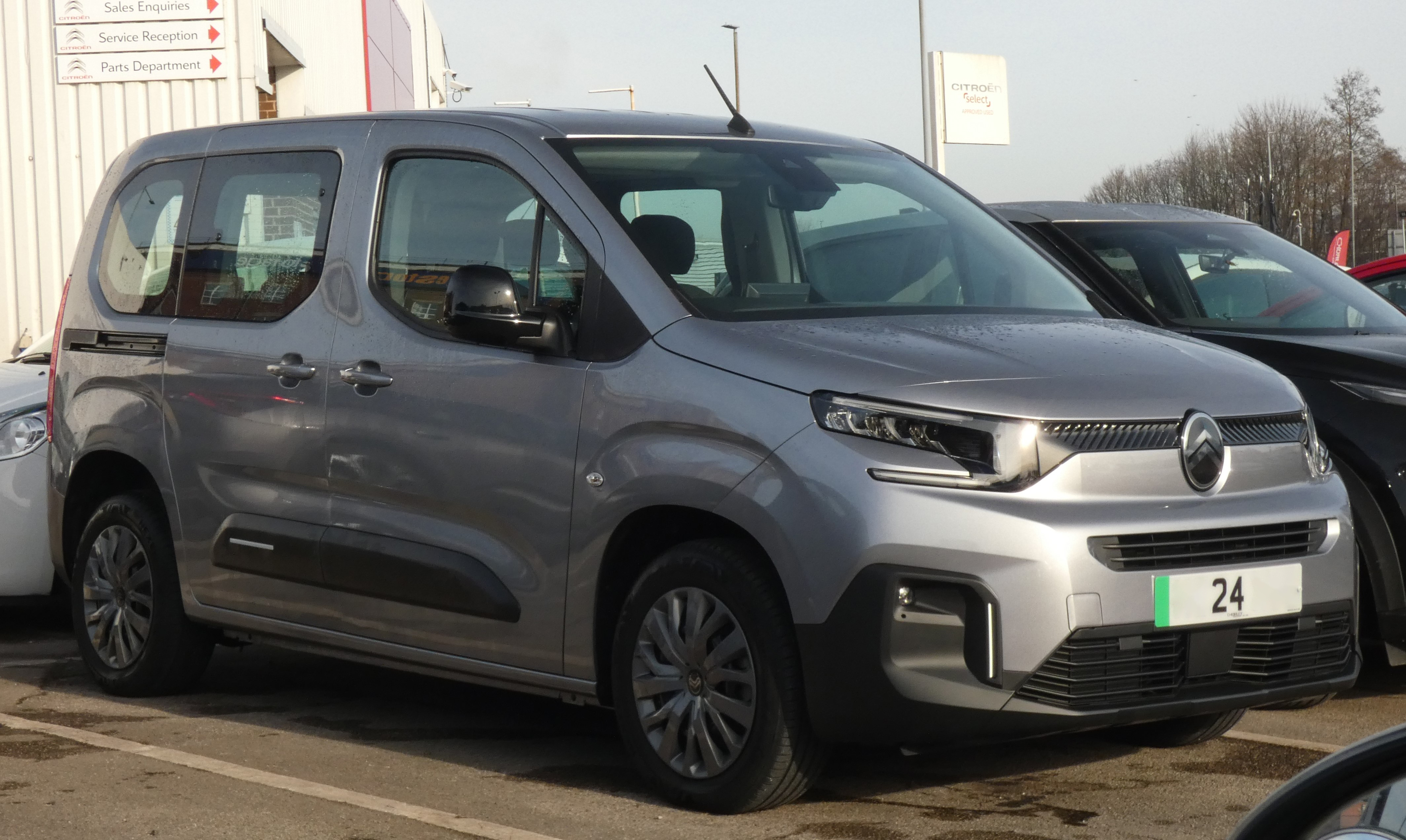
Citroën ë-Berlingo Multispace

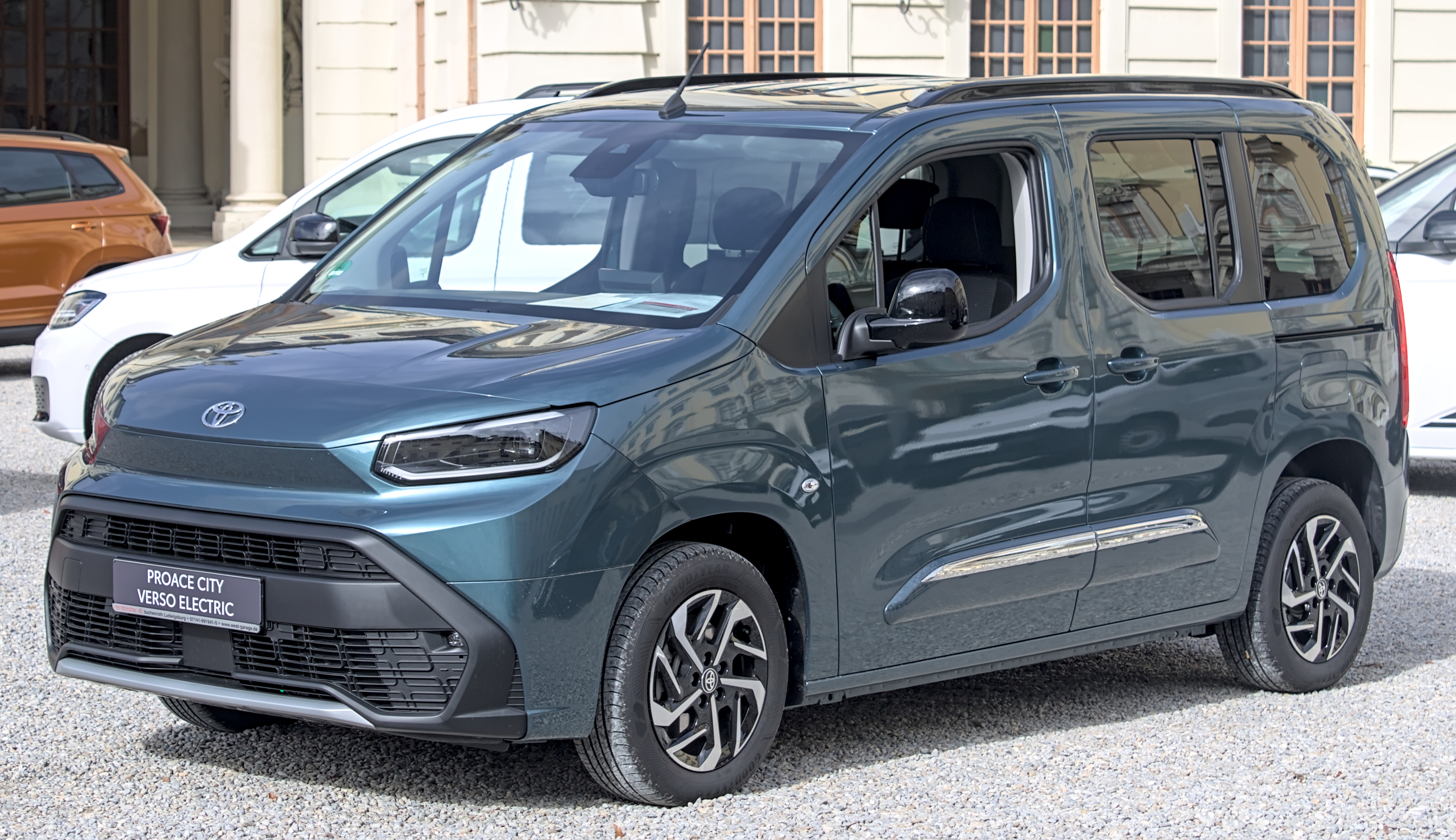
Toyota ProAce City Verso Electric

==== ë-Berlingo ====
Equivalent models
Marque	Light commercial vehicle (LCV)	Multi purpose vehicle (MPV)
Citroën	ë-Berlingo Van	ë-Berlingo
Fiat	E-Doblò	E-Qubo
Opel (EU)	Combo-e Cargo	Combo-e Life
Peugeot	e-Partner	e-Rifter
Toyota	ProAce City Electric	ProAce City Verso Electric
Vauxhall (UK)	Combo Electric	Combo Life Electric

In 2020, PSA Group confirmed that electric versions of the third-generation Berlingo would be launched in 2021. On 14 January 2021, Citroën unveiled the electric ë-Berlingo Van, based on the third-generation Berlingo, which was followed 6 days later by the Opel Combo-e Cargo and the Vauxhall Combo-e, and again 6 days later by the Peugeot e-Partner LCV. On 26 February 2021 Peugeot introduced e-Rifter MPV, and on 4 May 2021, Toyota unveiled ProAce City Electric (LCV) and ProAce City Verso Electric (MPV). Fiat unveiled their re-badged version, the E-Doblò, in June 2022.

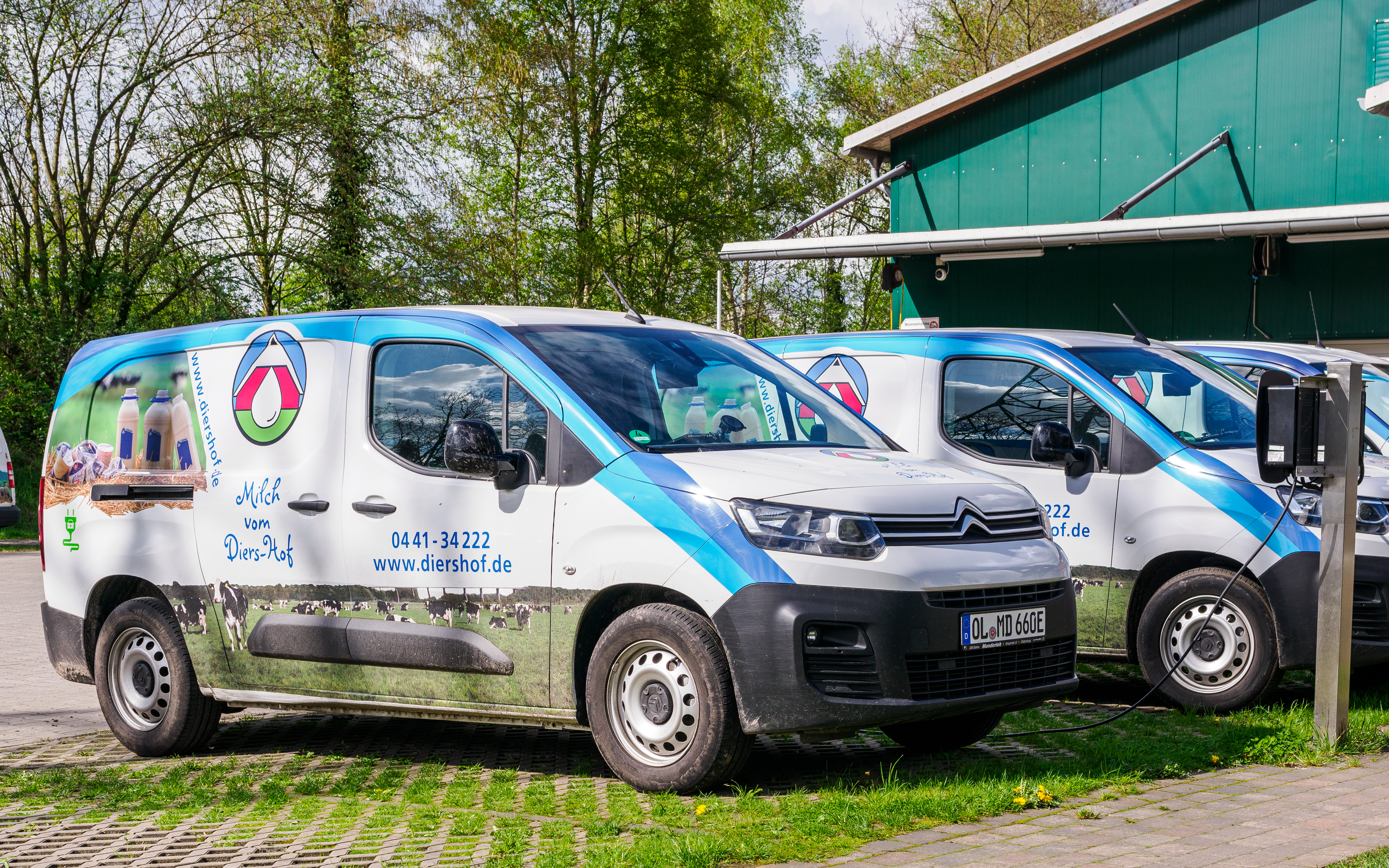
Citroën ë-Berlingo van

In January 2022, Stellantis announced they were discontinuing all diesel-powered passenger (MPV) versions of the Citroën Berlingo, including the Vauxhall/Opel Combo Life and the Peugeot Rifter, in the United Kingdom and European Union, leaving only the battery-electric variants in those markets.

The ë-Berlingo and its rebadged variants are fitted with the same drivetrain as the larger ë-Jumpy, including an electric traction motor that develops 100 kW (130 hp) and 260 N⋅m (190 lbf⋅ft) of torque and a high-voltage lithium-ion battery with a capacity of 50 kW-hr. These give the ë-Berlingo a range of 280 km (170 mi) on the WLTP driving cycle; the motor and battery are shared with other e-CMP vehicles, including the ë-C4. Observed energy consumption was 2.5–3 mi/kWh (1.1–1.3 km/MJ) or 84–102 mpg‑e. The standard on-board charger has a maximum input power of 7.4 kW (AC); this can be upgraded to accept 11 kW (AC) and 100 kW (DC).

The vehicle is available in two sizes; the larger XL has an extended wheelbase and is 35 cm (14 in) longer overall, accommodating 7 people in passenger form, while the shorter M accommodates 5. Behind the second row, the cargo area is either 775 or 1,050 L (27.4 or 37.1 ft^{3}), for the M or XL, respectively. The curb weight of the longer XL passenger version is 1,801 kg (3,971 lb).

Key ë-Berlingo dimensions & specifications
Parameter	M	XL
Length	4,403 mm (173.3 in)	4,753 mm (187.1 in)
Wheelbase	2,785 mm (109.6 in)	2,975 mm (117.1 in)
Kerb weight	1,664 kg (3,668 lb)	1,801 kg (3,971 lb)
Range (WLTP)	174–177 mi (280–285 km)	167–168 mi (269–270 km)
Consumption	227–187 Wh/km (92–112 mpg‑e)	
