= Period 5 element =

Fifth row of the periodic table

A period 5 element is one of the chemical elements in the fifth row (or period) of the periodic table of the chemical elements. The periodic table is laid out in rows to illustrate recurring (periodic) trends in the chemical behaviour of the elements as their atomic number increases: a new row is begun when chemical behaviour begins to repeat, meaning that elements with similar behaviour fall into the same vertical columns. The fifth period contains 18 elements, beginning with rubidium and ending with xenon. As a rule, period 5 elements fill their 5s shells first, then their 4d, and 5p shells, in that order; however, there are exceptions, such as rhodium.

== Physical properties ==
This period contains technetium, one of the two elements until lead that has no stable isotopes (along with promethium), as well as molybdenum and iodine, two of the heaviest elements with a known biological role. Niobium has the largest known magnetic penetration depth of all the elements. Zirconium is one of the main components of zircon crystals, currently the oldest known minerals in the Earth's crust. Many later transition metals, such as rhodium, are very commonly used in jewelry as they are very shiny.

This period is known to have a large number of exceptions to the Madelung rule.

== Elements and their properties ==
Chemical element			Block	Electron configuration
37	Rb	Rubidium	s-block	[Kr] 5s^{1}
38	Sr	Strontium	s-block	[Kr] 5s^{2}
39	Y	Yttrium	d-block	[Kr] 4d^{1} 5s^{2}
40	Zr	Zirconium	d-block	[Kr] 4d^{2} 5s^{2}
41	Nb	Niobium	d-block	[Kr] 4d^{4} 5s^{1} (*)
42	Mo	Molybdenum	d-block	[Kr] 4d^{5} 5s^{1} (*)
43	Tc	Technetium	d-block	[Kr] 4d^{5} 5s^{2}
44	Ru	Ruthenium	d-block	[Kr] 4d^{7} 5s^{1} (*)
45	Rh	Rhodium	d-block	[Kr] 4d^{8} 5s^{1} (*)
46	Pd	Palladium	d-block	[Kr] 4d^{10} (*)
47	Ag	Silver	d-block	[Kr] 4d^{10} 5s^{1} (*)
48	Cd	Cadmium	d-block	[Kr] 4d^{10} 5s^{2}
49	In	Indium	p-block	[Kr] 4d^{10} 5s^{2} 5p^{1}
50	Sn	Tin	p-block	[Kr] 4d^{10} 5s^{2} 5p^{2}
51	Sb	Antimony	p-block	[Kr] 4d^{10} 5s^{2} 5p^{3}
52	Te	Tellurium	p-block	[Kr] 4d^{10} 5s^{2} 5p^{4}
53	I	Iodine	p-block	[Kr] 4d^{10} 5s^{2} 5p^{5}
54	Xe	Xenon	p-block	[Kr] 4d^{10} 5s^{2} 5p^{6}

(*) Exception to the Madelung rule

== s-block elements ==
=== Rubidium ===
Rubidium is the first element placed in period 5. It is an alkali metal, the most reactive group in the periodic table, having properties and similarities with both other alkali metals and other period 5 elements. For example, rubidium has 5 electron shells, a property found in all other period 5 elements, whereas its electron configuration's ending is similar to all other alkali metals: s^{1}. Rubidium also follows the trend of increasing reactivity as the atomic number increases in the alkali metals, for it is more reactive than potassium, but less so than caesium. In addition, both potassium and rubidium yield almost the same hue when ignited, so researchers must use different methods to differentiate between these two 1st group elements. Rubidium is very susceptible to oxidation in air, similar to most of the other alkali metals, so it readily transforms into rubidium oxide, a yellow solid with the chemical formula Rb_{2}O.

=== Strontium ===
Strontium is the second element placed in the 5th period. It is an alkaline earth metal, a relatively reactive group, although not nearly as reactive as the alkali metals. Like rubidium, it has 5 electron shells or energy levels, and in accordance with the Madelung rule it has two electrons in its 5s subshell. Strontium is a soft metal and is extremely reactive upon contact with water. If it comes in contact with water, it will combine with the atoms of both oxygen and hydrogen to form strontium hydroxide and pure hydrogen gas which quickly diffuses in the air. In addition, strontium, like rubidium, oxidizes in air and turns a yellow color. When ignited, it will burn with a strong red flame.

== d-block elements ==
=== Yttrium ===
Yttrium is a chemical element with symbol Y and atomic number 39. It is a silvery-metallic transition metal chemically similar to the lanthanides and it has often been classified as a "rare earth element". Yttrium is almost always found combined with the lanthanides in rare earth minerals and is never found in nature as a free element. Its only stable isotope, ^{89}Y, is also its only naturally occurring isotope.

In 1787, Carl Axel Arrhenius found a new mineral near Ytterby in Sweden and named it ytterbite, after the village. Johan Gadolin discovered yttrium's oxide in Arrhenius' sample in 1789, and Anders Gustaf Ekeberg named the new oxide yttria. Elemental yttrium was first isolated in 1828 by Friedrich Wöhler.

The most important use of yttrium is in making phosphors, such as the red ones used in television set cathode-ray tube (CRT) displays and in LEDs. Other uses include the production of electrodes, electrolytes, electronic filters, lasers and superconductors; various medical applications; and as traces in various materials to enhance their properties. Yttrium has no known biological role, and exposure to yttrium compounds can cause lung disease in humans.

=== Zirconium ===
Zirconium is a chemical element with the symbol Zr and atomic number 40. The name of zirconium is taken from the mineral zircon. Its atomic mass is 91.224. It is a lustrous, gray-white, strong transition metal that resembles titanium. Zirconium is mainly used as a refractory and opacifier, although minor amounts are used as alloying agent for its strong resistance to corrosion. Zirconium is obtained mainly from the mineral zircon, which is the most important form of zirconium in use.

Zirconium forms a variety of inorganic and organometallic compounds such as zirconium dioxide and zirconocene dichloride, respectively. Five isotopes occur naturally, three of which are stable. Zirconium compounds have no biological role.

=== Niobium ===
Niobium, or columbium, is a chemical element with the symbol Nb and atomic number 41. It is a soft, grey, ductile transition metal, which is often found in the pyrochlore mineral, the main commercial source for niobium, and columbite. The name comes from Greek mythology: Niobe, daughter of Tantalus.

Niobium has physical and chemical properties similar to those of the element tantalum, and the two are therefore difficult to distinguish. The English chemist Charles Hatchett reported a new element similar to tantalum in 1801, and named it columbium. In 1809, the English chemist William Hyde Wollaston wrongly concluded that tantalum and columbium were identical. The German chemist Heinrich Rose determined in 1846 that tantalum ores contain a second element, which he named niobium. In 1864 and 1865, a series of scientific findings clarified that niobium and columbium were the same element (as distinguished from tantalum), and for a century both names were used interchangeably. The name of the element was officially adopted as niobium in 1949.

It was not until the early 20th century that niobium was first used commercially. Brazil is the leading producer of niobium and ferroniobium, an alloy of niobium and iron. Niobium is used mostly in alloys, the largest part in special steel such as that used in gas pipelines. Although alloys contain only a maximum of 0.1%, that small percentage of niobium improves the strength of the steel. The temperature stability of niobium-containing superalloys is important for its use in jet and rocket engines. Niobium is used in various superconducting materials. These superconducting alloys, also containing titanium and tin, are widely used in the superconducting magnets of MRI scanners. Other applications of niobium include its use in welding, nuclear industries, electronics, optics, numismatics and jewelry. In the last two applications, niobium's low toxicity and ability to be colored by anodization are particular advantages.

=== Molybdenum ===
Molybdenum is a Group 6 chemical element with the symbol Mo and atomic number 42. The name is from Neo-Latin Molybdaenum, from Ancient Greek Μόλυβδος molybdos, meaning lead, itself proposed as a loanword from Anatolian Luvian and Lydian languages, since its ores were confused with lead ores. The free element, which is a silvery metal, has the sixth-highest melting point of any element. It readily forms hard, stable carbides, and for this reason it is often used in high-strength steel alloys. Molybdenum does not occur as a free metal on Earth, but rather in various oxidation states in minerals. Industrially, molybdenum compounds are used in high-pressure and high-temperature applications, as pigments and catalysts.

Molybdenum minerals have long been known, but the element was "discovered" (in the sense of differentiating it as a new entity from the mineral salts of other metals) in 1778 by Carl Wilhelm Scheele. The metal was first isolated in 1781 by Peter Jacob Hjelm.

Most molybdenum compounds have low solubility in water, but the molybdate ion MoO_{4}^{2−} is soluble and forms when molybdenum-containing minerals are in contact with oxygen and water.

=== Technetium ===
Technetium is the chemical element with atomic number 43 and symbol Tc. It is the lowest atomic number element without any stable isotopes; every form of it is radioactive. Nearly all technetium is produced synthetically and only minute amounts are found in nature. Naturally occurring technetium occurs as a spontaneous fission product in uranium ore or by neutron capture in molybdenum ores. The chemical properties of this silvery gray, crystalline transition metal are intermediate between rhenium and manganese.

Many of technetium's properties were predicted by Dmitri Mendeleev before the element was discovered. Mendeleev noted a gap in his periodic table and gave the undiscovered element the provisional name ekamanganese (Em). In 1937 technetium (specifically the technetium-97 isotope) became the first predominantly artificial element to be produced, hence its name (from the Greek τεχνητός, meaning "artificial").

Its short-lived gamma ray-emitting nuclear isomer—technetium-99m—is used in nuclear medicine for a wide variety of diagnostic tests. Technetium-99 is used as a gamma ray-free source of beta particles. Long-lived technetium isotopes produced commercially are by-products of fission of uranium-235 in nuclear reactors and are extracted from nuclear fuel rods. Because no isotope of technetium has a half-life longer than 4.2 million years (technetium-98), its detection in red giants in 1952, which are billions of years old, helped bolster the theory that stars can produce heavier elements.

=== Ruthenium ===
Ruthenium is a chemical element with symbol Ru and atomic number 44. It is a rare transition metal belonging to the platinum group of the periodic table. Like the other metals of the platinum group, ruthenium is inert to most chemicals. The Russian scientist Karl Ernst Claus discovered the element in 1844 and named it after Ruthenia, the Latin word for Rus'. Ruthenium usually occurs as a minor component of platinum ores and its annual production is only about 12 tonnes worldwide. Most ruthenium is used for wear-resistant electrical contacts and the production of thick-film resistors. A minor application of ruthenium is its use in some platinum alloys.

=== Rhodium ===
Rhodium is a chemical element that is a rare, silvery-white, hard, and chemically inert transition metal and a member of the platinum group. It has the chemical symbol Rh and atomic number 45. It is composed of only one isotope, ^{103}Rh. Naturally occurring rhodium is found as the free metal, alloyed with similar metals, and never as a chemical compound. It is one of the rarest precious metals and one of the most costly (gold has since taken over the top spot of cost per ounce).

Rhodium is a so-called noble metal, resistant to corrosion, found in platinum or nickel ores together with the other members of the platinum group metals. It was discovered in 1803 by William Hyde Wollaston in one such ore, and named for the rose color of one of its chlorine compounds, produced after it reacted with the powerful acid mixture aqua regia.

The element's major use (about 80% of world rhodium production) is as one of the catalysts in the three-way catalytic converters of automobiles. Because rhodium metal is inert against corrosion and most aggressive chemicals, and because of its rarity, rhodium is usually alloyed with platinum or palladium and applied in high-temperature and corrosion-resistive coatings. White gold is often plated with a thin rhodium layer to improve its optical impression while sterling silver is often rhodium plated for tarnish resistance.

Rhodium detectors are used in nuclear reactors to measure the neutron flux level.

=== Palladium ===
Palladium is a chemical element with the chemical symbol Pd and an atomic number of 46. It is a rare and lustrous silvery-white metal discovered in 1803 by William Hyde Wollaston. He named it after the asteroid Pallas, which was itself named after the epithet of the Greek goddess Athena, acquired by her when she slew Pallas. Palladium, platinum, rhodium, ruthenium, iridium and osmium form a group of elements referred to as the platinum group metals (PGMs). These have similar chemical properties, but palladium has the lowest melting point and is the least dense of them.

The unique properties of palladium and other platinum group metals account for their widespread use. A quarter of all goods manufactured today either contain PGMs or have a significant part in their manufacturing process played by PGMs. Over half of the supply of palladium and its congener platinum goes into catalytic converters, which convert up to 90% of harmful gases from auto exhaust (hydrocarbons, carbon monoxide, and nitrogen dioxide) into less-harmful substances (nitrogen, carbon dioxide and water vapor). Palladium is also used in electronics, dentistry, medicine, hydrogen purification, chemical applications, and groundwater treatment. Palladium plays a key role in the technology used for fuel cells, which combine hydrogen and oxygen to produce electricity, heat, and water.

Ore deposits of palladium and other PGMs are rare, and the most extensive deposits have been found in the norite belt of the Bushveld Igneous Complex covering the Transvaal Basin in South Africa, the Stillwater Complex in Montana, United States, the Thunder Bay District of Ontario, Canada, and the Norilsk Complex in Russia. Recycling is also a source of palladium, mostly from scrapped catalytic converters. The numerous applications and limited supply sources of palladium result in the metal attracting considerable investment interest.

=== Silver ===
Silver is a metallic chemical element with the chemical symbol Ag (Latin: argentum, from the Indo-European root *arg- for "grey" or "shining") and atomic number 47. A soft, white, lustrous transition metal, it has the highest electrical conductivity of any element and the highest thermal conductivity of any metal. The metal occurs naturally in its pure, free form (native silver), as an alloy with gold and other metals, and in minerals such as argentite and chlorargyrite. Most silver is produced as a byproduct of copper, gold, lead, and zinc refining.

Silver has long been valued as a precious metal, and it is used to make ornaments, jewelry, high-value tableware, utensils (hence the term silverware), and currency coins. Today, silver metal is also used in electrical contacts and conductors, in mirrors and in catalysis of chemical reactions. Its compounds are used in photographic film, and dilute silver nitrate solutions and other silver compounds are used as disinfectants and microbiocides. While many medical antimicrobial uses of silver have been supplanted by antibiotics, further research into clinical potential continues.

=== Cadmium ===
Cadmium is a chemical element with the symbol Cd and atomic number 48. This soft, bluish-white metal is chemically similar to the two other stable metals in group 12, zinc and mercury. Like zinc, it prefers oxidation state +2 in most of its compounds and like mercury it shows a low melting point compared to transition metals. Cadmium and its congeners are not always considered transition metals, in that they do not have partly filled d or f electron shells in the elemental or common oxidation states. The average concentration of cadmium in the Earth's crust is between 0.1 and 0.5 parts per million (ppm). It was discovered in 1817 simultaneously by Stromeyer and Hermann, both in Germany, as an impurity in zinc carbonate.

Cadmium occurs as a minor component in most zinc ores and therefore is a byproduct of zinc production. It was used for a long time as a pigment and for corrosion resistant plating on steel while cadmium compounds were used to stabilize plastic. With the exception of its use in nickel–cadmium batteries and cadmium telluride solar panels, the use of cadmium is generally decreasing. These declines have been due to competing technologies, cadmium's toxicity in certain forms and concentration and resulting regulations.

== p-block elements ==
=== Indium ===
Indium is a chemical element with the symbol In and atomic number 49. This rare, very soft, malleable and easily fusible other metal is chemically similar to gallium and thallium, and shows the intermediate properties between these two. Indium was discovered in 1863 and named for the indigo blue line in its spectrum that was the first indication of its existence in zinc ores, as a new and unknown element. The metal was first isolated in the following year. Zinc ores continue to be the primary source of indium, where it is found in compound form. Very rarely the element can be found as grains of native (free) metal, but these are not of commercial importance.

Indium's current primary application is to form transparent electrodes from indium tin oxide in liquid crystal displays and touchscreens, and this use largely determines its global mining production. It is widely used in thin-films to form lubricated layers (during World War II it was widely used to coat bearings in high-performance aircraft). It is also used for making particularly low melting point alloys, and is a component in some lead-free solders.

Indium is not known to be used by any organism. In a similar way to aluminium salts, indium(III) ions can be toxic to the kidney when given by injection, but oral indium compounds do not have the chronic toxicity of salts of heavy metals, probably due to poor absorption in basic conditions. Radioactive indium-111 (in very small amounts on a chemical basis) is used in nuclear medicine tests, as a radiotracer to follow the movement of labeled proteins and white blood cells in the body.

=== Tin ===
Tin is a chemical element with the symbol Sn (for Latin: stannum) and atomic number 50. It is a main-group metal in group 14 of the periodic table. Tin shows chemical similarity to both neighboring group 14 elements, germanium and lead and has two possible oxidation states, +2 and the slightly more stable +4. Tin is the 49th most abundant element and has, with 10 stable isotopes, the largest number of stable isotopes in the periodic table. Tin is obtained chiefly from the mineral cassiterite, where it occurs as tin dioxide, SnO_{2}.

This silvery, malleable post-transition metal is not easily oxidized in air and is used to coat other metals to prevent corrosion. The first alloy, used in large scale since 3000 BC, was bronze, an alloy of tin and copper. After 600 BC pure metallic tin was produced. Pewter, which is an alloy of 85–90% tin with the remainder commonly consisting of copper, antimony and lead, was used for tableware from the Bronze Age until the 20th century. In modern times tin is used in many alloys, most notably tin/lead soft solders, typically containing 60% or more of tin. Another large application for tin is corrosion-resistant tin plating of steel. Because of its low toxicity, tin-plated metal is also used for food packaging, giving the name to tin cans, which are made mostly of steel.

=== Antimony ===
Antimony (Latin: stibium) is a toxic chemical element with the symbol Sb and an atomic number of 51. A lustrous grey metalloid, it is found in nature mainly as the sulfide mineral stibnite (Sb_{2}S_{3}). Antimony compounds have been known since ancient times and were used for cosmetics, metallic antimony was also known but mostly identified as lead.

For some time China has been the largest producer of antimony and its compounds, with most production coming from the Xikuangshan Mine in Hunan. Antimony compounds are prominent additives for chlorine and bromine containing fire retardants found in many commercial and domestic products. The largest application for metallic antimony is as alloying material for lead and tin. It improves the properties of the alloys which are used as in solders, bullets and ball bearings. An emerging application is the use of antimony in microelectronics.

=== Tellurium ===
Tellurium is a chemical element that has the symbol Te and atomic number 52. A brittle, mildly toxic, rare, silver-white metalloid which looks similar to tin, tellurium is chemically related to selenium and sulfur. It is occasionally found in native form, as elemental crystals. Tellurium is far more common in the universe than on Earth. Its extreme rarity in the Earth's crust, comparable to that of platinum, is partly due to its high atomic number, but also due to its formation of a volatile hydride which caused the element to be lost to space as a gas during the hot nebular formation of the planet.

Tellurium was discovered in Transylvania (today part of Romania) in 1782 by Franz-Joseph Müller von Reichenstein in a mineral containing tellurium and gold. Martin Heinrich Klaproth named the new element in 1798 after the Latin word for "earth", tellus. Gold telluride minerals (responsible for the name of Telluride, Colorado) are the most notable natural gold compounds. However, they are not a commercially significant source of tellurium itself, which is normally extracted as by-product of copper and lead production.

Tellurium is commercially primarily used in alloys, foremost in steel and copper to improve machinability. Applications in solar panels and as a semiconductor material also consume a considerable fraction of tellurium production.

=== Iodine ===
Iodine is a chemical element with the symbol I and atomic number 53. The name is from Greek ἰοειδής ioeidēs, meaning violet or purple, due to the color of elemental iodine vapor.

Iodine and its compounds are primarily used in nutrition, and industrially in the production of acetic acid and certain polymers. Iodine's relatively high atomic number, low toxicity, and ease of attachment to organic compounds have made it a part of many X-ray contrast materials in modern medicine. Iodine has only one stable isotope. A number of iodine radioisotopes are also used in medical applications.

Iodine is found on Earth mainly as the highly water-soluble iodide I^{−}, which concentrates it in oceans and brine pools. Like the other halogens, free iodine occurs mainly as a diatomic molecule I_{2}, and then only momentarily after being oxidized from iodide by an oxidant like free oxygen. In the universe and on Earth, iodine's high atomic number makes it a relatively rare element. However, its presence in ocean water has given it a role in biology (see below).

=== Xenon ===
Xenon is a chemical element with the symbol Xe and atomic number 54. A colorless, heavy, odorless noble gas, xenon occurs in the Earth's atmosphere in trace amounts. Although generally unreactive, xenon can undergo a few chemical reactions such as the formation of xenon hexafluoroplatinate, the first noble gas compound to be synthesized.

Naturally occurring xenon consists of nine stable isotopes. There are also over 40 unstable isotopes that undergo radioactive decay. The isotope ratios of xenon are an important tool for studying the early history of the Solar System. Radioactive xenon-135 is produced from iodine-135 as a result of nuclear fission, and it acts as the most significant neutron absorber in nuclear reactors.

Xenon is used in flash lamps and arc lamps, and as a general anesthetic. The first excimer laser design used a xenon dimer molecule (Xe_{2}) as its lasing medium, and the earliest laser designs used xenon flash lamps as pumps. Xenon is also being used to search for hypothetical weakly interacting massive particles and as the propellant for ion thrusters in spacecraft.

== Biological role ==
Rubidium, strontium, yttrium, zirconium, and niobium have no biological role. Yttrium can cause lung disease in humans.

Molybdenum-containing enzymes are used as catalysts by some bacteria to break the chemical bond in atmospheric molecular nitrogen, allowing biological nitrogen fixation. At least 50 molybdenum-containing enzymes are now known in bacteria and animals, though only the bacterial and cyanobacterial enzymes are involved in nitrogen fixation. Owing to the diverse functions of the remainder of the enzymes, molybdenum is a required element for life in higher organisms (eukaryotes), though not in all bacteria.

Technetium, ruthenium, rhodium, palladium, and silver have no biological role. Although cadmium has no known biological role in higher organisms, a cadmium-dependent carbonic anhydrase has been found in marine diatoms. Rats fed a tin-free diet exhibited improper growth, but the evidence for essentiality is otherwise limited. Indium has no biological role and can be toxic as well as antimony.

Tellurium has no biological role, although fungi can incorporate it in place of sulfur and selenium into amino acids such as tellurocysteine and telluromethionine. In humans, tellurium is partly metabolized into dimethyl telluride, (CH_{3})_{2}Te, a gas with a garlic-like odor which is exhaled in the breath of victims of tellurium toxicity or exposure.

Iodine is the heaviest essential element utilized widely by life in biological functions (only tungsten, employed in enzymes by a few species of bacteria, is heavier). Iodine's rarity in many soils, due to initial low abundance as a crust-element, and also leaching of soluble iodide by rainwater, has led to many deficiency problems in land animals and inland human populations. Iodine deficiency affects about two billion people and is the leading preventable cause of intellectual disabilities. Iodine is required by higher animals, which use it to synthesize thyroid hormones, which contain the element. Because of this function, radioisotopes of iodine are concentrated in the thyroid gland along with nonradioactive iodine. The radioisotope iodine-131, which has a high fission product yield, concentrates in the thyroid, and is one of the most carcinogenic of nuclear fission products.

Xenon has no biological role, and is used as a general anaesthetic.
