= Tellurium =

Tellurium, _{52}Te
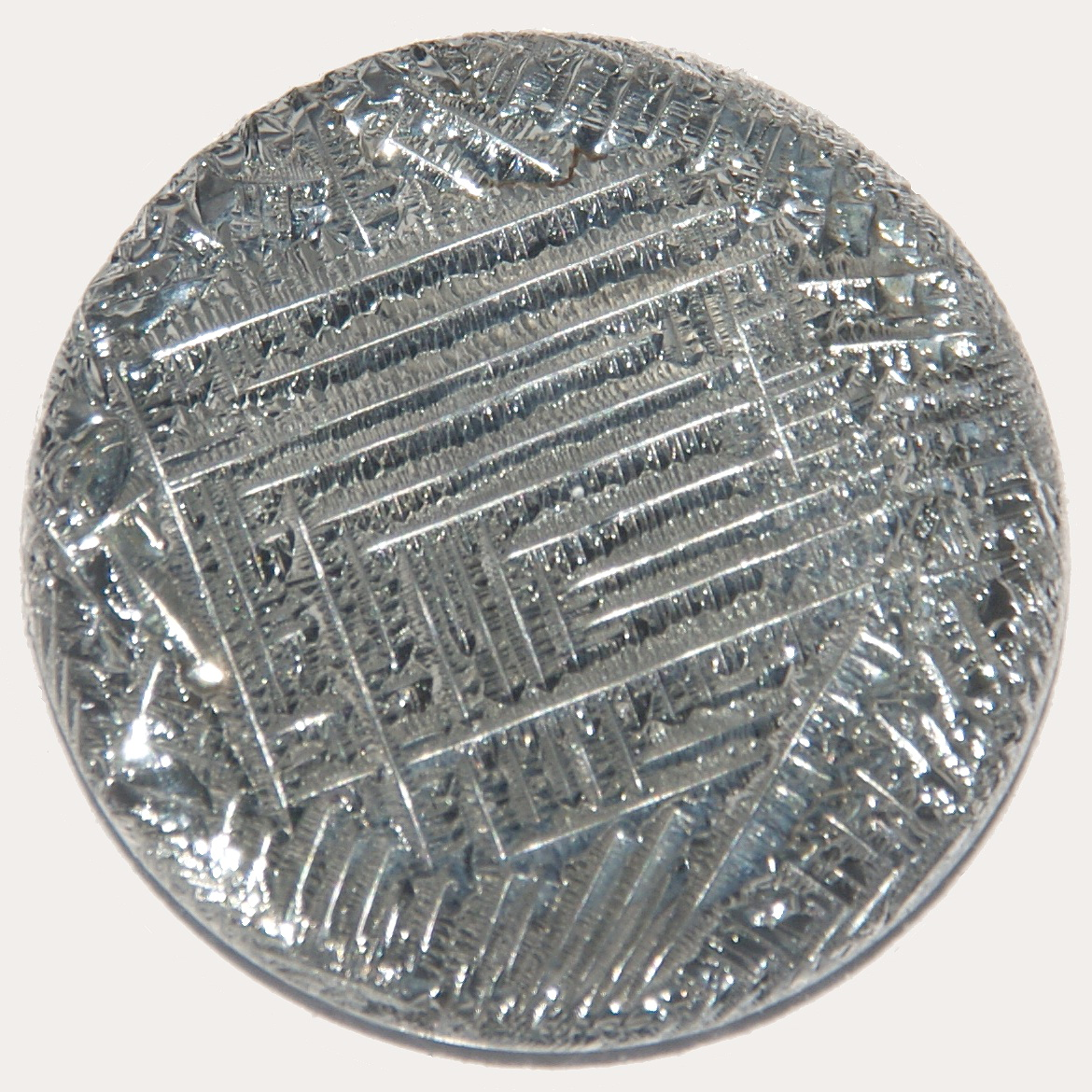

Tellurium
- Pronunciation: /tɛˈljʊəriəm/ (teh-LURE-ee-əm)
- Appearance: silvery lustrous gray (crystalline), brown-black powder (amorphous)

Standard atomic weight A_{r}°(Te)
- 127.60±0.03; 127.60±0.03 (abridged)

Tellurium in the periodic table
| Hydrogen | | | | | | | | | | | | | | | | | | | | | | | | | | | | | | | Helium |
| Lithium | Beryllium | | | | | | | | | | | | | | | | | | | | | | | | | Boron | Carbon | Nitrogen | Oxygen | Fluorine | Neon |
| Sodium | Magnesium | | | | | | | | | | | | | | | | | | | | | | | | | Aluminium | Silicon | Phosphorus | Sulfur | Chlorine | Argon |
| Potassium | Calcium | | | | | | | | | | | | | | | Scandium | Titanium | Vanadium | Chromium | Manganese | Iron | Cobalt | Nickel | Copper | Zinc | Gallium | Germanium | Arsenic | Selenium | Bromine | Krypton |
| Rubidium | Strontium | | | | | | | | | | | | | | | Yttrium | Zirconium | Niobium | Molybdenum | Technetium | Ruthenium | Rhodium | Palladium | Silver | Cadmium | Indium | Tin | Antimony | Tellurium | Iodine | Xenon |
| Caesium | Barium | Lanthanum | Cerium | Praseodymium | Neodymium | Promethium | Samarium | Europium | Gadolinium | Terbium | Dysprosium | Holmium | Erbium | Thulium | Ytterbium | Lutetium | Hafnium | Tantalum | Tungsten | Rhenium | Osmium | Iridium | Platinum | Gold | Mercury (element) | Thallium | Lead | Bismuth | Polonium | Astatine | Radon |
| Francium | Radium | Actinium | Thorium | Protactinium | Uranium | Neptunium | Plutonium | Americium | Curium | Berkelium | Californium | Einsteinium | Fermium | Mendelevium | Nobelium | Lawrencium | Rutherfordium | Dubnium | Seaborgium | Bohrium | Hassium | Meitnerium | Darmstadtium | Roentgenium | Copernicium | Nihonium | Flerovium | Moscovium | Livermorium | Tennessine | Oganesson |
Se
↑
Te
↓
Po
antimony ← tellurium → iodine
- Atomic number (Z): 52
- Group: group 16 (chalcogens)
- Period: period 5
- Block: p-block
- Electron configuration: [Kr] 4d^{10} 5s^{2} 5p^{4}
- Electrons per shell: 2, 8, 18, 18, 6

Physical properties
- Phase at STP: solid
- Melting point: 722.66 K (449.51 °C, 841.12 °F)
- Boiling point: 1261 K (988 °C, 1810 °F)
- Density (at 20° C): 6.237 g/cm^{3}
- when liquid (at m.p.): 5.70 g/cm^{3}
- Heat of fusion: 17.49 kJ/mol
- Heat of vaporization: 114.1 kJ/mol
- Molar heat capacity: 25.73 J/(mol·K)
- Specific heat capacity: 201.646 J/(kg·K)
Vapor pressure
| P (Pa) | 1 | 10 | 100 | 1 k | 10 k | 100 k |
|---|---|---|---|---|---|---|
| at T (K) | | | (775) | (888) | 1042 | 1266 |

Atomic properties
- Oxidation states: common: −2, +2, +4, +6 −1, 0, +1, +3, +5
- Electronegativity: Pauling scale: 2.1
- Ionization energies: 1st: 869.3 kJ/mol; 2nd: 1790 kJ/mol; 3rd: 2698 kJ/mol
- Atomic radius: empirical: 140 pm
- Covalent radius: 138±4 pm
- Van der Waals radius: 206 pm
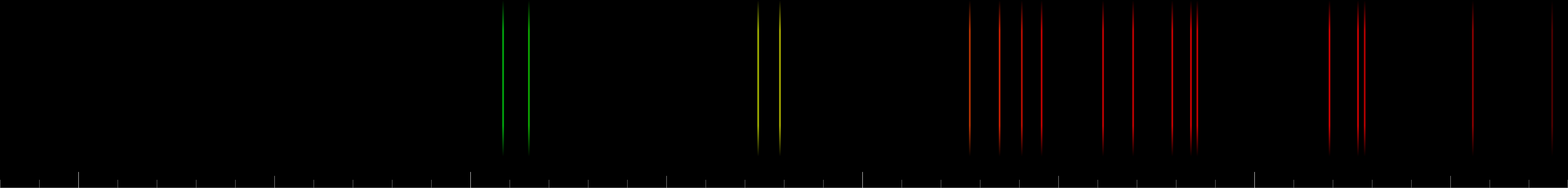
- Spectral lines of tellurium

Other properties
- Natural occurrence: primordial
- Crystal structure: hexagonal (hP3)
- Lattice constants: a = 445.59 pm c = 592.75 pm (at 20 °C)
- Thermal expansion: 19.0×10^{−6}/K (at 20 °C) (Note: The thermal expansion of tellurium is highly anisotropic: the parameters (at 20 °C) for each crystal axis are α_{a} = 29.6×10^{−6}/K, α_{c} = −2.28×10^{−6}/K, and α_{average} = α_{V}/3 = 19.0×10^{−6}/K.)
- Thermal conductivity: 1.97–3.38 W/(m⋅K)
- Magnetic ordering: diamagnetic
- Molar magnetic susceptibility: −39.5×10^{−6} cm^{3}/mol (298 K)
- Young's modulus: 43 GPa
- Shear modulus: 16 GPa
- Bulk modulus: 65 GPa
- Speed of sound thin rod: 2610 m/s (at 20 °C)
- Mohs hardness: 2.25
- Brinell hardness: 180–270 MPa
- CAS Number: 13494-80-9

History
- Naming: after Roman Tellus, deity of the Earth
- Discovery: Franz-Joseph Müller von Reichenstein (1782)
- First isolation: Martin Heinrich Klaproth

Isotopes of tellurium
| Main isotopes | | | Decay | |
| Isotope | abundance | half-life (t_{1/2}) | mode | product |
|---|---|---|---|---|
| ^{120}Te | 0.09% | stable | | |
| ^{121}Te | synth | 19.31 d | β^{+} | ^{121}Sb |
| ^{121m}Te | synth | 164.7 d | IT88.6% | ^{121}Te |
| ^{121m}Te | synth | 164.7 d | β^{+}11.4% | ^{121}Sb |
| ^{122}Te | 2.55% | stable | | |
| ^{123}Te | 0.89% | stable | | |
| ^{123m}Te | synth | 119.2 d | IT | ^{123}Te |
| ^{124}Te | 4.74% | stable | | |
| ^{125}Te | 7.07% | stable | | |
| ^{125m}Te | synth | 57.40 d | IT | ^{125}Te |
| ^{126}Te | 18.84% | stable | | |
| ^{127m}Te | synth | 106.1 d | IT97.9% | ^{127}Te |
| ^{127m}Te | synth | 106.1 d | β^{−}2.14% | ^{127}I |
| ^{128}Te | 31.74% | 7.7×10^{24} y | β^{−}β^{−} | ^{128}Xe |
| ^{129m}Te | synth | 33.6 d | IT64% | ^{129}Te |
| ^{129m}Te | synth | 33.6 d | β^{−}36% | ^{129}I |
| ^{130}Te | 34.08% | 7.9×10^{20} y | β^{−}β^{−} | ^{130}Xe |

Tellurium is a chemical element; it has the symbol Te and atomic number 52. It is a brittle, mildly toxic, rare, silver-white metalloid. Tellurium is chemically related to selenium and sulfur, all three of which are chalcogens. It is occasionally found in its native form as elemental crystals. Tellurium is far more common in the universe as a whole than on Earth. Its extreme rarity in the Earth's crust, comparable to that of platinum, is due partly to its formation of a volatile hydride that caused tellurium to be lost to space as a gas during the hot nebular formation of Earth.

Tellurium-bearing compounds were first discovered in 1782 in a gold mine in Kleinschlatten, Transylvania (now Zlatna, Romania) by Austrian mineralogist Franz-Joseph Müller von Reichenstein, although it was Martin Heinrich Klaproth who named the new element in 1798 after the Latin tellus 'earth'. Gold telluride minerals are the most notable natural gold compounds. However, they are not a commercially significant source of tellurium itself, which is normally extracted as a by-product of copper and lead production.

Commercially, the primary use of tellurium is CdTe solar panels and thermoelectric devices. A more traditional application in copper (tellurium copper) and steel alloys, where tellurium improves machinability, also consumes a considerable portion of tellurium production.

Tellurium has almost no biological function, although fungi can use it in place of sulfur and selenium in amino acids such as tellurocysteine and telluromethionine. In humans, tellurium is partly metabolized into dimethyl telluride, (CH_{3})_{2}Te, a gas with a garlic-like odor exhaled in the breath of victims of tellurium exposure or poisoning.

== Characteristics ==
=== Physical properties ===
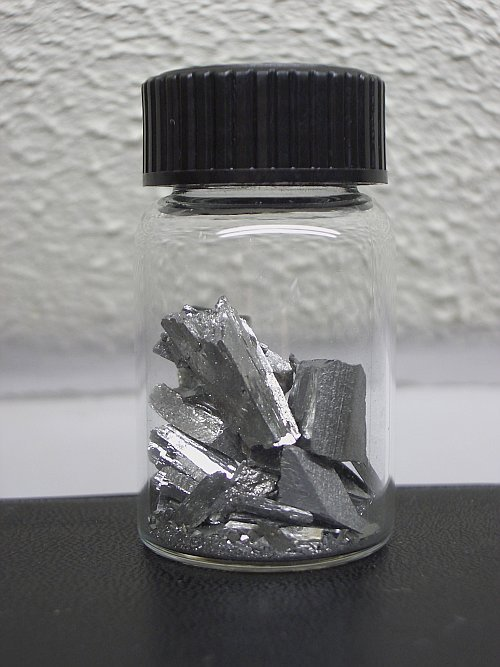
Pieces of tellurium in a vial

Tellurium has two allotropes, crystalline and amorphous. When crystalline, tellurium is silvery-white with a metallic luster. The crystals are trigonal and chiral (space group 152 or 154 depending on the chirality), like the gray form of selenium. It is a brittle and easily pulverized metalloid. Amorphous tellurium is a black-brown powder prepared by precipitating it from a solution of tellurous acid or telluric acid (Te(OH)_{6}). Tellurium is a semiconductor that shows greater electrical conductivity in certain directions depending on atomic alignment; the conductivity increases slightly when exposed to light (photoconductivity). When molten, tellurium is corrosive to copper, iron, and stainless steel. Of the chalcogens (oxygen-family elements), tellurium has the highest melting and boiling points, at 722.66 and 1,261 K (449.51 and 987.85 °C), respectively.

=== Chemical properties ===
Crystalline tellurium consists of parallel helical chains of Te atoms, with three atoms per turn. This gray material resists oxidation by air and is not volatile.

=== Isotopes ===
Naturally occurring tellurium has eight isotopes. Six of those isotopes, ^{120}Te, ^{122}Te, ^{123}Te, ^{124}Te, ^{125}Te, and ^{126}Te, are stable. The other two, ^{128}Te and ^{130}Te, are slightly radioactive, with extremely long half-lives, including 2.2 × 10^{24} years for ^{128}Te. This is the longest known half-life among all radionuclides and is about 160 trillion (10^{12}) times the age of the known universe. Electron capture decay should occur for ^{123}Te, but is still unobserved.

A further 31 artificial radioisotopes of tellurium are known, with atomic masses ranging from 104 to 142 and with half-lives up to 19.31 days for ^{121}Te. Also, 17 nuclear isomers are known, with half-lives up to 164.7 days for the same isotope. Except for beryllium-8 and beta-delayed alpha emission branches in some lighter nuclides, tellurium (^{104}Te to ^{109}Te) is the lightest element with isotopes known to undergo alpha decay.

The atomic mass of tellurium (127.60 g·mol^{−1}) exceeds that of iodine (126.90 g·mol^{−1}), the next element in the periodic table. Such inversions were thought by some to be paradoxical before atomic number was discovered.

=== Occurrence ===
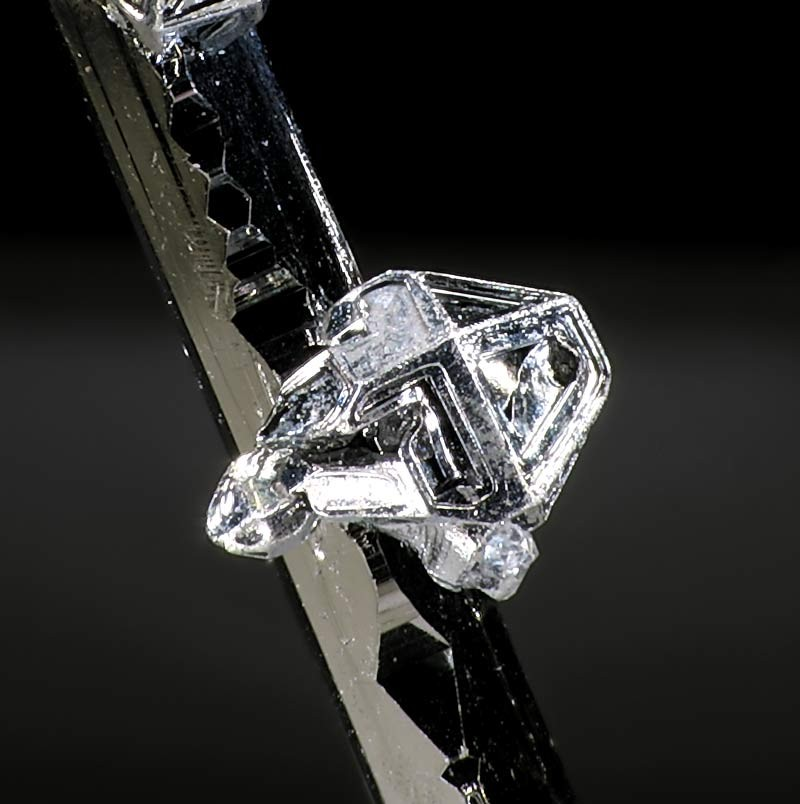
Native tellurium crystal on sylvanite (Vatukoula, Viti Levu, Fiji). Picture width 2 mm.

With an abundance in the Earth's crust comparable to that of platinum (about 1 μg/kg), tellurium is one of the rarest stable solid elements. In comparison, even thulium – the rarest of the stable lanthanides – has crystal abundances of 500 μg/kg (see Abundance of the chemical elements).

The rarity of tellurium in the Earth's crust is not a reflection of its cosmic abundance. Tellurium is more abundant than rubidium in the cosmos, though rubidium is 10,000 times more abundant in the Earth's crust. The rarity of tellurium on Earth is thought to be caused by conditions during preaccretional sorting in the solar nebula, when the stable form of certain elements, in the absence of oxygen and water, was controlled by the reductive power of free hydrogen. Under this scenario, certain elements that form volatile hydrides, such as tellurium, were severely depleted through the evaporation of these hydrides. Tellurium and selenium are the heavy elements most depleted by this process.

Tellurium is sometimes found in its native (i.e., elemental) form, but is more often found as the tellurides of gold such as calaverite and krennerite (two different polymorphs of AuTe_{2}), petzite, Ag_{3}AuTe_{2}, and sylvanite, AgAuTe_{4}. The town of Telluride, Colorado, was named in the hope of a strike of gold telluride (which never materialized, though gold metal ore was found). Gold itself is usually found uncombined, but when found as a chemical compound, it is often combined with tellurium.

Although tellurium is found with gold more often than in uncombined form, it is found even more often combined as tellurides of more common metals (e.g. melonite, NiTe_{2}). Natural tellurite and tellurate minerals also occur, formed by the oxidation of tellurides near the Earth's surface. In contrast to selenium, tellurium does not usually replace sulfur in minerals because of the great difference in ion radii. Thus, many common sulfide minerals contain substantial quantities of selenium and only traces of tellurium.

In the gold rush of 1893, miners in Kalgoorlie discarded a pyritic material as they searched for pure gold, and it was used to fill in potholes and build sidewalks. In 1896, that tailing was discovered to be calaverite, a telluride of gold, and it sparked a second gold rush that included mining the streets.

In 2023 astronomers detected the creation of tellurium during a neutron star merger.

== History ==
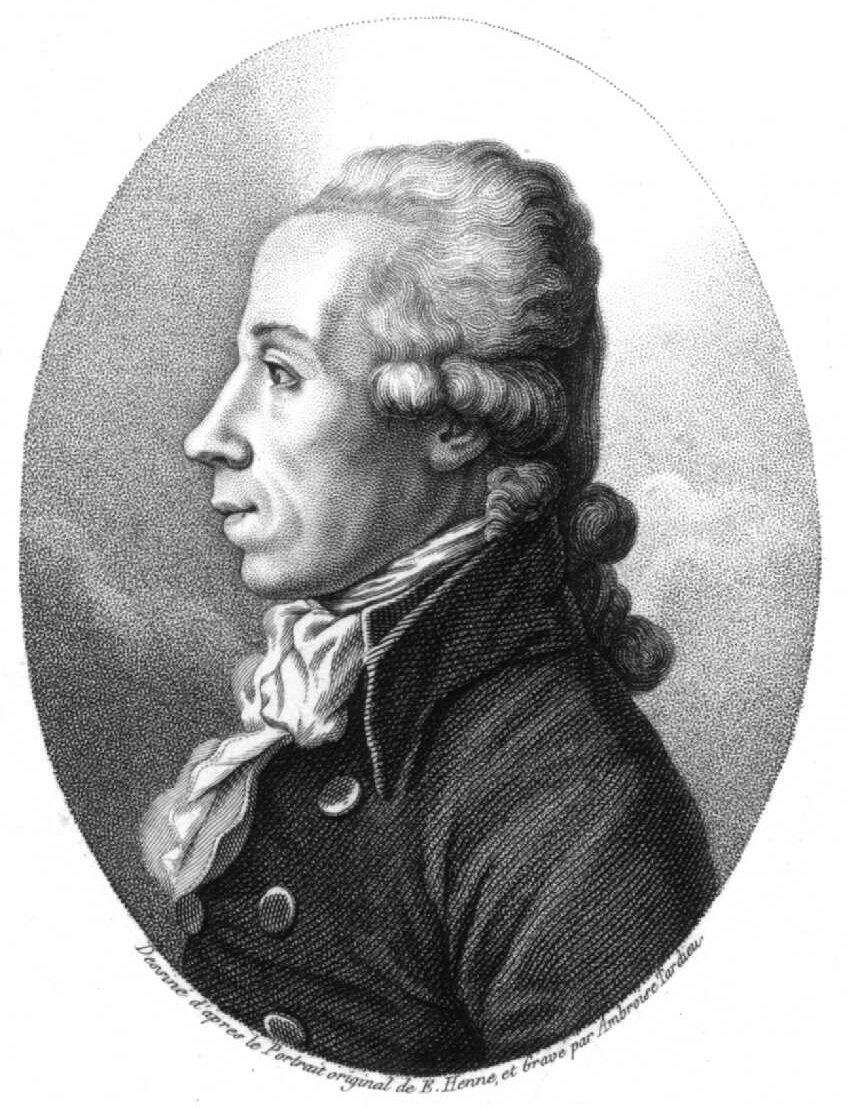
Klaproth named the new element and credited von Reichenstein with its discovery

Tellurium (Latin tellus meaning "earth") was discovered in the 18th century in a gold ore from the mines in Kleinschlatten (today Zlatna), near today's city of Alba Iulia, Romania. This ore was known as "Faczebajer weißes blättriges Golderz" (white leafy gold ore from Faczebaja, German name of Facebánya, now Fața Băii in Alba County) or antimonalischer Goldkies (antimonic gold pyrite), and according to Anton von Rupprecht, was Spießglaskönig (argent molybdique), containing native antimony. In 1782 Franz-Joseph Müller von Reichenstein, who was then serving as the Austrian chief inspector of mines in Transylvania, concluded that the ore did not contain antimony but was bismuth sulfide. The following year, he reported that this was erroneous and that the ore contained mostly gold and an unknown metal very similar to antimony. After a thorough investigation that lasted three years and included more than fifty tests, Müller determined the specific gravity of the mineral and noted that when heated, the new metal gives off a white smoke with a radish-like odor; that it imparts a red color to sulfuric acid; and that when this solution is diluted with water, it has a black precipitate. Nevertheless, he was not able to identify this metal and gave it the names aurum paradoxum (paradoxical gold) and metallum problematicum (problem metal), because it did not exhibit the properties predicted for antimony.

In 1789, a Hungarian scientist, Pál Kitaibel, discovered the element independently in an ore from Deutsch-Pilsen that had been regarded as argentiferous molybdenite, but later he gave the credit to Müller. In 1798, it was named by Martin Heinrich Klaproth, who had earlier isolated it from the mineral calaverite.

In the early 1920s, Thomas Midgley Jr. found tellurium prevented engine knocking when added to fuel, but ruled it out due to the difficult-to-eradicate smell. Midgley went on to discover and popularize the use of tetraethyl lead.

The 1960s brought an increase in thermoelectric applications for tellurium (as bismuth telluride), and in free-machining steel alloys, which became the dominant use. These applications were overtaken by the growing importance of CdTe in thin-film solar cells in the 2000s.

== Production ==
Most Te (and Se) is obtained from porphyry copper deposits, where it occurs in trace amounts. The element is recovered from anode sludges from the electrolytic refining of blister copper. It is a component of dusts from blast furnace refining of lead. Treatment of 1000 tons of copper ore yields approximately one kilogram (2.2 pounds) of tellurium.

The anode sludges contain the selenides and tellurides of the noble metals in compounds with the formula M_{2}Se or M_{2}Te (M = Cu, Ag, Au). At temperatures of 500 °C the anode sludges are roasted with sodium carbonate under air. The metal ions are reduced to the metals, while the telluride is converted to sodium tellurite.

M_{2}Te + O_{2} + Na_{2}CO_{3} → Na_{2}TeO_{3} + 2 M + CO_{2}

Tellurites can be leached from the mixture with water and are normally present as hydrotellurites HTeO_{3}^{−} in solution. Selenites are also formed during this process, but they can be separated by adding sulfuric acid. The hydrotellurites are converted into the insoluble tellurium dioxide while the selenites stay in solution.

HTeO_{3}^{−} + OH^{−} + H_{2}SO_{4} → TeO_{2} + SO_{4}^{2−} + 2 H_{2}O

The metal is produced from the oxide (reduced) either by electrolysis or by reacting the tellurium dioxide with sulfur dioxide in sulfuric acid.

TeO_{2} + 2 SO_{2} + 2 H_{2}O → Te + 2 SO_{4}^{2−} + 4 H^{+}

Commercial-grade tellurium is usually marketed as 200-mesh powder but is also available as slabs, ingots, sticks, or lumps. The year-end price for tellurium in 2000 was US$30 per kilogram. In recent years, the tellurium price was driven up by increased demand and limited supply, reaching as high as US$220 per pound in 2006. The average annual price for 99.99%-pure tellurium increased from $38 per kilogram in 2017 to $74 per kilogram in 2018. Despite the expectation that improved production methods will double production, the United States Department of Energy (DoE) anticipates a supply shortfall of tellurium by 2025.

In the 2020s, China produced ca. 50% of world's tellurium and was the only country that mined Te as the main target rather than a by-product. This dominance was driven by the rapid expansion of solar cell industry in China. In 2022, the largest Te providers by volume were China (340 tonnes), Russia (80 t), Japan (70 t), Canada (50 t), Uzbekistan (50 t), Sweden (40 t) and the United States (no official data).

== Compounds ==
Tellurium belongs to the chalcogen (group 16) family of elements on the periodic table, which also includes oxygen, sulfur, selenium and polonium: Tellurium and selenium compounds are similar. Tellurium exhibits the oxidation states −2, +2, +4 and +6, with +4 being most common.

=== Tellurides ===
Reduction of Te metal produces the tellurides and polytellurides, Te_{n}^{2−}. The −2 oxidation state is exhibited in binary compounds with many metals, such as zinc telluride, ZnTe, produced by heating tellurium with zinc. Decomposition of ZnTe with hydrochloric acid yields hydrogen telluride (H_{2}Te), a highly unstable analogue of the other chalcogen hydrides, H_{2}O, H_{2}S and H_{2}Se:

ZnTe + 2 HCl → ZnCl_{2} + H_{2}Te

=== Halides ===
The +2 oxidation state is exhibited by the dihalides, TeCl_{2}, TeBr_{2} and TeI_{2}. The dihalides have not been obtained in pure form, although they are known decomposition products of the tetrahalides in organic solvents, and the derived tetrahalotellurates are well-characterized:

Te + X_{2} + 2 X^{−} → TeX_{4}^{2−}

where X is Cl, Br, or I. These anions are square planar in geometry. Polynuclear anionic species also exist, such as the dark brown Te_{2}I_{6}^{2−}, and the black Te_{4}I_{14}^{2−}.

With fluorine Te forms the mixed-valence Te_{2}F_{4} and TeF_{6}. In the +6 oxidation state, the −OTeF_{5} structural group occurs in a number of compounds such as HOTeF_{5}, B(OTeF_{5})_{3}, Xe(OTeF_{5})_{2}, Te(OTeF_{5})_{4} and Te(OTeF_{5})_{6}. The square antiprismatic anion TeF_{8}^{2−} is also attested. The other halogens do not form halides with tellurium in the +6 oxidation state, but only tetrahalides (TeCl_{4}, TeBr_{4} and TeI_{4}) in the +4 state, and other lower halides (Te_{3}Cl_{2}, Te_{2}Cl_{2}, Te_{2}Br_{2}, Te_{2}I and two forms of TeI). In the +4 oxidation state, halotellurate anions are known, such as TeCl_{6}^{2−} and Te_{2}Cl_{10}^{2−}. Halotellurium cations are also attested, including TeI_{3}^{+}, found in TeI_{3}AsF_{6}.

=== Oxocompounds ===
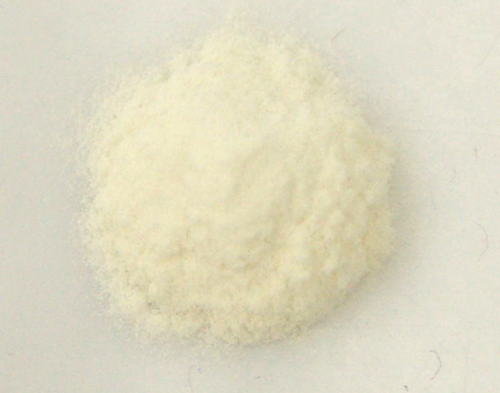
A sample of tellurium dioxide powder

Tellurium monoxide was first reported in 1883 as a black amorphous solid formed by the heat decomposition of TeSO_{3} in vacuum, disproportionating into tellurium dioxide, TeO_{2} and elemental tellurium upon heating. Since then, however, existence in the solid phase is doubted and in dispute, although it is known as a vapor fragment; the black solid may be merely an equimolar mixture of elemental tellurium and tellurium dioxide.

Tellurium dioxide is formed by heating tellurium in air, where it burns with a blue flame. Tellurium trioxide, β-TeO_{3}, is obtained by thermal decomposition of Te(OH)_{6}. The other two forms of trioxide reported in the literature, the α- and γ- forms, were found not to be true oxides of tellurium in the +6 oxidation state, but a mixture of Te^{4+}, OH^{−} and O_{2}^{−}. Tellurium also exhibits mixed-valence oxides, Te_{2}O_{5} and Te_{4}O_{9}.

The tellurium oxides and hydrated oxides form a series of acids, including tellurous acid (H_{2}TeO_{3}), orthotelluric acid (Te(OH)_{6}) and metatelluric acid ((H_{2}TeO_{4})_{n}). The two forms of telluric acid form tellurate salts containing the TeO_{4}^{2−} and TeO_{6}^{6−} anions, respectively. Tellurous acid forms tellurite salts containing the anion TeO_{3}^{2−}.

=== Zintl cations ===
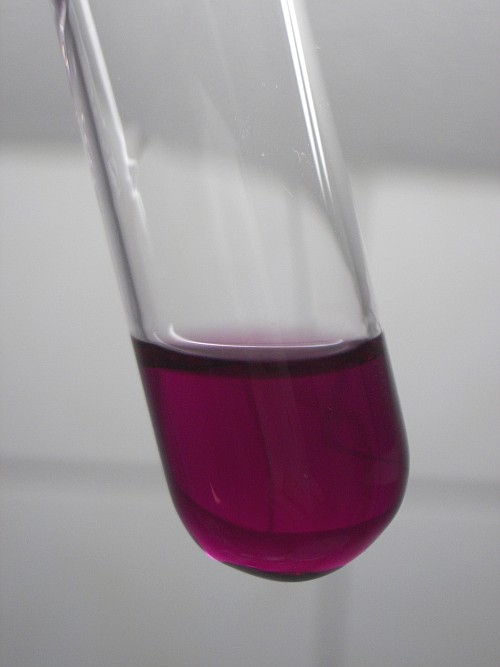
A solution of Te_{4}^{2+}

When tellurium is treated with concentrated sulfuric acid, the result is a red solution of the Zintl ion, Te_{4}^{2+}. The oxidation of tellurium by AsF_{5} in liquid SO_{2} produces the same square planar cation, in addition to the trigonal prismatic, yellow-orange Te_{6}^{4+}:

4 Te + 3 AsF_{5} → Te_{4}^{2+}(AsF_{6}^{−})_{2} + AsF_{3}
6 Te + 6 AsF_{5} → Te_{4}^{4+}(AsF_{6}^{−})_{4} + 2 AsF_{3}

Other tellurium Zintl cations include the polymeric Te_{7}^{2+} and the blue-black Te_{8}^{2+}, consisting of two fused 5-membered tellurium rings. The latter cation is formed by the reaction of tellurium with tungsten hexachloride:

8 Te + 2 WCl_{6} → Te_{4}^{2+}(WCl_{6}^{−})_{2}

Interchalcogen cations also exist, such as Te_{2}Se_{6}^{2+} (distorted cubic geometry) and Te_{2}Se_{8}^{2+}. These are formed by oxidizing mixtures of tellurium and selenium with AsF_{5} or SbF_{5}.

=== Organotellurium compounds ===
Tellurium does not readily form analogues of alcohols and thiols, with the functional group –TeH, that are called tellurols. The –TeH functional group is also attributed using the prefix tellanyl-. Like H_{2}Te, these species are unstable with respect to loss of hydrogen. Telluraethers (R–Te–R) are more stable, as are telluroxides.

== Applications ==
In 2022, the major applications of tellurium were thin-film solar cells (40%), thermoelectrics (30%), metallurgy (15%), and rubber (5%), with the first two applications experiencing a rapid increase owing to the worldwide tendency of reducing dependence on fossil fuels. In metallurgy, tellurium is added to iron, stainless steel, copper, and lead alloys. It improves the machinability of copper without reducing its high electrical conductivity. It increases resistance to vibration and fatigue of lead and stabilizes various carbides and in malleable iron.

=== Heterogeneous catalysis ===
Tellurium oxides are components of commercial oxidation catalysts. Te-containing catalysts are used for the ammoxidation route to acrylonitrile (CH_{2}=CH–C≡N):

2 CH_{3}−CH=CH_{2} + 2 NH_{3} + 3 O_{2} → 2 CH_{2}=CH–C≡N + 6 H_{2}O

Related catalysts are used in the production of tetramethylene glycol:

CH_{3}CH_{2}CH_{2}CH_{3} + O_{2} → HOCH_{2}CH_{2}CH_{2}CH_{2}OH

=== Niche ===
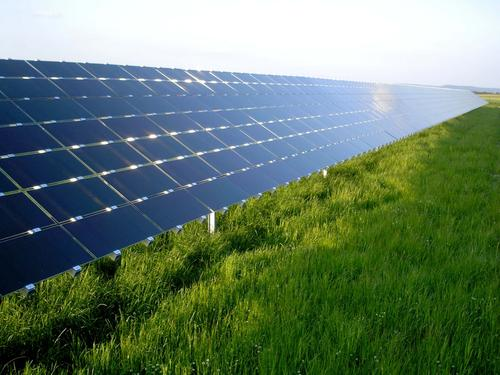
A CdTe photovoltaic array

- Synthetic rubber vulcanized with tellurium shows mechanical and thermal properties that in some ways are superior to sulfur-vulcanized materials.
- Tellurium compounds are specialized pigments for ceramics.
- Selenides and tellurides greatly increase the optical refraction of glass widely used in glass optical fibers for telecommunications.
- Mixtures of selenium and tellurium are used with barium peroxide as an oxidizer in the delay powder of electric blasting caps.
- Neutron bombardment of tellurium is the most common way to produce iodine-131. This in turn is used to treat some thyroid conditions, and as a tracer compound in hydraulic fracturing, among other applications.

=== Semiconductor and electronic ===
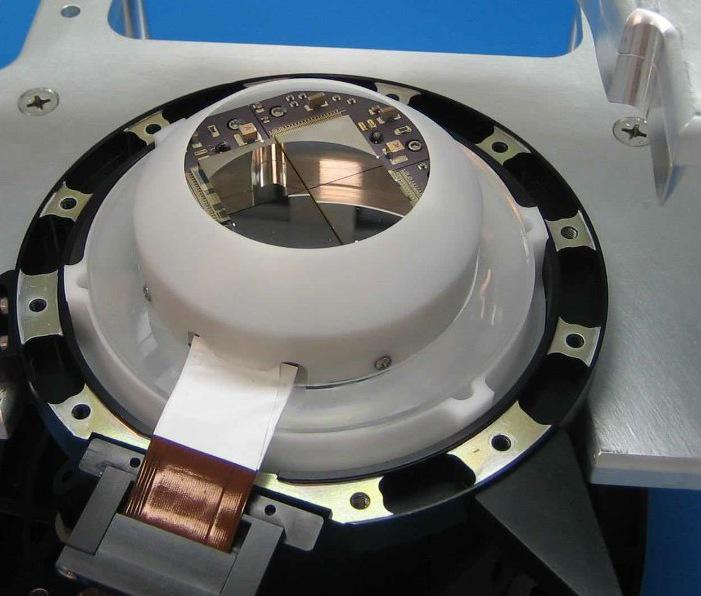
A (Cd,Zn)Te detector from the NuSTAR NASA X-ray telescope

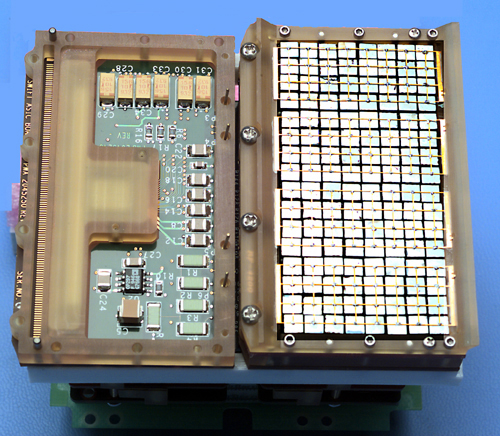
An array of (Cd,Zn)Te X-ray detectors from the Burst Alert Telescope of the NASA Neil Gehrels Swift Observatory

Cadmium telluride (CdTe) solar panels exhibit some of the greatest efficiencies for solar cell electric power generators.

In 2018, China installed thin-film solar panels with a total power output of 175 GW, more than any other country in the world; most of those panels were made of CdTe. In June 2022, China set goals of generating 25% of energy consumption and installing 1.2 billion kilowatts of capacity for wind and solar power by 2030. This proposal will increase the demand for tellurium and its production worldwide, especially in China, where the annual volumes of Te refining increased from 280 tonnes in 2017 to 340 tonnes in 2022.

(Cd,Zn)Te is an efficient material for detecting X-rays. It is being used in the NASA space-based X-ray telescope NuSTAR.

Mercury cadmium telluride is a semiconductor material that is used in thermal imaging devices.

=== Organotellurium compounds ===
Organotellurium compounds are mainly of interest in the research context. Several have been examined such as precursors for metalorganic vapor phase epitaxy growth of II-VI compound semiconductors. These precursor compounds include dimethyl telluride, diethyl telluride, diisopropyl telluride, diallyl telluride, and methyl allyl telluride. Diisopropyl telluride (DIPTe) is the preferred precursor for low-temperature growth of CdHgTe by MOVPE. The greatest purity metalorganics of both selenium and tellurium are used in these processes. The compounds for semiconductor industry and are prepared by adduct purification.

Tellurium suboxide is used in the media layer of rewritable optical discs, including ReWritable Compact Discs (CD-RW), ReWritable Digital Video Discs (DVD-RW), and ReWritable Blu-ray Discs.

Tellurium is used in the phase change memory chips developed by Intel. Bismuth telluride (Bi_{2}Te_{3}) and lead telluride are working elements of thermoelectric devices. Lead telluride exhibits promise in far-infrared detectors.

=== Photocathodes ===
Tellurium shows up in a number of photocathodes used in solar blind photomultiplier tubes and for high brightness photoinjectors driving modern particle accelerators. The photocathode Cs-Te, which is predominantly Cs_{2}Te, has a photoemission threshold of 3.5 eV and exhibits the uncommon combination of high quantum efficiency (>10%) and high durability in poor vacuum environments (lasting for months under use in RF electron guns). This has made it the go to choice for photoemission electron guns used in driving free electron lasers. In this application, it is usually driven at the wavelength 267 nm which is the third harmonic of commonly used Ti-sapphire lasers. More Te containing photocathodes have been grown using other alkali metals such as rubidium, potassium, and sodium, but they have not found the same popularity that Cs-Te has enjoyed.

=== Thermoelectric material ===
Tellurium itself can be used as a high-performance elemental thermoelectric material. A trigonal Te with the space group of P3_{1}21 can transfer into a topological insulator phase, which is suitable for thermoelectric material. Though often not considered as a thermoelectric material alone, polycrystalline tellurium does show great thermoelectric performance with the thermoelectric figure of merit, zT, as high as 1.0, which is even higher than some of other conventional TE materials like SiGe and BiSb.

Telluride, which is a compound form of tellurium, is a more common TE material. Typical and ongoing research includes Bi_{2}Te_{3}, and La_{3−x}Te_{4}, etc. Bi_{2}Te_{3} is widely used from energy conversion to sensing to cooling due to its great TE properties. The BiTe-based TE material can achieve a conversion efficiency of 8%, an average zT value of 1.05 for p-type and 0.84 for n-type bismuth telluride alloys. Lanthanum telluride can be potentially used in deep space as a thermoelectric generator due to the huge temperature difference in space. The zT value reaches to a maximum of ~1.0 for a La_{3−x}Te_{4} system with x near 0.2. This composition also allows other chemical substitution which may enhance the TE performance. The addition of Yb, for example, may increase the zT value from 1.0 to 1.2 at 1275 K, which is greater than the current SiGe power system.

== Biological role ==
Tellurium has no known biological function, although fungi can incorporate it in place of sulfur and selenium into amino acids such as tellurocysteine and telluromethionine. Organisms have shown a highly variable tolerance to tellurium compounds. Many bacteria, such as Pseudomonas aeruginosa and Gayadomonas sp, take up tellurite and reduce it to elemental tellurium, which accumulates and causes a characteristic and often dramatic darkening of cells. In yeast, this reduction is mediated by the sulfate assimilation pathway. Tellurium accumulation seems to account for a major part of the toxicity effects. Some species metabolize tellurium to form dimethyl telluride or dimethyl ditelluride. Dimethyl telluride has been observed in hot springs at very low concentrations.

Tellurite agar is used to identify members of the corynebacterium genus, most typically Corynebacterium diphtheriae, the pathogen responsible for diphtheria.

== Precautions ==
Tellurium
Hazards
- GHS labelling
| Pictograms | (GHS06: Toxic) (GHS07: Exclamation mark) (GHS08: Health hazard) |
| Signal word | Danger |
| Hazard statements | H301, H317, H319, H332, H335, H360, H362, H412 |
| Precautionary statements | P201, P261, P280, P308+P313 |
| NFPA 704 (fire diamond) | 2 0 0 |

Tellurium and tellurium compounds are considered to be mildly toxic and need to be handled with care, although acute poisoning is rare. Tellurium poisoning is particularly difficult to treat as many chelation agents used in the treatment of metal poisoning will increase the toxicity of tellurium. Tellurium is not reported to be carcinogenic, but it may be fatal if inhaled, swallowed, or absorbed through skin.

Humans exposed to as little as 0.01 mg/m^{3} or less in air exude a foul garlic-like odor known as "tellurium breath". This is caused by the body converting tellurium from any oxidation state to dimethyl telluride, (CH_{3})_{2}Te, a volatile compound with a pungent garlic-like smell. Volunteers given 15 mg of tellurium still had this characteristic smell on their breath eight months later. In laboratories, this odor makes it possible to discern which scientists are responsible for tellurium chemistry, and even which books they have handled in the past. Even though the metabolic pathways of tellurium are not known, it is generally assumed that they resemble those of the more extensively studied selenium because the final methylated metabolic products of the two elements are similar.

People can be exposed to tellurium in the workplace by inhalation, ingestion, skin contact, and eye contact. The Occupational Safety and Health Administration (OSHA) limits (permissible exposure limit) tellurium exposure in the workplace to 0.1 mg/m^{3} over an eight-hour workday. The National Institute for Occupational Safety and Health (NIOSH) has set the recommended exposure limit (REL) at 0.1 mg/m^{3} over an eight-hour workday. In concentrations of 25 mg/m^{3}, tellurium is immediately dangerous to life and health.

== See also ==
- The 1862 telluric helix of Alexandre-Émile Béguyer de Chancourtois.

== Cited sources ==
- Greenwood, N. N. & Earnshaw, A. (1997). Chemistry of the Elements (2nd ed.). Oxford: Butterworth-Heinemann. ISBN 978-0-7506-3365-9.
