= Chalcogen =

Group of chemical elements

Chalcogens
Hydrogen																															Helium
Lithium	Beryllium																									Boron	Carbon	Nitrogen	Oxygen	Fluorine	Neon
Sodium	Magnesium																									Aluminium	Silicon	Phosphorus	Sulfur	Chlorine	Argon
Potassium	Calcium															Scandium	Titanium	Vanadium	Chromium	Manganese	Iron	Cobalt	Nickel	Copper	Zinc	Gallium	Germanium	Arsenic	Selenium	Bromine	Krypton
Rubidium	Strontium															Yttrium	Zirconium	Niobium	Molybdenum	Technetium	Ruthenium	Rhodium	Palladium	Silver	Cadmium	Indium	Tin	Antimony	Tellurium	Iodine	Xenon
Caesium	Barium	Lanthanum	Cerium	Praseodymium	Neodymium	Promethium	Samarium	Europium	Gadolinium	Terbium	Dysprosium	Holmium	Erbium	Thulium	Ytterbium	Lutetium	Hafnium	Tantalum	Tungsten	Rhenium	Osmium	Iridium	Platinum	Gold	Mercury (element)	Thallium	Lead	Bismuth	Polonium	Astatine	Radon
Francium	Radium	Actinium	Thorium	Protactinium	Uranium	Neptunium	Plutonium	Americium	Curium	Berkelium	Californium	Einsteinium	Fermium	Mendelevium	Nobelium	Lawrencium	Rutherfordium	Dubnium	Seaborgium	Bohrium	Hassium	Meitnerium	Darmstadtium	Roentgenium	Copernicium	Nihonium	Flerovium	Moscovium	Livermorium	Tennessine	Oganesson
pnictogens ← → halogens
IUPAC group number	16
Name by element	oxygen group
Trivial name	chalcogens
CAS group number (US, pattern A-B-A)	VIA
old IUPAC number (Europe, pattern A-B)	VIB

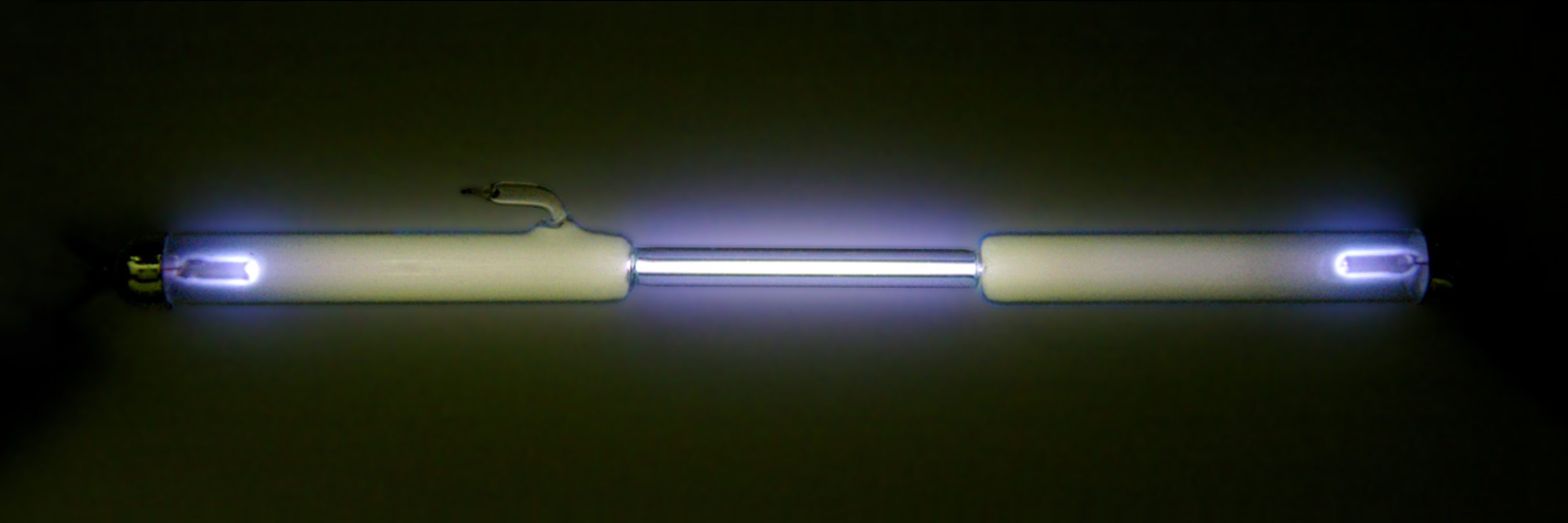
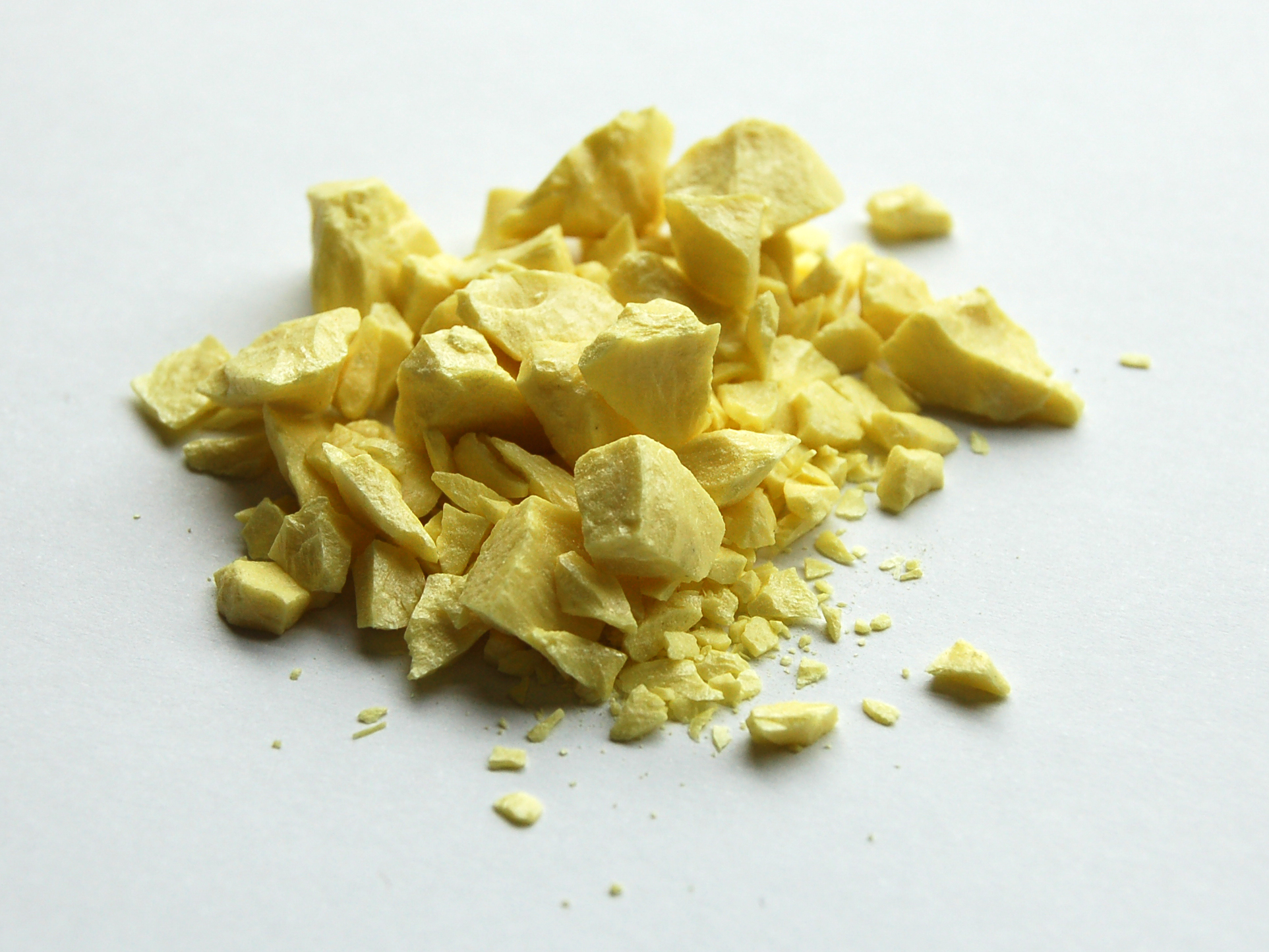
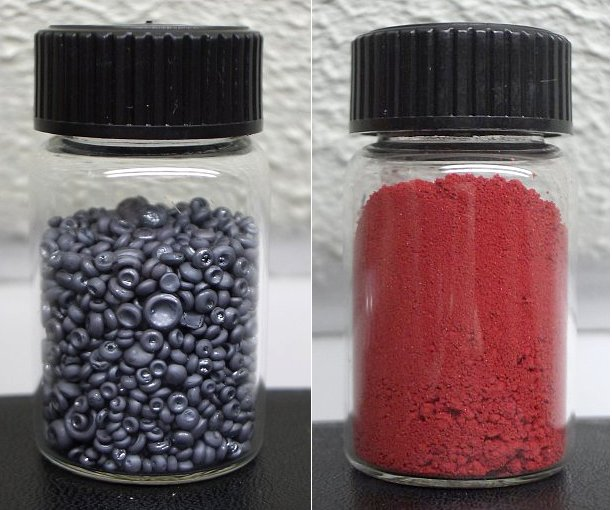
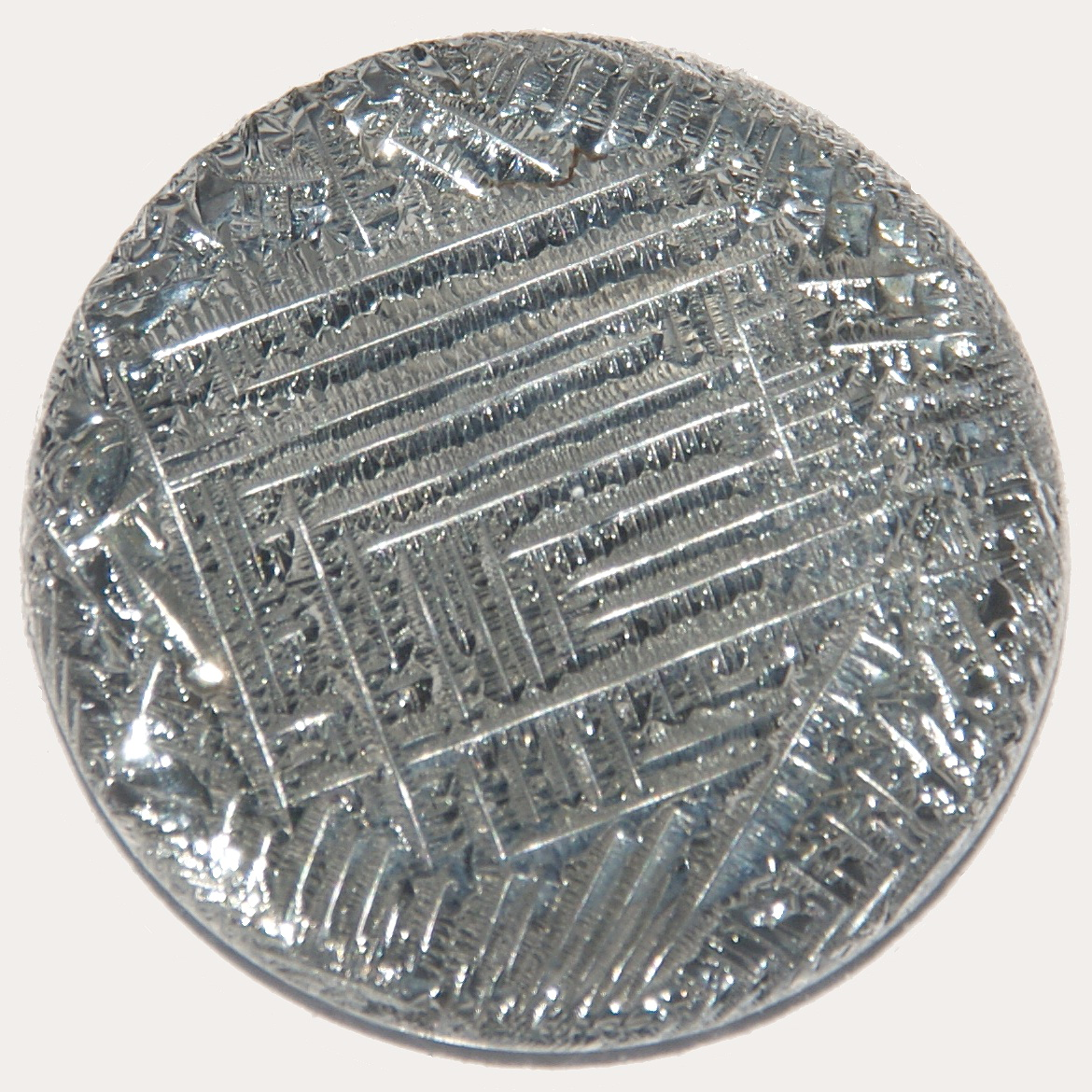
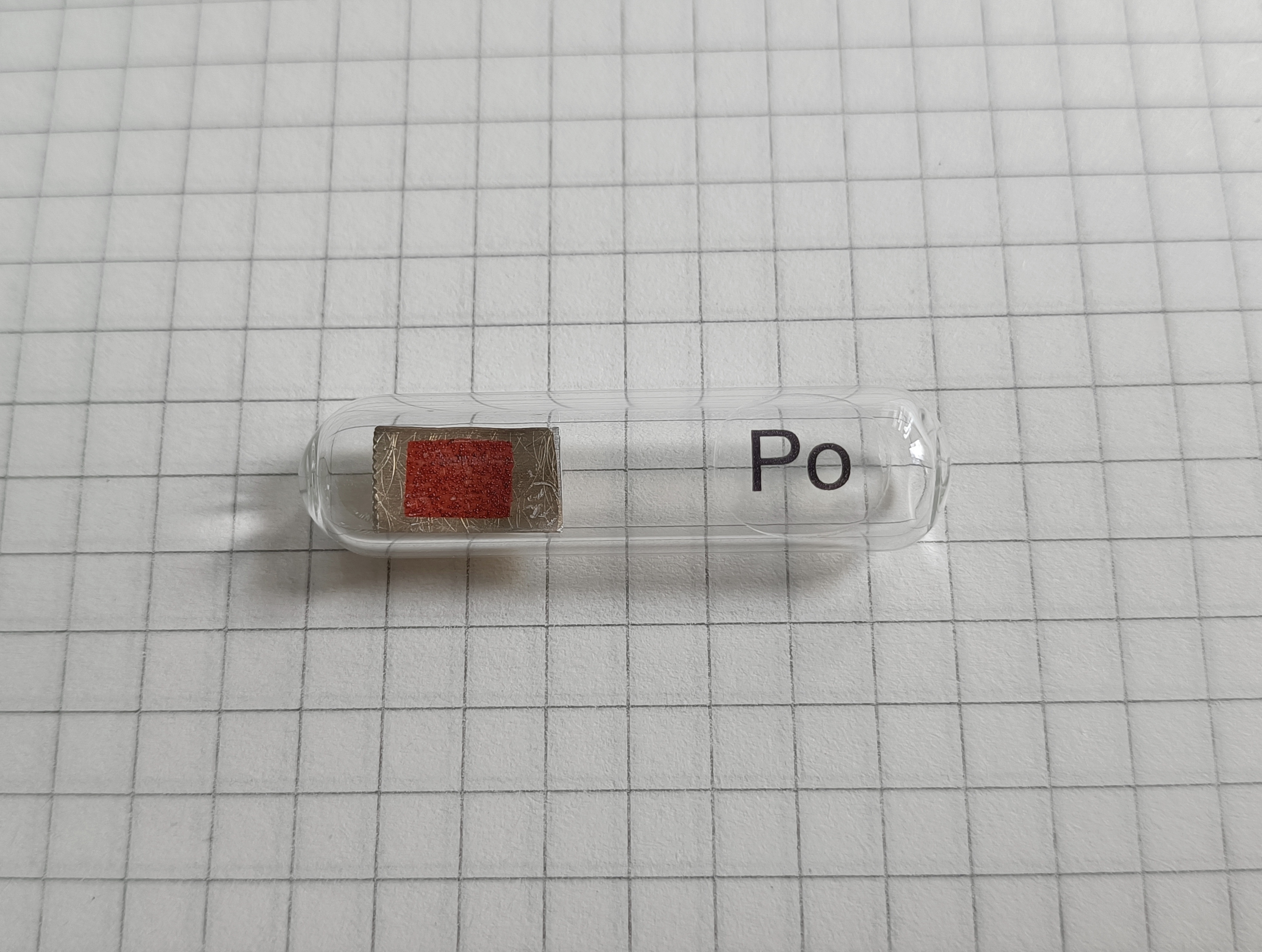
↓ Period
2	Oxygen (O); 8 Other nonmetal
3	Sulfur (S); 16 Other nonmetal
4	Selenium (Se); 34 Other nonmetal
5	Tellurium (Te); 52 Metalloid
6	Polonium (Po); 84 Other metal
7	Livermorium (Lv); 116 Other metal
Legend primordial element naturally occurring by radioactive decay synthetic element

The chalcogens (/ˈkælkədʒənz/, KAL-kə-jənz) are the chemical elements in group 16 of the periodic table. This group is also known as the oxygen family. Group 16 consists of the elements oxygen (O), sulfur (S), selenium (Se), tellurium (Te), and the radioactive elements polonium (Po) and livermorium (Lv). Often, oxygen is treated separately from the other chalcogens, sometimes even excluded from the scope of the term "chalcogen" altogether, due to its very different chemical behavior from sulfur, selenium, tellurium, and polonium. The word "chalcogen" means "ore-forming"; chalcogens got their name because protoscientists and early scientists could discern that these essences (which science would later reveal to be chemical elements) were involved in ore formation.

Sulfur has been known since antiquity, and oxygen was recognized as an element in the 18th century. Selenium, tellurium and polonium were discovered in the 19th century, and livermorium in 2000. All of the chalcogens have six valence electrons, leaving them two electrons short of a full outer shell. Their most common oxidation states are −2, +2, +4, and +6. They have relatively small atomic radii, especially the lighter ones.

All of the naturally occurring chalcogens have some role in biological functions, either as a nutrient or a toxin. Selenium is an important nutrient (among others as a building block of selenocysteine) but is also commonly toxic. Tellurium often has unpleasant effects (although some organisms can use it), and polonium (especially the isotope polonium-210) is always harmful as a result of its radioactivity.

Sulfur has more than 20 allotropes, oxygen has nine, selenium has at least eight, polonium has two, and only one crystal structure of tellurium has so far been discovered. There are numerous organic chalcogen compounds. Not counting oxygen, organic sulfur compounds are generally the most common, followed by organic selenium compounds and organic tellurium compounds. This trend also occurs with chalcogen pnictides and compounds containing chalcogens and carbon group elements.

Oxygen is generally obtained by separation of air into nitrogen and oxygen. Sulfur is extracted from oil and natural gas. Selenium and tellurium are produced as byproducts of copper refining. Polonium is most available in naturally occurring actinide-containing materials. Livermorium has been synthesized in particle accelerators. The primary use of elemental oxygen is in steelmaking. Sulfur is mostly converted into sulfuric acid, which is heavily used in the chemical industry. Selenium's most common application is glassmaking. Tellurium compounds are mostly used in optical disks, electronic devices, and solar cells. Some of polonium's applications are due to its radioactivity.

Electronic configuration

Oxygen (O): [He] 2s^{2} 2p^{4}

Sulfur (S): [Ne] 3s^{2} 3p^{4}

Selenium (Se): [Ar] 3d^{10} 4s^{2} 4p^{4}

Tellurium (Te): [Kr] 4d^{10} 5s^{2} 5p^{4}

Polonium (Po): [Xe] 4f^{14} 5d^{10} 6s^{2} 6p^{4}

Livermorium (Lv): [Rn] 5f^{14} 6d^{10} 7s^{2} 7p^{4}

== Properties ==
=== Atomic and physical ===
Chalcogens show similar patterns in electron configuration, especially in the outermost shells, where they all have the same number of valence electrons, resulting in similar trends in chemical behavior:

Z	Element	Electrons per shell
8	Oxygen	2, 6
16	Sulfur	2, 8, 6
34	Selenium	2, 8, 18, 6
52	Tellurium	2, 8, 18, 18, 6
84	Polonium	2, 8, 18, 32, 18, 6
116	Livermorium	2, 8, 18, 32, 32, 18, 6 (predicted)

Element	Melting point (°C)	Boiling point (°C)	Density at STP (g/cm^{3})
Oxygen	−219	−183	0.00143
Sulfur	120	445	2.07
Selenium	221	685	4.3
Tellurium	450	988	6.24
Polonium	254	962	9.2
Livermorium	364–507 (predicted)	762–862 (predicted)	14 (predicted)

All chalcogens have six valence electrons. All of the solid, stable chalcogens are soft and do not conduct heat well. Electronegativity decreases towards the chalcogens with higher atomic numbers. Density, melting and boiling points, and atomic and ionic radii tend to increase towards the chalcogens with higher atomic numbers.

=== Isotopes ===
Out of the six known chalcogens, one (oxygen) has an atomic number equal to a nuclear magic number, which means that their atomic nuclei tend to have increased stability against radioactive decay. Oxygen has three stable isotopes, and 14 unstable ones. Sulfur has four stable isotopes, 20 radioactive ones, and one isomer. Selenium has six observationally stable or nearly stable isotopes, 26 radioactive isotopes, and 9 isomers. Tellurium has eight stable or nearly stable isotopes, 31 unstable ones, and 17 isomers. Polonium has 42 isotopes, none of which are stable. It has an additional 28 isomers. In addition to the stable isotopes, some radioactive chalcogen isotopes occur in nature, either because they are decay products, such as ^{210}Po, because they are primordial, such as ^{82}Se, because of cosmic ray spallation, or via nuclear fission of uranium. Livermorium isotopes ^{288}Lv through ^{293}Lv have been discovered; the most stable livermorium isotope is ^{293}Lv, which has a half-life of 0.061 seconds.

With the exception of livermorium, all chalcogens have at least one naturally occurring radioisotope: oxygen has trace ^{15}O, sulfur has trace ^{35}S, selenium has ^{82}Se, tellurium has ^{128}Te and ^{130}Te, and polonium has ^{210}Po.

Among the lighter chalcogens (oxygen and sulfur), the most neutron-poor isotopes undergo proton emission, the moderately neutron-poor isotopes undergo electron capture or β^{+} decay, the moderately neutron-rich isotopes undergo β^{−} decay, and the most neutron rich isotopes undergo neutron emission. The middle chalcogens (selenium and tellurium) have similar decay tendencies as the lighter chalcogens, but no proton-emitting isotopes have been observed, and some of the most neutron-deficient isotopes of tellurium undergo alpha decay. Polonium isotopes tend to decay via alpha or beta decay. Isotopes with nonzero nuclear spins are more abundant in nature among the chalcogens selenium and tellurium than they are with sulfur.

=== Allotropes ===
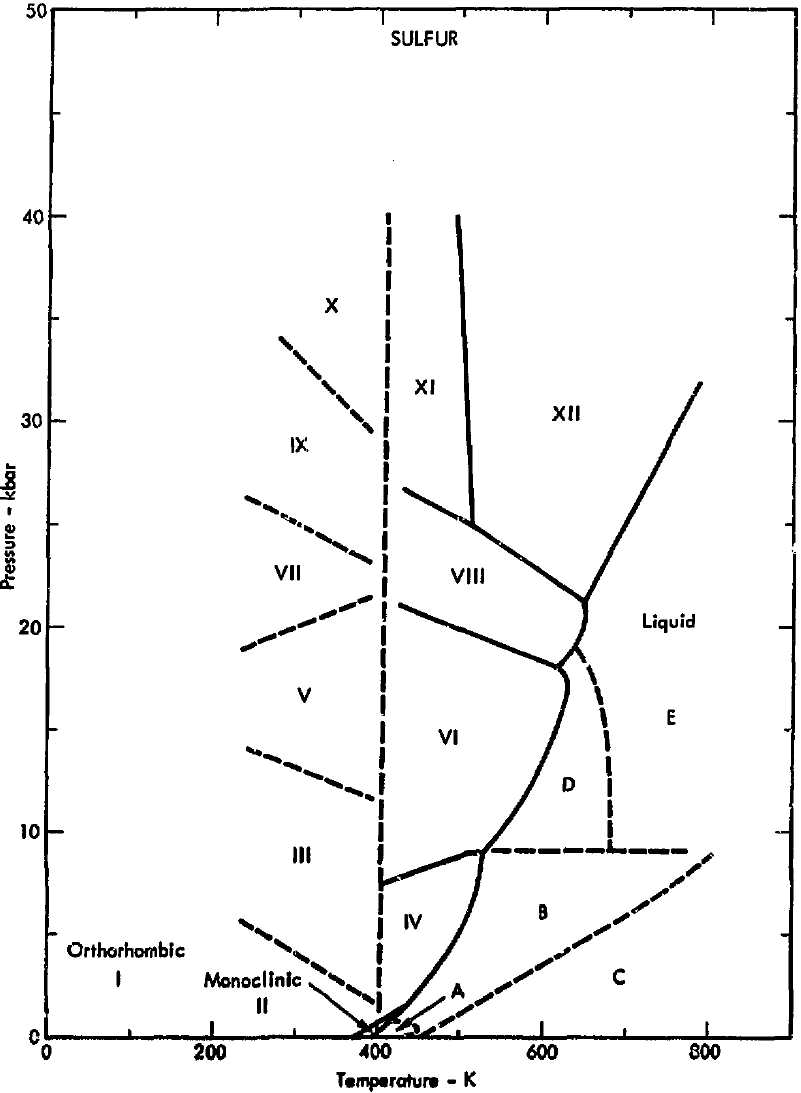
Phase diagram of sulfur showing the relative stabilities of several allotropes

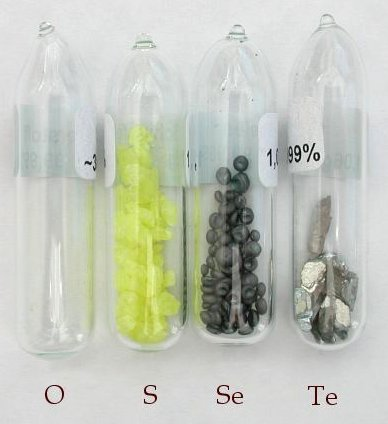
The four stable chalcogens at STP

Phase diagram for solid oxygen

Oxygen's most common allotrope is diatomic oxygen, or O_{2}, a reactive paramagnetic molecule that is ubiquitous to aerobic organisms and has a blue color in its liquid state. Another allotrope is O_{3}, or ozone, which is three oxygen atoms bonded together in a bent formation. There is also an allotrope called tetraoxygen, or O_{4}, and six allotropes of solid oxygen including "red oxygen", which has the formula O_{8}.

Sulfur has over 20 known allotropes, which is more than any other element except carbon. The most common allotropes are in the form of eight-atom rings, but other molecular allotropes that contain as few as two atoms or as many as 20 are known. Other notable sulfur allotropes include rhombic sulfur and monoclinic sulfur. Rhombic sulfur is the more stable of the two allotropes. Monoclinic sulfur takes the form of long needles and is formed when liquid sulfur is cooled to slightly below its melting point. The atoms in liquid sulfur are generally in the form of long chains, but above 190 °C, the chains begin to break down. If liquid sulfur above 190 °C is frozen very rapidly, the resulting sulfur is amorphous or "plastic" sulfur. Gaseous sulfur is a mixture of diatomic sulfur (S_{2}) and 8-atom rings.

Selenium has at least eight distinct allotropes. The gray allotrope, commonly referred to as the "metallic" allotrope, despite not being a metal, is stable and has a hexagonal crystal structure. The gray allotrope of selenium is soft, with a Mohs hardness of 2, and brittle. Four other allotropes of selenium are metastable. These include two monoclinic red allotropes and two amorphous allotropes, one of which is red and one of which is black. The red allotrope converts to the black allotrope in the presence of heat. The gray allotrope of selenium is made from spirals on selenium atoms, while one of the red allotropes is made of stacks of selenium rings (Se_{8}).

Tellurium is not known to have any allotropes, although its typical form is hexagonal. Polonium has two allotropes, which are known as α-polonium and β-polonium. α-polonium has a cubic crystal structure and converts to the rhombohedral β-polonium at 36 °C.

The chalcogens have varying crystal structures. Oxygen's crystal structure is monoclinic, sulfur's is orthorhombic, selenium and tellurium have the hexagonal crystal structure, while polonium has a cubic crystal structure.

=== Chemical ===
Oxygen, sulfur, and selenium are nonmetals, and tellurium is a metalloid, meaning that its chemical properties are between those of a metal and those of a nonmetal. It is not certain whether polonium is a metal or a metalloid. Some sources refer to polonium as a metalloid, although it has some metallic properties. Also, some allotropes of selenium display characteristics of a metalloid, even though selenium is usually considered a nonmetal. Even though oxygen is a chalcogen, its chemical properties are different from those of other chalcogens. One reason for this is that the heavier chalcogens have vacant d-orbitals. Oxygen's electronegativity is also much higher than those of the other chalcogens. This makes oxygen's electric polarizability several times lower than those of the other chalcogens.

For covalent bonding a chalcogen may accept two electrons according to the octet rule, leaving two lone pairs. When an atom forms two single bonds, they form an angle between 90° and 120°. In 1+ cations, such as H_{3}O^{+}, a chalcogen forms three molecular orbitals arranged in a trigonal pyramidal fashion and one lone pair. Double bonds are also common in chalcogen compounds, for example in chalcogenates (see below).

The oxidation number of the most common chalcogen compounds with positive metals is −2. However the tendency for chalcogens to form compounds in the −2 state decreases towards the heavier chalcogens. Other oxidation numbers, such as −1 in pyrite and peroxide, do occur. The highest formal oxidation number is +6. This oxidation number is found in sulfates, selenates, tellurates, polonates, and their corresponding acids, such as sulfuric acid.

Oxygen is the most electronegative element except for fluorine, and forms compounds with almost all of the chemical elements, including some of the noble gases. It commonly bonds with many metals and metalloids to form oxides, including iron oxide, titanium oxide, and silicon oxide. Oxygen's most common oxidation state is −2, and the oxidation state −1 is also relatively common. With hydrogen it forms water and hydrogen peroxide. Organic oxygen compounds are ubiquitous in organic chemistry.

Sulfur's oxidation states are −2, +2, +4, and +6. Sulfur-containing analogs of oxygen compounds often have the prefix thio-. Sulfur's chemistry is similar to oxygen's, in many ways. One difference is that sulfur-sulfur double bonds are far weaker than oxygen-oxygen double bonds, but sulfur-sulfur single bonds are stronger than oxygen-oxygen single bonds. Organic sulfur compounds such as thiols have a strong specific smell, and a few are utilized by some organisms.

Selenium's oxidation states are −2, +4, and +6. Selenium, like most chalcogens, bonds with oxygen. There are some organic selenium compounds, such as selenoproteins. Tellurium's oxidation states are −2, +2, +4, and +6. Tellurium forms the oxides tellurium monoxide, tellurium dioxide, and tellurium trioxide. Polonium's oxidation states are +2 and +4.

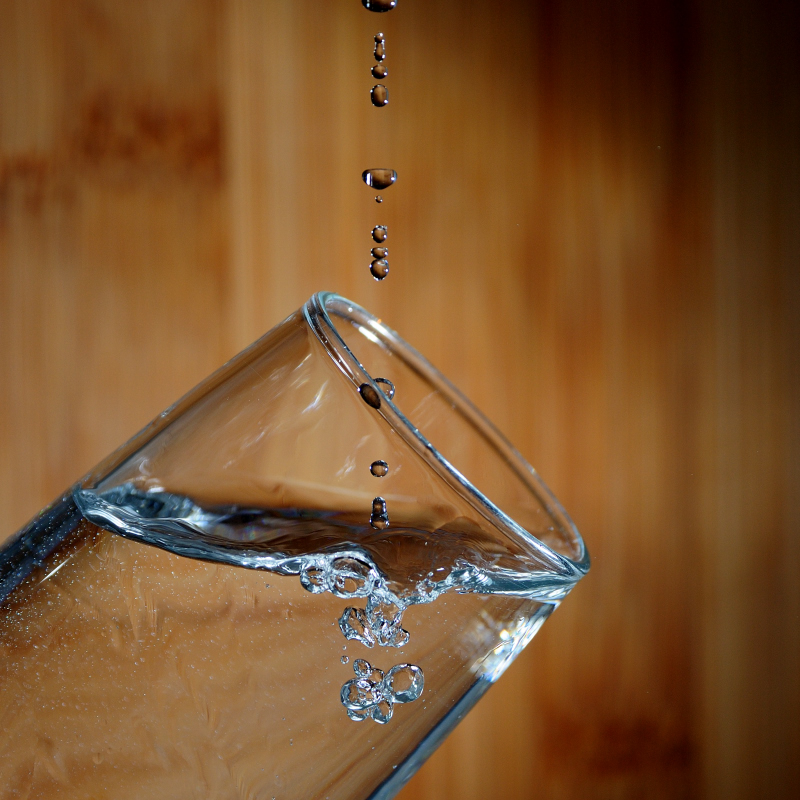
Water (H_{2}O) is the most familiar chalcogen-containing compound.

There are many acids containing chalcogens, including sulfuric acid, sulfurous acid, selenic acid, and telluric acid. All hydrogen chalcogenides are toxic except for water. Oxygen ions often come in the forms of oxide ions (O^{2−}), peroxide ions (O^{2−}_{2}), and hydroxide ions (OH^{−}). Sulfur ions generally come in the form of sulfides (S^{2−}), bisulfides (SH^{−}), sulfites (SO^{2−}_{3}), sulfates (SO^{2−}_{4}), and thiosulfates (S_{2}O^{2−}_{3}). Selenium ions usually come in the form of selenides (Se^{2−}), selenites (SeO^{2−}_{3}) and selenates (SeO^{2−}_{4}). Tellurium ions often come in the form of tellurates (TeO^{2−}_{4}). Molecules containing metal bonded to chalcogens are common as minerals. For example, pyrite (FeS_{2}) is an iron ore, and the rare mineral calaverite is the ditelluride (Au, Ag)Te_{2}.

Although all group 16 elements of the periodic table, including oxygen, can be defined as chalcogens, oxygen and oxides are usually distinguished from chalcogens and chalcogenides. The term chalcogenide is more commonly reserved for sulfides, selenides, and tellurides, rather than for oxides.

Except for polonium, the chalcogens are all fairly similar to each other chemically. They all form X^{2−} ions when reacting with electropositive metals.

Sulfide minerals and analogous compounds produce gases upon reaction with oxygen.

== Compounds ==
=== With halogens ===
Chalcogens also form compounds with halogens known as chalcohalides, or chalcogen halides. The majority of simple chalcogen halides are well-known and widely used as chemical reagents. However, more complicated chalcogen halides, such as sulfenyl, sulfonyl, and sulfuryl halides, are less well known to science. Out of the compounds consisting purely of chalcogens and halogens, there are a total of 13 chalcogen fluorides, nine chalcogen chlorides, eight chalcogen bromides, and six chalcogen iodides that are known. The heavier chalcogen halides often have significant molecular interactions. Sulfur fluorides with low valences are fairly unstable and little is known about their properties. However, sulfur fluorides with high valences, such as sulfur hexafluoride, are stable and well-known. Sulfur tetrafluoride is also a well-known sulfur fluoride. Certain selenium fluorides, such as selenium difluoride, have been produced in small amounts. The crystal structures of both selenium tetrafluoride and tellurium tetrafluoride are known. Chalcogen chlorides and bromides have also been explored. In particular, selenium dichloride and sulfur dichloride can react to form organic selenium compounds. Dichalcogen dihalides, such as Se_{2}Cl_{2} also are known to exist. There are also mixed chalcogen-halogen compounds. These include SeSX_{2}, with X being chlorine or bromine. Such compounds can form in mixtures of sulfur dichloride and selenium halides. These compounds have been fairly recently structurally characterized, as of 2008. In general, diselenium and disulfur chlorides and bromides are useful chemical reagents. Chalcogen halides with attached metal atoms are soluble in organic solutions. One example of such a compound is MoS_{2}Cl_{3}. Unlike selenium chlorides and bromides, selenium iodides have not been isolated, as of 2008, although it is likely that they occur in solution. Diselenium diiodide, however, does occur in equilibrium with selenium atoms and iodine molecules. Some tellurium halides with low valences, such as Te_{2}Cl_{2} and Te_{2}Br_{2}, form polymers when in the solid state. These tellurium halides can be synthesized by the reduction of pure tellurium with superhydride and reacting the resulting product with tellurium tetrahalides. Ditellurium dihalides tend to get less stable as the halides become lower in atomic number and atomic mass. Tellurium also forms iodides with even fewer iodine atoms than diiodides. These include TeI and Te_{2}I. These compounds have extended structures in the solid state. Halogens and chalcogens can also form halochalcogenate anions.

=== Organic ===
Alcohols, phenols and other similar compounds contain oxygen. However, in thiols, selenols and tellurols; sulfur, selenium, and tellurium replace oxygen. Thiols are better known than selenols or tellurols. Aside from alcohols, thiols are the most stable chalcogenols and tellurols are the least stable, being unstable in heat or light. Other organic chalcogen compounds include thioethers, selenoethers and telluroethers. Some of these, such as dimethyl sulfide, diethyl sulfide, and dipropyl sulfide are commercially available. Selenoethers are in the form of R_{2}Se or RSeR. Telluroethers such as dimethyl telluride are typically prepared in the same way as thioethers and selenoethers. Organic chalcogen compounds, especially organic sulfur compounds, have the tendency to smell unpleasant. Dimethyl telluride also smells unpleasant, and selenophenol is renowned for its "metaphysical stench". There are also thioketones, selenoketones, and telluroketones. Out of these, thioketones are the most well-studied with 80% of chalcogenoketones papers being about them. Selenoketones make up 16% of such papers and telluroketones make up 4% of them. Thioketones have well-studied non-linear electric and photophysical properties. Selenoketones are less stable than thioketones and telluroketones are less stable than selenoketones. Telluroketones have the highest level of polarity of chalcogenoketones.

=== With metals ===
There is a very large number of metal chalcogenides. There are also ternary compounds containing alkali metals and transition metals. Highly metal-rich metal chalcogenides, such as Lu_{7}Te and Lu_{8}Te have domains of the metal's crystal lattice containing chalcogen atoms. While these compounds do exist, analogous chemicals that contain lanthanum, praseodymium, gadolinium, holmium, terbium, or ytterbium have not been discovered, as of 2008. The boron group metals aluminum, gallium, and indium also form bonds to chalcogens. The Ti^{3+} ion forms chalcogenide dimers such as TiTl_{5}Se_{8}. Metal chalcogenide dimers also occur as lower tellurides, such as Zr_{5}Te_{6}.

Elemental chalcogens react with certain lanthanide compounds to form lanthanide clusters rich in chalcogens. Uranium(IV) chalcogenol compounds also exist. There are also transition metal chalcogenols which have potential to serve as catalysts and stabilize nanoparticles.

=== With pnictogens ===
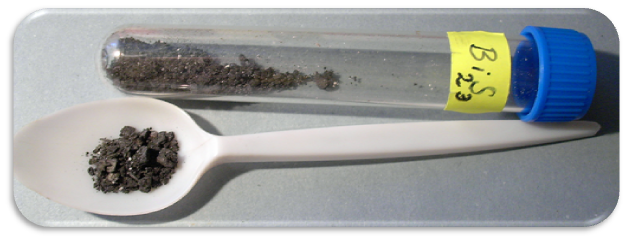
Bismuth sulfide, a pnictogen chalcogenide

Compounds with chalcogen-phosphorus bonds have been explored for more than 200 years. These compounds include unsophisticated phosphorus chalcogenides as well as large molecules with biological roles and phosphorus-chalcogen compounds with metal clusters. These compounds have numerous applications, including organo-phosphate insecticides, strike-anywhere matches and quantum dots. A total of 130,000 compounds with at least one phosphorus-sulfur bond, 6000 compounds with at least one phosphorus-selenium bond, and 350 compounds with at least one phosphorus-tellurium bond have been discovered. The decrease in the number of chalcogen-phosphorus compounds further down the periodic table is due to diminishing bond strength. Such compounds tend to have at least one phosphorus atom in the center, surrounded by four chalcogens and side chains. However, some phosphorus-chalcogen compounds also contain hydrogen (such as secondary phosphine chalcogenides) or nitrogen (such as dichalcogenoimidodiphosphates). Phosphorus selenides are typically harder to handle that phosphorus sulfides, and compounds in the form P_{x}Te_{y} have not been discovered. Chalcogens also bond with other pnictogens, such as arsenic, antimony, and bismuth. Heavier chalcogen pnictides tend to form ribbon-like polymers instead of individual molecules. Chemical formulas of these compounds include Bi_{2}S_{3} and Sb_{2}Se_{3}. Ternary chalcogen pnictides are also known. Examples of these include P_{4}O_{6}Se and P_{3}SbS_{3}. salts containing chalcogens and pnictogens also exist. Almost all chalcogen pnictide salts are typically in the form of [Pn_{x}E_{4x}]^{3−}, where Pn is a pnictogen and E is a chalcogen. Tertiary phosphines can react with chalcogens to form compounds in the form of R_{3}PE, where E is a chalcogen. When E is sulfur, these compounds are relatively stable, but they are less so when E is selenium or tellurium. Similarly, secondary phosphines can react with chalcogens to form secondary phosphine chalcogenides. However, these compounds are in a state of equilibrium with chalcogenophosphinous acid. Secondary phosphine chalcogenides are weak acids. Binary compounds consisting of antimony or arsenic and a chalcogen. These compounds tend to be colorful and can be created by a reaction of the constituent elements at temperatures of 500 to 900 °C (932 to 1,652 °F).

=== Other ===
Chalcogens form single bonds and double bonds with other carbon group elements than carbon, such as silicon, germanium, and tin. Such compounds typically form from a reaction of carbon group halides and chalcogenol salts or chalcogenol bases. Cyclic compounds with chalcogens, carbon group elements, and boron atoms exist, and occur from the reaction of boron dichalcogenates and carbon group metal halides. Compounds in the form of M-E, where M is silicon, germanium, or tin, and E is sulfur, selenium or tellurium have been discovered. These form when carbon group hydrides react or when heavier versions of carbenes react. Sulfur and tellurium can bond with organic compounds containing both silicon and phosphorus.

All of the chalcogens form hydrides. In some cases this occurs with chalcogens bonding with two hydrogen atoms. However tellurium hydride and polonium hydride are both volatile and highly labile. Also, oxygen can bond to hydrogen in a 1:1 ratio as in hydrogen peroxide, but this compound is unstable.

Chalcogen compounds form a number of interchalcogens. For instance, sulfur forms the toxic sulfur dioxide and sulfur trioxide. Tellurium also forms oxides. There are some chalcogen sulfides as well. These include selenium sulfide, an ingredient in some shampoos.

Since 1990, a number of borides with chalcogens bonded to them have been detected. The chalcogens in these compounds are mostly sulfur, although some do contain selenium instead. One such chalcogen boride consists of two molecules of dimethyl sulfide attached to a boron-hydrogen molecule. Other important boron-chalcogen compounds include macropolyhedral systems. Such compounds tend to feature sulfur as the chalcogen. There are also chalcogen borides with two, three, or four chalcogens. Many of these contain sulfur but some, such as Na_{2}B_{2}Se_{7} contain selenium instead.

== History ==
=== Early discoveries ===
Sulfur has been known since ancient times and is mentioned in the Bible fifteen times. It was known to the ancient Greeks and commonly mined by the ancient Romans. In the Middle Ages, it was a key part of alchemical experiments. In the 1700s and 1800s, scientists Joseph Louis Gay-Lussac and Louis-Jacques Thénard proved sulfur to be a chemical element.

Early attempts to separate oxygen from air were hampered by the fact that air was thought of as a single element up to the 17th and 18th centuries. Robert Hooke, Mikhail Lomonosov, Ole Borch, and Pierre Bayden all successfully created oxygen, but did not realize it at the time. Oxygen was discovered by Joseph Priestley in 1774 when he focused sunlight on a sample of mercuric oxide and collected the resulting gas. Carl Wilhelm Scheele had also created oxygen in 1771 by the same method, but Scheele did not publish his results until 1777.

Tellurium was first discovered in 1783 by Franz Joseph Müller von Reichenstein. He discovered tellurium in a sample of what is now known as calaverite. Müller assumed at first that the sample was pure antimony, but tests he ran on the sample did not agree with this. Muller then guessed that the sample was bismuth sulfide, but tests confirmed that the sample was not that. For some years, Muller pondered the problem. Eventually he realized that the sample was gold bonded with an unknown element. In 1796, Müller sent part of the sample to the German chemist Martin Klaproth, who purified the undiscovered element. Klaproth decided to call the element tellurium after the Latin word for earth.

Selenium was discovered in 1817 by Jöns Jacob Berzelius. Berzelius noticed a reddish-brown sediment at a sulfuric acid manufacturing plant. The sample was thought to contain arsenic. Berzelius initially thought that the sediment contained tellurium, but came to realize that it also contained a new element, which he named selenium after the Greek moon goddess Selene.

=== Periodic table placing ===
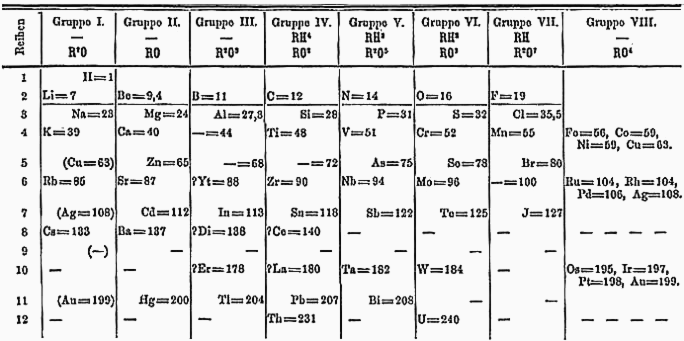
Dmitri Mendeleev's periodic system proposed in 1871 showing oxygen, sulfur, selenium and tellurium part of his group VI

Three of the chalcogens (sulfur, selenium, and tellurium) were part of the discovery of periodicity, as they are among a series of triads of elements in the same group that were noted by Johann Wolfgang Döbereiner as having similar properties. Around 1865 John Newlands produced a series of papers where he listed the elements in order of increasing atomic weight and similar physical and chemical properties that recurred at intervals of eight; he likened such periodicity to the octaves of music. His version included a "group b" consisting of oxygen, sulfur, selenium, tellurium, and osmium.

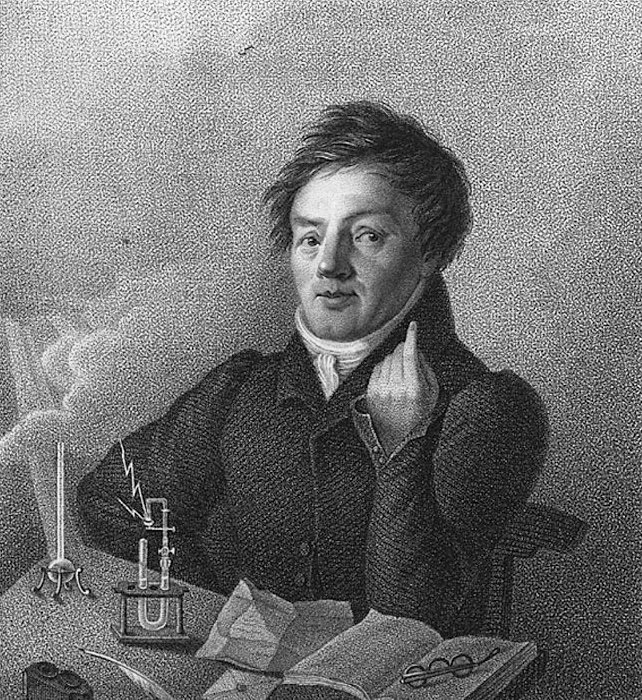
Johann Wolfgang Döbereiner was among the first to notice similarities between what are now known as chalcogens.

After 1869, Dmitri Mendeleev proposed his periodic table placing oxygen at the top of "group VI" above sulfur, selenium, and tellurium. Chromium, molybdenum, tungsten, and uranium were sometimes included in this group, but they would be later rearranged as part of group VIB; uranium would later be moved to the actinide series. Oxygen, along with sulfur, selenium, tellurium, and later polonium would be grouped in group VIA, until the group's name was changed to group 16 in 1988.

=== Modern discoveries ===
In the late 19th century, Marie Curie and Pierre Curie discovered that a sample of pitchblende was emitting four times as much radioactivity as could be explained by the presence of uranium alone. The Curies gathered several tons of pitchblende and refined it for several months until they had a pure sample of polonium. The discovery officially took place in 1898. Prior to the invention of particle accelerators, the only way to produce polonium was to extract it over several months from uranium ore.

The first attempt at creating livermorium was from 1976 to 1977 at the LBNL, who bombarded curium-248 with calcium-48, but were not successful. After several failed attempts in 1977, 1998, and 1999 by research groups in Russia, Germany, and the US, livermorium was created successfully in 2000 at the Joint Institute for Nuclear Research by bombarding curium-248 atoms with calcium-48 atoms. The element was known as ununhexium until it was officially named livermorium in 2012.

=== Names and etymology ===
In the 19th century, Jons Jacob Berzelius suggested calling the elements in group 16 "amphigens", as the elements in the group formed amphid salts (salts of oxyacids, formerly regarded as composed of two oxides, an acid and a basic oxide). The term received some use in the early 1800s but is now obsolete. The name chalcogen comes from the Greek words χαλκος (chalkos, most narrowly "copper", but the term was also used for bronze, brass, any metal in the poetic sense, ore, and coin), and γενές (genes, born, gender, kindle, produce). It was first used in 1932 by Wilhelm Biltz's group at Leibniz University Hannover, where it was proposed by Werner Fischer. The word "chalcogen" gained popularity in Germany during the 1930s because the term was analogous to "halogen". Although the literal meanings of the modern Greek words imply that chalcogen means "copper-former", this is misleading because the chalcogens have nothing to do with copper in particular. "Ore-former" has been suggested as a better translation, as the vast majority of metal ores are chalcogenides and the word χαλκος in ancient Greek was associated with metals and metal-bearing rock in general; copper, and its alloy bronze, was one of the first metals to be used by humans.

Oxygen's name comes from the Greek words oxy genes, meaning "acid-forming". Sulfur's name comes from either the Latin word sulfurium or the Sanskrit word sulvere; both of those terms are ancient words for sulfur. Selenium is named after the Greek goddess of the moon, Selene, to match the previously discovered element tellurium, whose name comes from the Latin word telus, meaning earth. Polonium is named after Marie Curie's country of birth, Poland. Livermorium is named for the Lawrence Livermore National Laboratory.

== Occurrence ==
The four lightest chalcogens (oxygen, sulfur, selenium, and tellurium) are all primordial elements on Earth. Sulfur and oxygen occur as constituent copper ores and selenium and tellurium occur in small traces in such ores. Polonium forms naturally from the decay of other elements, even though it is not primordial. Livermorium does not occur naturally at all.

Oxygen makes up 21% of the atmosphere by weight, 89% of water by weight, 46% of the Earth's crust by weight, and 65% of the human body. Oxygen also occurs in many minerals, being found in all oxide minerals and hydroxide minerals, and in numerous other mineral groups. Stars of at least eight times the mass of the Sun also produce oxygen in their cores via nuclear fusion. Oxygen is the third-most abundant element in the universe, making up 1% of the universe by weight.

Sulfur makes up 0.035% of the Earth's crust by weight, making it the 17th most abundant element there and makes up 0.25% of the human body. It is a major component of soil. Sulfur makes up 870 parts per million of seawater and about 1 part per billion of the atmosphere. Sulfur can be found in elemental form or in the form of sulfide minerals, sulfate minerals, or sulfosalt minerals. Stars of at least 12 times the mass of the Sun produce sulfur in their cores via nuclear fusion. Sulfur is the tenth most abundant element in the universe, making up 500 parts per million of the universe by weight.

Selenium makes up 0.05 parts per million of the Earth's crust by weight. This makes it the 67th most abundant element in the Earth's crust. Selenium makes up on average 5 parts per million of the soils. Seawater contains around 200 parts per trillion of selenium. The atmosphere contains 1 nanogram of selenium per cubic meter. There are mineral groups known as selenates and selenites, but there are not many minerals in these groups. Selenium is not produced directly by nuclear fusion. Selenium makes up 30 parts per billion of the universe by weight.

There are only 5 parts per billion of tellurium in the Earth's crust and 15 parts per billion of tellurium in seawater. Tellurium is one of the eight or nine least abundant elements in the Earth's crust. There are a few dozen tellurate minerals and telluride minerals, and tellurium occurs in some minerals with gold, such as sylvanite and calaverite. Tellurium makes up 9 parts per billion of the universe by weight.

Polonium only occurs in trace amounts on Earth, via radioactive decay of uranium and thorium. It is present in uranium ores in concentrations of 100 micrograms per metric ton. Very minute amounts of polonium exist in the soil and thus in most food, and thus in the human body. The Earth's crust contains less than 1 part per billion of polonium, making it one of the ten rarest metals on Earth.

Livermorium is always produced artificially in particle accelerators. Even when it is produced, only a small number of atoms are synthesized at a time.

=== Chalcophile elements ===
Chalcophile elements are those that remain on or close to the surface because they combine readily with chalcogens other than oxygen, forming compounds which do not sink into the core. Chalcophile ("chalcogen-loving") elements in this context are those metals and heavier nonmetals that have a low affinity for oxygen and prefer to bond with the heavier chalcogen sulfur as sulfides. Because sulfide minerals are much denser than the silicate minerals formed by lithophile elements, chalcophile elements separated below the lithophiles at the time of the first crystallisation of the Earth's crust. This has led to their depletion in the Earth's crust relative to their solar abundances, though this depletion has not reached the levels found with siderophile elements.

Goldschmidt classification in the periodic table

	1	2		3	4	5	6	7	8	9	10	11	12	13	14	15	16	17	18
Group →
↓ Period
1	1 H																		2 He
2	3 Li	4 Be												5 B	6 C	7 N	8 O	9 F	10; Ne
3	11; Na	12; Mg												13; Al	14; Si	15; P	16; S	17; Cl	18; Ar
4	19; K	20; Ca		21; Sc	22; Ti	23; V	24; Cr	25; Mn	26; Fe	27; Co	28; Ni	29; Cu	30; Zn	31; Ga	32; Ge	33; As	34; Se	35; Br	36; Kr
5	37; Rb	38; Sr		39; Y	40; Zr	41; Nb	42; Mo	43; Tc	44; Ru	45; Rh	46; Pd	47; Ag	48; Cd	49; In	50; Sn	51; Sb	52; Te	53; I	54; Xe
6	55; Cs	56; Ba	1 asterisk	71; Lu	72; Hf	73; Ta	74; W	75; Re	76; Os	77; Ir	78; Pt	79; Au	80; Hg	81; Tl	82; Pb	83; Bi	84; Po	85; At	86; Rn
7	87; Fr	88; Ra	1 asterisk	103; Lr	104; Rf	105; Db	106; Sg	107; Bh	108; Hs	109; Mt	110; Ds	111; Rg	112; Cn	113; Nh	114; Fl	115; Mc	116; Lv	117; Ts	118; Og
1 asterisk				57; La	58; Ce	59; Pr	60; Nd	61; Pm	62; Sm	63; Eu	64; Gd	65; Tb	66; Dy	67; Ho	68; Er	69; Tm	70; Yb
1 asterisk				89; Ac	90; Th	91; Pa	92; U	93; Np	94; Pu	95; Am	96; Cm	97; Bk	98; Cf	99; Es	100; Fm	101; Md	102; No

Goldschmidt classification: Lithophile Siderophile Chalcophile Atmophile Trace/Synthetic

== Production ==
Approximately 100 million metric tons of oxygen are produced yearly. Oxygen is most commonly produced by fractional distillation, in which air is cooled to a liquid, then warmed, allowing all the components of air except for oxygen to turn to gases and escape. Fractionally distilling air several times can produce 99.5% pure oxygen. Another method with which oxygen is produced is to send a stream of dry, clean air through a bed of molecular sieves made of zeolite, which absorbs the nitrogen in the air, leaving 90 to 93% pure oxygen.

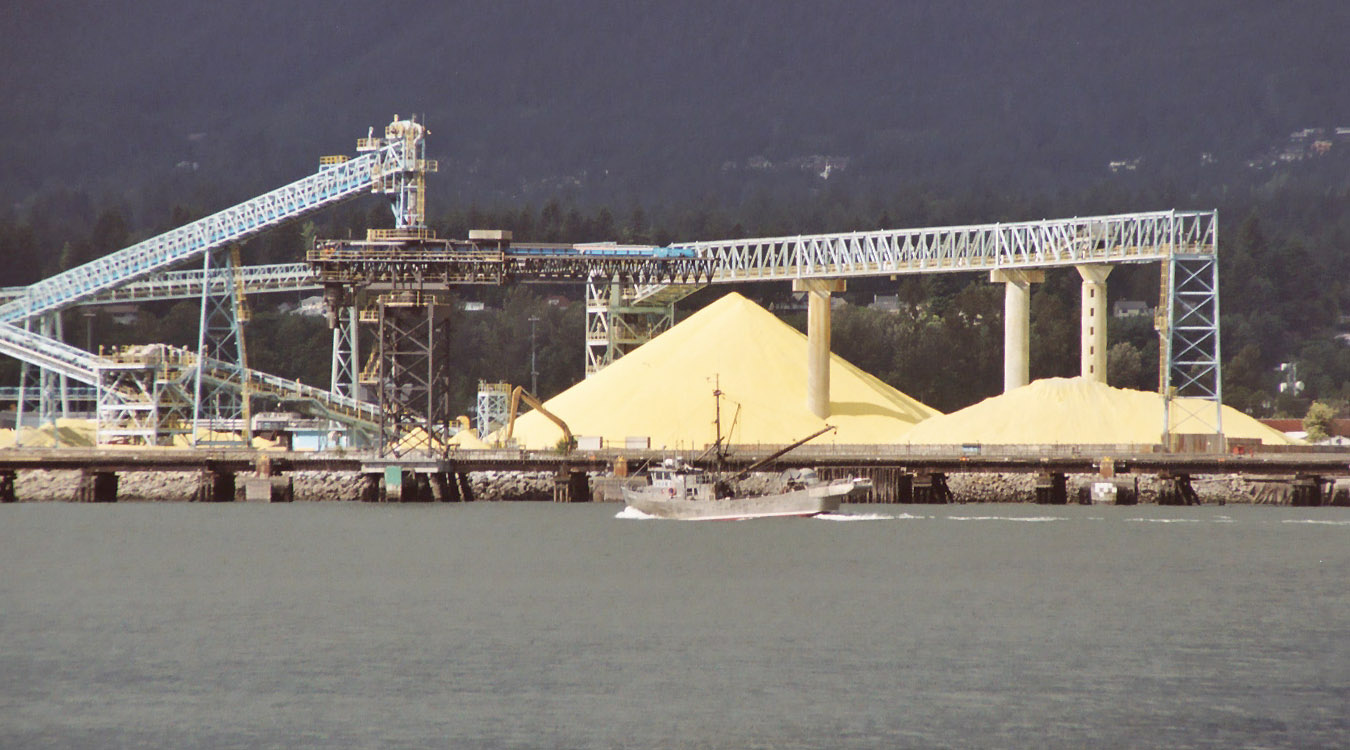
Sulfur recovered from oil refining in Alberta, stockpiled for shipment in North Vancouver, British Columbia

Sulfur can be mined in its elemental form, although this method is no longer as popular as it used to be. In 1865 a large deposit of elemental sulfur was discovered in the U.S. states of Louisiana and Texas, but it was difficult to extract at the time. In the 1890s, Herman Frasch came up with the solution of liquefying the sulfur with superheated steam and pumping the sulfur up to the surface. These days sulfur is instead more often extracted from oil, natural gas, and tar.

The world production of selenium is around 1500 metric tons per year, out of which roughly 10% is recycled. Japan is the largest producer, producing 800 metric tons of selenium per year. Other large producers include Belgium (300 metric tons per year), the United States (over 200 metric tons per year), Sweden (130 metric tons per year), and Russia (100 metric tons per year). Selenium can be extracted from the waste from the process of electrolytically refining copper. Another method of producing selenium is to farm selenium-gathering plants such as milk vetch. This method could produce three kilograms of selenium per acre, but is not commonly practiced.

Tellurium is mostly produced as a by-product of the processing of copper. Tellurium can also be refined by electrolytic reduction of sodium telluride. The world production of tellurium is between 150 and 200 metric tons per year. The United States is one of the largest producers of tellurium, producing around 50 metric tons per year. Peru, Japan, and Canada are also large producers of tellurium.

Until the creation of nuclear reactors, all polonium had to be extracted from uranium ore. In modern times, most isotopes of polonium are produced by bombarding bismuth with neutrons. Polonium can also be produced by high neutron fluxes in nuclear reactors. Approximately 100 grams of polonium are produced yearly. All the polonium produced for commercial purposes is made in the Ozersk nuclear reactor in Russia. From there, it is taken to Samara, Russia for purification, and from there to St. Petersburg for distribution. The United States is the largest consumer of polonium.

All livermorium is produced artificially in particle accelerators. The first successful production of livermorium was achieved by bombarding curium-248 atoms with calcium-48 atoms. As of 2011, roughly 25 atoms of livermorium had been synthesized.

== Applications ==
Metabolism is the most important source and use of oxygen. Minor industrial uses include Steelmaking (55% of all purified oxygen produced), the chemical industry (25% of all purified oxygen), medical use, water treatment (as oxygen kills some types of bacteria), rocket fuel (in liquid form), and metal cutting.

Most sulfur produced is transformed into sulfur dioxide, which is further transformed into sulfuric acid, a very common industrial chemical. Other common uses include being a key ingredient of gunpowder and Greek fire, and being used to change soil pH. Sulfur is also mixed into rubber to vulcanize it. Sulfur is used in some types of concrete and fireworks. 60% of all sulfuric acid produced is used to generate phosphoric acid. Sulfur is used as a pesticide (specifically as an acaricide and fungicide) on "orchard, ornamental, vegetable, grain, and other crops."

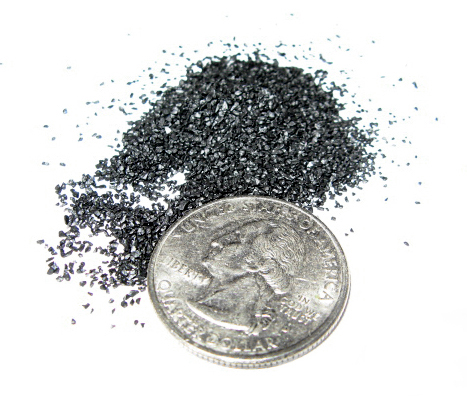
Gunpowder, an application of sulfur

Around 40% of all selenium produced goes to glassmaking. 30% of all selenium produced goes to metallurgy, including manganese production. 15% of all selenium produced goes to agriculture. Electronics such as photovoltaic materials claim 10% of all selenium produced. Pigments account for 5% of all selenium produced. Historically, machines such as photocopiers and light meters used one-third of all selenium produced, but this application is in steady decline.

Tellurium suboxide, a mixture of tellurium and tellurium dioxide, is used in the rewritable data layer of some CD-RW disks and DVD-RW disks. Bismuth telluride is also used in many microelectronic devices, such as photoreceptors. Tellurium is sometimes used as an alternative to sulfur in vulcanized rubber. Cadmium telluride is used as a high-efficiency material in solar panels.

Some of polonium's applications relate to the element's radioactivity. For instance, polonium is used as an alpha-particle generator for research. Polonium alloyed with beryllium provides an efficient neutron source. Polonium is also used in nuclear batteries. Most polonium is used in antistatic devices. Livermorium does not have any uses whatsoever due to its extreme rarity and short half-life.

Organochalcogen compounds are involved in the semiconductor process. These compounds also feature into ligand chemistry and biochemistry. One application of chalcogens themselves is to manipulate redox couples in supramolecular chemistry (chemistry involving non-covalent bond interactions). This application leads on to such applications as crystal packing, assembly of large molecules, and biological recognition of patterns. The secondary bonding interactions of the larger chalcogens, selenium and tellurium, can create organic solvent-holding acetylene nanotubes. Chalcogen interactions are useful for conformational analysis and stereoelectronic effects, among other things. Chalcogenides with through bonds also have applications. For instance, divalent sulfur can stabilize carbanions, cationic centers, and radical. Chalcogens can confer upon ligands (such as DCTO) properties such as being able to transform Cu(II) to Cu(I). Studying chalcogen interactions gives access to radical cations, which are used in mainstream synthetic chemistry. Metallic redox centers of biological importance are tunable by interactions of ligands containing chalcogens, such as methionine and selenocysteine. Also, chalcogen through-bonds can provide insight about the process of electron transfer.

== Biological role ==
DNA, an important biological compound containing oxygen

Oxygen is needed by almost all organisms for the purpose of generating ATP. It is also a key component of most other biological compounds, such as water, amino acids and DNA. Human blood contains a large amount of oxygen. Human bones contain 28% oxygen. Human tissue contains 16% oxygen. A typical 70-kilogram human contains 43 kilograms of oxygen, mostly in the form of water.

All animals need significant amounts of sulfur. Some amino acids, such as cysteine and methionine contain sulfur. Plant roots take up sulfate ions from the soil and reduce it to sulfide ions. Metalloproteins also use sulfur to attach to useful metal atoms in the body and sulfur similarly attaches itself to poisonous metal atoms like cadmium to haul them to the safety of the liver. On average, humans consume 900 milligrams of sulfur each day. Sulfur compounds, such as those found in skunk spray often have strong odors.

All animals and some plants need trace amounts of selenium, but only for some specialized enzymes. Humans consume on average between 6 and 200 micrograms of selenium per day. Mushrooms and brazil nuts are especially noted for their high selenium content. Selenium in foods is most commonly found in the form of amino acids such as selenocysteine and selenomethionine. Selenium can protect against heavy metal poisoning.

Tellurium is not known to be needed for animal life, although a few fungi can incorporate it in compounds in place of selenium. Microorganisms also absorb tellurium and emit dimethyl telluride. Most tellurium in the blood stream is excreted slowly in urine, but some is converted to dimethyl telluride and released through the lungs. On average, humans ingest about 600 micrograms of tellurium daily. Plants can take up some tellurium from the soil. Onions and garlic have been found to contain as much as 300 parts per million of tellurium in dry weight.

Polonium has no biological role, and is highly toxic on account of being radioactive.

== Toxicity ==
NFPA 704 safety square
- 2 0 0 Fire diamond for selenium

Oxygen is generally nontoxic, but oxygen toxicity has been reported when it is used in high concentrations. In both elemental gaseous form and as a component of water, it is vital to almost all life on Earth. Despite this, liquid oxygen is highly dangerous. Even gaseous oxygen is dangerous in excess. For instance, sports divers have occasionally drowned from convulsions caused by breathing pure oxygen at a depth of more than 10 meters (33 feet) underwater. Oxygen is also toxic to some bacteria. Ozone, an allotrope of oxygen, is toxic to most life. It can cause lesions in the respiratory tract.

Sulfur is generally nontoxic and is even a vital nutrient for humans. However, in its elemental form it can cause redness in the eyes and skin, a burning sensation and a cough if inhaled, a burning sensation and diarrhoea and/or catharsis if ingested, and can irritate the mucous membranes. An excess of sulfur can be toxic for cows because microbes in the rumens of cows produce toxic hydrogen sulfide upon reaction with sulfur. Many sulfur compounds, such as hydrogen sulfide (H_{2}S) and sulfur dioxide (SO_{2}) are highly toxic.

Selenium is a trace nutrient required by humans on the order of tens or hundreds of micrograms per day. A dose of over 450 micrograms can be toxic, resulting in bad breath and body odor. Extended, low-level exposure, which can occur at some industries, results in weight loss, anemia, and dermatitis. In many cases of selenium poisoning, selenous acid is formed in the body. Hydrogen selenide (H_{2}Se) is highly toxic.

Exposure to tellurium can produce unpleasant side effects. As little as 10 micrograms of tellurium per cubic meter of air can cause notoriously unpleasant breath, described as smelling like rotten garlic. Acute tellurium poisoning can cause vomiting, gut inflammation, internal bleeding, and respiratory failure. Extended, low-level exposure to tellurium causes tiredness and indigestion. Sodium tellurite (Na_{2}TeO_{3}) is lethal in amounts of around 2 grams.

Polonium is dangerous as an alpha particle emitter. If ingested, polonium-210 is a million times as toxic as hydrogen cyanide by weight; it has been used as a murder weapon in the past, most famously to kill Alexander Litvinenko. Polonium poisoning can cause nausea, vomiting, anorexia, and lymphopenia. It can also damage hair follicles and white blood cells. Polonium-210 is only dangerous if ingested or inhaled because its alpha particle emissions cannot penetrate human skin. Polonium-209 is also toxic, and can cause leukemia.

== Amphid salts ==
Amphid salts was a name given by Jons Jacob Berzelius in the 19th century for chemical salts derived from the 16th group of the periodic table which included oxygen, sulfur, selenium, and tellurium. The term received some use in the early 1800s but is now obsolete. The current term in use for the 16th group is chalcogens.

== See also ==
- Chalcogenide
- Gold chalcogenides
- Halogen
- Interchalcogen
- Pnictogen
