= Adduct purification =

Technique for preparing extremely pure simple organometallic compounds

Adduct purification is a technique for preparing extremely pure simple organometallic compounds, which are generally unstable and hard to handle, by purifying a stable adduct with a Lewis acid and then obtaining the desired product from the pure adduct by thermal decomposition.

Epichem Limited is the licensee of the major patents in this field, and uses the trademark EpiPure to refer to adduct-purified materials; Professor Anthony Jones at Liverpool University is the initiator of the field and author of many of the important papers.

The choice of Lewis acid and of reaction medium is important; the desired organometallics are almost always air- and water-sensitive. Initial work was done in ether, but this led to oxygen impurities, and so more recent work involves tertiary amines or nitrogen-substituted crown ethers.
