= Telluromethionine =

Names
- IUPAC name (2S)-2-amino-4-methyltellanylbutanoic acid
- Other names TeMet

Identifiers
3D model (JSmol)	L: Interactive image
ChemSpider	L: 9033023; D/L: 9911402
PubChem CID	L: 10857732
- InChI: InChI=1S/C5H11NO2Te/c1-9-3-2-4(6)5(7)8/h4H,2-3,6H2,1H3,(H,7,8)/t4-/m0/s1
- SMILES: L: C[Te]CCC(C(=O)O)N

Properties
Chemical formula	C_{5}H_{11}NO_{2}Te
Molar mass	244.7 g/mol
- Except where otherwise noted, data are given for materials in their standard state (at 25 °C [77 °F], 100 kPa). (what is ?) Infobox references

Telluromethionine (sometimes shortened to TeMet) is a rare and natural amino acid. It is a heavy analog of methionine and selenomethionine containing tellurium. Telluromethionine has been suggested as a probe for structural biochemistry, as it can be incorporated into proteins and used for X-ray crystallography and NMR measurements.

In aqueous solutions, telluromethionine oxidizes to a telluroxide, but can be recovered by use of DTT. Telluromethionine is not very stable in wheat germ extract, which impacts its translation rate. In the extract, elemental tellurium seems to form, suggesting a degradation mechanism, but this is not well understood. However, enriching proteins with tellurium in auxotrophic E. coli was successfully used to express several recombinant proteins.
