= Dimethyl telluride =

- Skeletal formula of dimethyl telluride with all implicit hydrogens shown

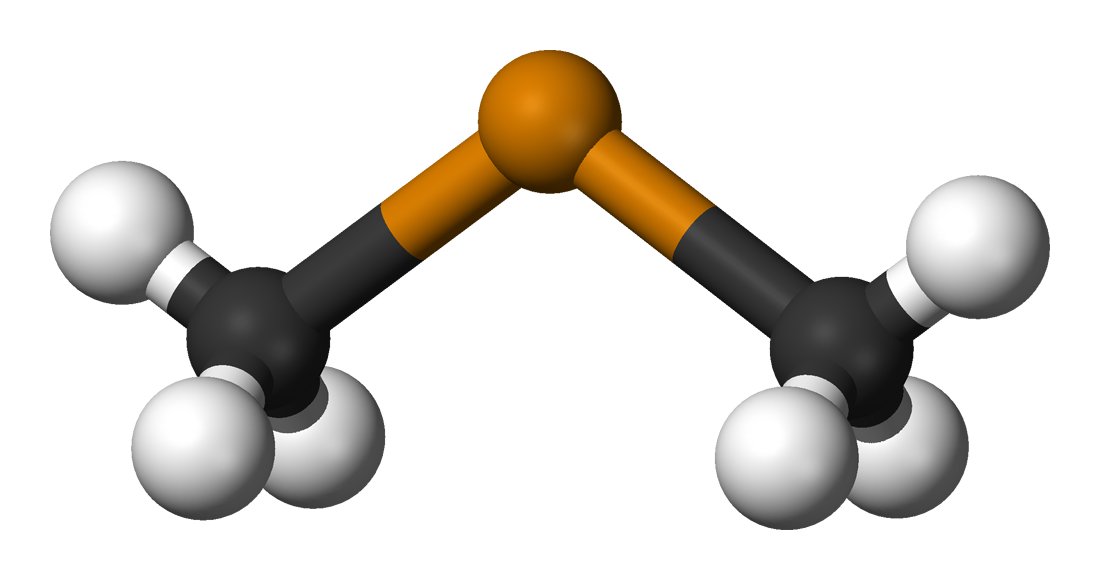
- Ball and stick model of dimethyl telluride

Names
- Preferred IUPAC name (Methyltellanyl)methane
- Other names Dimethyltellurium (additive); Dimethyltellane

Identifiers
CAS Number	593-80-6
3D model (JSmol)	Interactive image
Beilstein Reference	1696849
ChEBI	CHEBI:4613
ChemSpider	62199
ECHA InfoCard	100.008.919
EC Number	209-809-5
Gmelin Reference	1480
KEGG	C02677
MeSH	dimethyltelluride
PubChem CID	68977
CompTox Dashboard (EPA)	DTXSID1060477
- InChI: InChI=1S/C2H6Te/c1-3-2/h1-2H3 Key: YMUZFVVKDBZHGP-UHFFFAOYSA-N
- SMILES: C[Te]C

Properties
Chemical formula	C_{2}H_{6}Te
Molar mass	157.67 g·mol^{−1}
Appearance	Pale yellow, translucent liquid
Odor	Garlic
Melting point	−10 °C (14 °F; 263 K)
Boiling point	82 °C (180 °F; 355 K)

Related compounds
Related chalcogenides	Dimethyl oxide (dimethyl ether) Dimethyl sulfide Dimethyl selenide
Related compounds	Hydrogen telluride Diphenyl telluride
- Except where otherwise noted, data are given for materials in their standard state (at 25 °C [77 °F], 100 kPa). verify (what is ?) Infobox references

Dimethyl telluride is an organotelluride compound, formula (CH_{3})_{2}Te, also known by the abbreviation DMTe.

This was the first material used to grow epitaxial cadmium telluride and mercury cadmium telluride using metalorganic vapour phase epitaxy.

Dimethyl telluride as a product of microbial metabolism was first discovered in 1939. It is produced by some fungi and bacteria (Penicillium brevicaule, P. chrysogenum, and P. notatum and the bacterium Pseudomonas fluorescens).

The toxicity of DMTe is unclear. It is produced by the body when tellurium or one of its compounds are ingested. It is noticeable by the garlic smelling breath it gives those exposed, similar to the effect of DMSO. Tellurium is known to be toxic.
