= Tellurocysteine =

Names
- IUPAC name (2R)-2-Amino-3-tellanylpropanoic acid
- Other names Tellurocystine

Identifiers
| CAS Number | 122096-31-5 |
| 3D model (JSmol) | Interactive image |
| ChemSpider | 34500822 |
| PubChem CID | 129631934 |
- InChI: InChI=1S/C3H7NO2Te/c4-2(1-7)3(5)6/h2,7H,1,4H2,(H,5,6) Key: PRMLZSRTFWAUAH-UHFFFAOYSA-N
- SMILES: C([C@@H](C(=O)O)N)[Te]

Properties
| Chemical formula | C_{3}H_{7}NO_{2}Te |
| Molar mass | 216.69 g·mol^{−1} |
- Except where otherwise noted, data are given for materials in their standard state (at 25 °C [77 °F], 100 kPa). Infobox references

Tellurocysteine (in some publications referred to as Te-Cys) is an amino acid with the formula HTeCH_{2}CH(NH_{2})CO_{2}H. It is the heavy analogue of serine, cysteine, and selenocysteine. Tellurol (RTeH) is a rare and fragile functional group, especially alkyl derivatives. The C-Te bond (200 kJ/mol) is weak compared to 234 kJ/mol for the C-Se bond. These factors combine to make tellurocysteine very labile. Even selenocysteine occurs only rarely in nature. Instead of tellurocysteine, tellurocystine is generally isolated instead. Tellurocystine has the formula (TeCH_{2}CH(NH_{2})CO_{2}H)_{2}, with a central Te-Te bond.

Structure of L-tellurocystine.

== Properties ==
The fungus Aspergillus fumigatus is capable of incorporating tellurocysteine (and telluromethionine) into proteins when grown in appropriate media.

When incorporated into glutathione transferase, tellurocysteine efficiently inhibits aminoacylation and increases the efficiency of glutathione peroxidase.

== Synthesis ==
L-Tellurocystine has been prepared in low yield from a protected form of 3-iodoalanine. Thus, methyl (2R)-2-[(tert-butoxycarbonyl)amino]-3-iodopropionate reacts with lithium telluride to produce tellurocystine.
