= Franz-Joseph Müller von Reichenstein =

Austrian mineralogist

Franz-Joseph Müller, Freiherr von Reichenstein
- Born: 1 July 1740 or 4 October 1742; Poysdorf or Vienna, Archduchy of Austria (today Austria) or Hermannstadt, Principality of Transylvania (today Sibiu, Romania)
- Died: 12 October 1825 or 12 October 1826 (age 85 or 86 or 84); Vienna, Habsburg Empire (today Austria)
- Education: Bergakademie Schemnitz
- Known for: discovery of tellurium
- Scientific career
- Fields: mining and chemistry

Franz-Joseph Müller, Freiherr von Reichenstein (1 July 1740 or 4 October 1742 – 12 October 1825 or 1826) was an Austrian mineralogist and mining engineer. Müller held several positions in the Habsburg monarchy administration of mines and coinage in the Banat, Transylvania, and Tyrol. During his time in Transylvania he discovered tellurium in 1782. In his later career he became a member of the imperial council in Vienna and was knighted and elevated to the rank Freiherr in 1820.

== Place and date of birth ==
Müller was born in 1740 or 1742 in the Habsburg Empire. While the Allgemeine Deutsche Biographie gives 1 July 1740 and Vienna as date and place of birth, the Neue Deutsche Biographie prefers 4 October 1742 and the small town of Poysdorf in Lower Austria. The much older works Neuer Nekrolog der Deutschen and Oesterreichische National-Encyklopädie do not give a place of birth and only the year 1740 for his birth. Even articles by Mary Elvira Weeks on the discovery of tellurium, published in the Journal of Chemical Education in 1932, and 1935 quote two different locations of his birth: one in Vienna, Archduchy of Austria and the other Hermannstadt, Principality of Transylvania (present-day Sibiu, Romania). A newer biography on the topic makes clear that date and place of birth are not definitely known.

== Education and career ==
He studied philosophy and law in Vienna. After finishing his studies he started further studies at the Bergakademie (Mining Academy) in Schemnitz (Selmecbánya), Lower Hungary (today Banská Štiavnica, Slovakia) in 1763. He studied mining, mechanics, mineralogy and chemistry and after graduating he became a Markscheider (official mine surveyor) in 1768. In 1770 he joined the Hofcommission für die Regulierung der Banater Berg und Hüttenwerke (royal commission for mining in the Banat) where he gained a lot of knowledge on mining in the Banat. He was promoted to the rank of an Oberbergmeister (senior mining official) and became a mine manager in the same year.

In 1775 he became Oberbergmeister in the Tyrol town of Schwaz. Schwaz was one of the largest centres of silver and copper mining in Austria-Hungary in that time. In 1778 he discovered an occurrence of tourmaline in the Zillertal.

Müller became one of seven Thesaurariats councillor in Transylvania responsible for the supervision of all mining and coinage activities in Transylvania in 1778. After the dissolution of the Thesaurariat Müller became Oberinspector (chief surveyor) of all mining, smelting and salt production in Transylvania.

=== Discovery of tellurium ===
Müller as the Austrian chief surveyor of mines in Transylvania was responsible for the analysis of ore samples. He analyzed gold ore from Kleinschlatten (today Zlatna, Romania). This ore was known as "Faczebajer weißes blättriges Golderz" (white leafy gold ore from Faczebaja) or antimonalischer Goldkies (antimonic gold pyrite), and, according to Anton von Rupprecht, was Spießglaskönig (argent molybdique), containing native antimony. Müller concluded that the ore did not contain antimony, but that it was bismuth sulfide. The following year, he reported that this was erroneous and that the ore contained mostly gold and an unknown metal very similar to antimony. After a thorough investigation which lasted for three years and consisted of more than fifty tests, Müller determined the specific gravity of the mineral and noted the radish-like odor of the white smoke which passed off when the new metal was heated, the red color which the metal imparts to sulfuric acid, and the black precipitate which this solution gives when diluted with water. Nevertheless, he was not able to identify this metal and gave it the names aurum paradoxium and metallum problematicum, as it did not show the properties predicted for the expected antimony.

In 1798, the German chemist Martin Heinrich Klaproth isolated the new element from a sample sent by Müller. After a thorough examination of the material he concluded that a new metal was present in the sample. He called it tellurium, but gave the credit of the discovery to Müller.

=== Later life ===
In 1788 he was once more promoted and as Gubernialrath he held a powerful position in the administration of Transylvania. Müller was knighted by Leopold II to the lowest title of nobility, Edler, in the same year. From that point on he carried the name Franz-Joseph Müller Edler von Reichenstein. He was elected as a member of the Berlin Society of Friends of Natural Science.

In 1798 Müller became court counsellor and was appointed to the court in Vienna, where he was part of the imperial council. In 1818 Müller retired from his duties but held his position in the council until his death. He became Knight of the Order of Saint Stephen of Hungary in 1818 and became a noble by receiving the title of a Freiherr in 1820. Both honours were granted by the Emperor Franz I (II). Müller died in his 80s in 1825 or 1826 in Vienna.
