= Methaneseleninic acid =

Chemical compound (CH3SeO2H)

Names
- IUPAC name Methaneseleninic acid
- Other names Methylseleninic acid MSA

Identifiers
CAS Number	28274-57-9
3D model (JSmol)	Interactive image
ChEBI	CHEBI:77012
ChEMBL	ChEMBL399906
ChemSpider	141936
ECHA InfoCard	100.123.107
EC Number	608-183-4
KEGG	C18902
MeSH	C008493
PubChem CID	161597
UNII	9900C6V162
CompTox Dashboard (EPA)	DTXSID9040550
- InChI: InChI=1S/CH4O2Se/c1-4(2)3/h1H3,(H,2,3) Key: UEQANLFPOFICBH-UHFFFAOYSA-N; InChI=1/CH4O2Se/c1-4(2)3/h1H3,(H,2,3) Key: UEQANLFPOFICBH-UHFFFAOYAW
- SMILES: C[Se](O)=O

Properties
Chemical formula	CH_{3}SeO_{2}H
Molar mass	127.012 g·mol^{−1}
Appearance	White crystalline solid or powder
Odor	Stench
Melting point	128–132 °C (262–270 °F; 401–405 K)

Hazards
- GHS labelling
Pictograms	(GHS05: Corrosive) (GHS06: Toxic) (GHS08: Health hazard) (GHS09: Environmental hazard)
Signal word	Danger
Hazard statements	H301, H314, H331, H373, H410
Precautionary statements	P260, P264, P270, P271, P273, P280, P301+P310, P301+P330+P331, P303+P361+P353, P304+P340, P305+P351+P338, P310, P311, P314, P321, P330, P363, P391, P403+P233, P405, P501
- Except where otherwise noted, data are given for materials in their standard state (at 25 °C [77 °F], 100 kPa). Infobox references

Methaneseleninic acid (methylseleninic acid or MSA) is an organoselenium compound, a seleninic acid with the chemical formula CH_{3}SeO_{2}H. Its structure is CH_{3}−Se(=O)−OH.

== Preparation ==
Methaneseleninic acid is conveniently synthesized through oxidation of commercially available dimethyl diselenide by 3% hydrogen peroxide.

CH_{3}−Se−Se−CH_{3} + H_{2}O_{2} → 2 CH_{3}−Se(=O)−OH

Seleninic acids can be prepared by oxidation of selenoesters with one equivalent of dimethyldioxirane (DMDO). Use of excess DMDO affords little studied selenonic acids (R−Se(=O)_{2}−OH).

R−Se−C(=O)−R' + DMDO → R−Se(=O)−OH
R−Se−C(=O)−R' + excess DMDO → R−Se(=O)_{2}−OH

Selenenic acids, formed during the syn-elimination of selenoxides, undergo spontaneous disproportionation into the corresponding seleninic acids and diselenides:

4 R−Se−OH → 2 R−Se(=O)−OH + R−Se−Se−R

== Structure and properties ==
Methaneseleninic acid, from decomposition of Se-methylselenocysteine Se-oxide but also available commercially, has been characterized by X-ray crystallography. The configuration about the selenium atom is pyramidal, with Se-C = 1.925(8) Å, Se-O = 1.672(7) Å, Se-OH = 1.756(7) Å, the angle OSeO = 103.0(3)°, the angle HO-Se-C = 93.5(3)°, and the angle OSeC = 101.4(3)°. The structure is isomorphous to that of methanesulfinic acid Optical isomers of methaneseleninic acid can be isolated as chiral crystals by recrystallization from a mixture of methanol and toluene. The absolute configuration of one of the enantiomers was determined by X-ray crystallography. Optically active methaneseleninic acid was stable toward racemization in the solid state, although it racemized very rapidly in solution.

== Anticancer activity ==
Methaneseleninic acid shows potential anticancer activity and is a model for studying the anticancer effects of selenium in vitro. Methaneseleninic acid shows superior in vivo inhibitory efficacy toward human prostate cancer compared to selenomethionine or selenite (ion). It has recently been reported that methaneseleninic acid enhances the efficacy of paclitaxel for treatment of triple-negative breast cancer, that methaneseleninic acid functions as an aromatase inhibitor, of possible use in therapy for estrogen receptor-positive breast cancer in postmenopausal women, that methaneseleninic acid shows promise as a sensitizing agent for apoptosis induced by the Bcl-2-family inhibitor ABT-737 in several cancer lines, and that methaneseleninic acid restricts tumor growth in the nude mouse model of metastatic breast cancer and Lewis lung carcinoma in mice.

Methaneselenol (CH_{3}SeH) can be produced in vivo by reduction of methaneseleninic acid and may in fact be the key metabolite responsible for selenium's anticancer activity through generation of superoxide. The reduction of methaneseleninic acid by mammalian thioredoxin reductase has been studied.
