= Selenol =

Class of chemical compounds

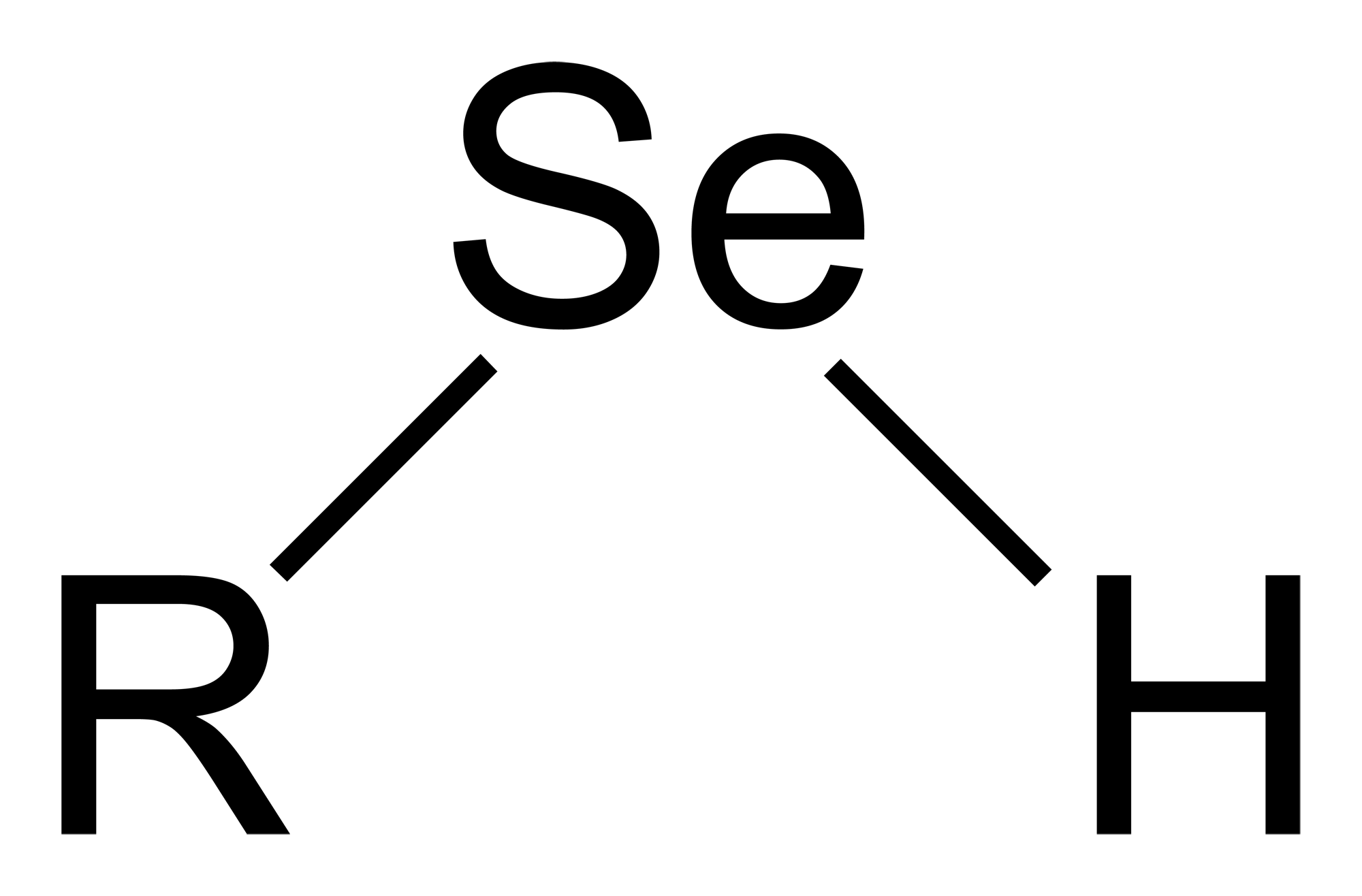
The structure of a generic selenol

Selenols are organic compounds that contain the functional group with the connectivity C−Se−H. Selenols are sometimes also called selenomercaptans and selenothiols. Selenols are one of the principal classes of organoselenium compounds. A well-known selenol is the amino acid selenocysteine.

== Structure and properties ==
Selenols are structurally similar to thiols, but the C−Se bond is about 8% longer at 196 pm. The C−Se−H angle approaches 90°. The bonding involves almost pure p-orbitals on Se, hence the near 90 angles. The Se−H bond energy is weaker than the S−H bond, consequently selenols are easily oxidized and serve as H-atom donors. The Se-H bond is weaker than the S−H bond as reflected in their respective bond dissociation energy (BDE). For C_{6}H_{5}Se−H, the BDE is 326 kJ/mol, while for C_{6}H_{5}S−H, the BDE is 368 kJ/mol.

Selenols are about 1000 times stronger acids than thiols: the pK_{a} of CH_{3}SeH is 5.2 vs 8.3 for CH_{3}SH. Deprotonation affords the selenolate anion, RSe^{−}, most examples of which are highly nucleophilic and rapidly oxidized by air.

The boiling points of selenols tend to be slightly greater than for thiols. This difference can be attributed to the increased importance of stronger van der Waals bonding for larger atoms. Volatile selenols have highly offensive odors.

== Applications and occurrence ==
Selenols have few commercial applications, being limited by the toxicity of selenium as well as the sensitivity of the Se−H bond. Their conjugate bases, the selenolates, also have limited applications in organic synthesis.

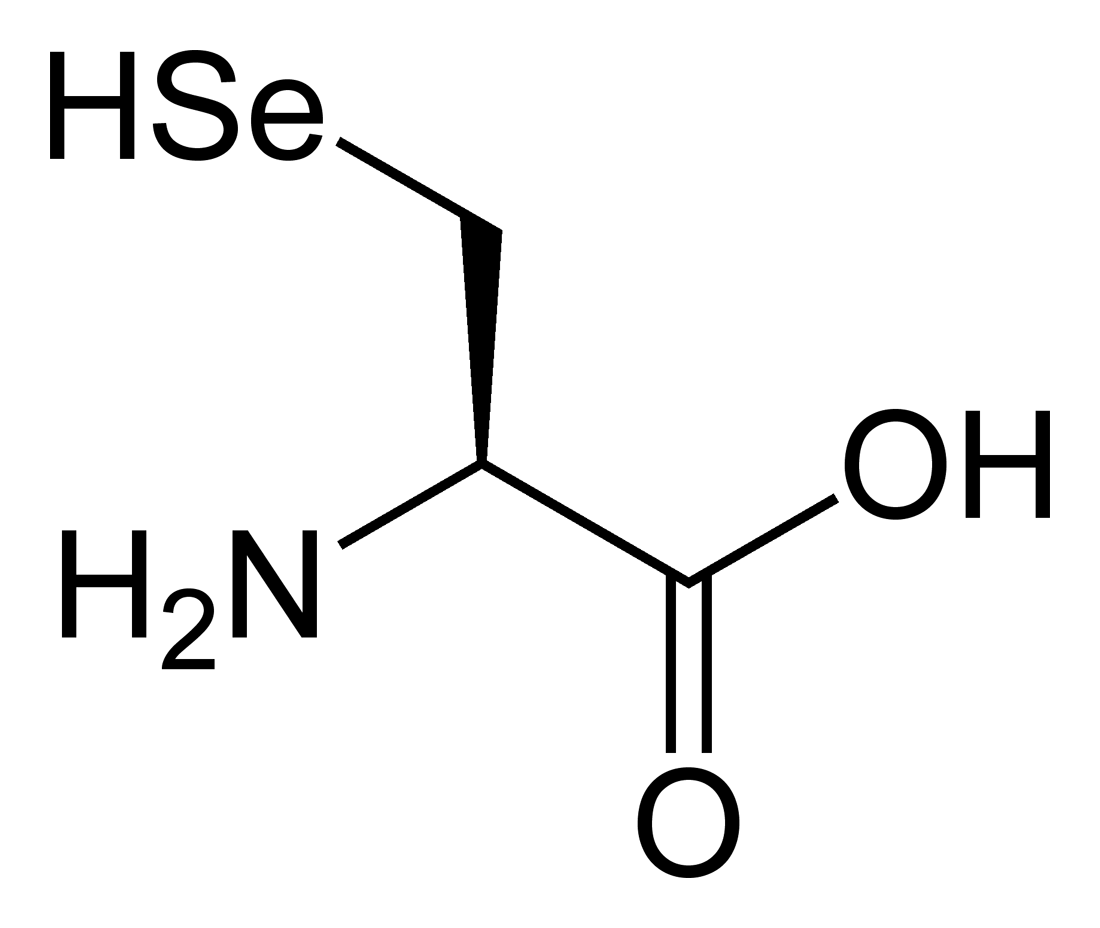
L-selenocysteine, a naturally occurring selenol

=== Biochemical role ===
Selenols are important in certain biological processes. Three enzymes found in mammals contain selenols at their active sites: glutathione peroxidase, iodothyronine deiodinase, and thioredoxin reductase. The selenols in these proteins are part of the essential amino acid selenocysteine. The selenols function as reducing agents to give selenenic acid derivative (RSe−OH), which in turn are re-reduced by thiol-containing enzymes. Methaneselenol (commonly named "methylselenol") (CH_{3}SeH), which can be produced in vitro by incubating selenomethionine with a bacterial methionine gamma-lyase (METase) enzyme, by biological methylation of selenide ion or in vivo by reduction of methaneseleninic acid (CH_{3}−Se(=O)−OH), has been invoked to explain the anticancer activity of certain organoselenium compounds. Precursors of methaneselenol are under active investigation in cancer prevention and therapy. In these studies, methaneselenol is found to be more biologically active than ethaneselenol (CH_{3}CH_{2}SeH) or 2-propaneselenol ((CH_{3})_{2}CH(SeH)).

== Preparation ==
Selenols are usually prepared by the reaction of organolithium reagents or Grignard reagents with elemental Se. For example, benzeneselenol is generated by the reaction of phenylmagnesium bromide with selenium followed by acidification:

Another preparative route to selenols involves the alkylation of selenourea, followed by hydrolysis.

Selenols are often generated by reduction of diselenides followed by protonation of the resulting selenolate:

2 RSe−SeR + 2 Li^{+}[HB(CH_{2}CH_{3})_{3}]^{−} → 2 RSe^{−}Li^{+} + 2 B(CH_{2}CH_{3})_{3} + H_{2}
RSe^{−}Li^{+} + HCl → RSeH + LiCl

Organic reductants for this reaction include hypophosphorous acid.

Dimethyl diselenide can be easily reduced to methaneselenol within cells.

== Reactions ==
Selenols are easily oxidized to diselenides, compounds containing an Se−Se bond. For example, treatment of benzeneselenol with bromine gives diphenyl diselenide.

2 C_{6}H_{5}SeH + Br_{2} → (C_{6}H_{5}Se)_{2} + 2 HBr

In the presence of base, selenols are readily alkylated to give selenides. This relationship is illustrated by the methylation of methaneselenol to give dimethylselenide.

== Safety ==
Organoselenium compounds (or any selenium compound) are cumulative poisons despite the fact that trace amounts of Se are required for health.

== See also ==
- Alcohol
- Thiol
- Tellurol
