= Organic selenocyanates =

Organic selenocyanates are organoselenium compounds with the general formula RSeCN. They are generally colorless, air-stable solids or liquids with repulsive odors. In terms of structure, synthesis, and reactivity, selenocyanates and thiocyanates behave similarly.

== Preparation ==
Alkyl selenocyanates are generally prepared by treatment of potassium selenocyanate with alkyl halides in alcohol or acetone solution. Aryl selenocyanates are generally prepared by treatment of potassium selenocyanate with aryl diazonium salts.

== Reactions ==
Organic selenocyanates can be reduced to the selenol, which readily oxidize to the diselenide:

RSeCN + 2 e^{−} → RSe^{−} + CN^{−}
RSe^{−} + H^{+} → RSeH
2 RSeH + 0.5 O_{2} → RSeSeR + H_{2}O

Oxidation of selenocyanates gives the seleninic acids.
