= Thiosulfonate =

Class of chemical compounds

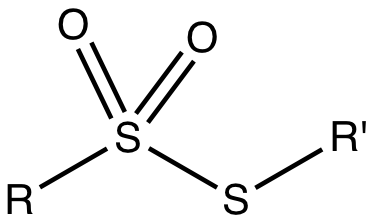
Structure of thiosulfonate ester.

Thiosulfonate esters are organosulfur compounds with the formula R−SO_{2}−S−R'. The parent member S-methyl methanethiosulfonate CH_{3}−SO_{2}−S−CH_{3} is a colorless liquid.

Thiosulfonate esters are usually produced by oxidation of disulfides or the nucleophilic attack of thiolates on organosulfonyl halides. The simplest thiosulfonate, CH_{3}SO_{2}SCH_{3} can however be prepared from dimethyl sulfoxide by treatment with oxalyl chloride.

Thiosulfonate also refers to the thiosulfonate anion R−S_{2}O^{−}_{2} and its salts. Alkali metal organylthiosulfonates are the salts of organylthiosulfonic acids (e.g., sodium methanethiosulfonate CH_{3}−S_{2}O^{−}_{2}Na^{+}). They are prepared by the reaction of organosulfonyl chlorides with sources of sulfide.

Oxidation with mCPBA gives disulfones.

== See also ==
- Bunte salts are related organosulfur compounds containing the anion with the formula R−S−SO^{−}_{3}
- Thiosulfinate a structurally analogous compound containing functional group in a lower oxidation state, with the formula R−S(O)−S−R
- S-methyl methanethiosulfonate CH_{3}−SO_{2}−S−CH_{3}
