= Selenosulfide =

Chemical compounds containing sulfur and selenium

Dimethyl selenosulfide, a simple selenosulfide found in some species of Allium.

In chemistry, a selenosulfide refers to distinct classes of inorganic and organic compounds containing sulfur and selenium. The organic derivatives contain Se-S bonds, whereas the inorganic derivatives are more variable.

== Organic selenosulfides ==
These species are classified as both organosulfur and organoselenium compounds. They are hybrids of organic disulfides and organic diselenides.

=== Preparation, structure, and reactivity ===
Selenosulfides have been prepared by the reaction of selenyl halides with thiols:

RSeCl + R'SH → RSeSR' + HCl

The equilibrium between diselenides and disulfides lies on the left:

RSeSeR + R'SSR' $\ce{<<=>}$ 2 RSeSR'

Because of the facility of this equilibrium, many of the best characterized examples of selenosulfides are cyclic, whereby S-Se bonds are stabilized intramolecularly. One example is the 1,8-selenosulfide of naphthalene. The selenium-sulfur bond length is about 220 picometers, the average of a typical S-S and Se-Se bond.

=== Occurrence ===
Selenosulfide groups can be found in almost all living organisms as part of various peroxidase enzymes, such as glutathione peroxidase and thioredoxin reductase. They are formed by the oxidative coupling of selenocysteine and cysteine residues. This reaction is powered by the decomposition of cellular peroxides, which can be highly damaging and a source of oxidative stress. Selenocysteine has a lower reduction potential than cysteine, making it very suitable for proteins that are involved in antioxidant activity.

Selenosulfides have been identified in some species of Allium and in roasted coffee. The mammalian version of the protein thioredoxin reductase contains a selenocysteine residue which forms a thioselenide (analogous to a disulfide) upon oxidation.

== Inorganic selenosulfides ==
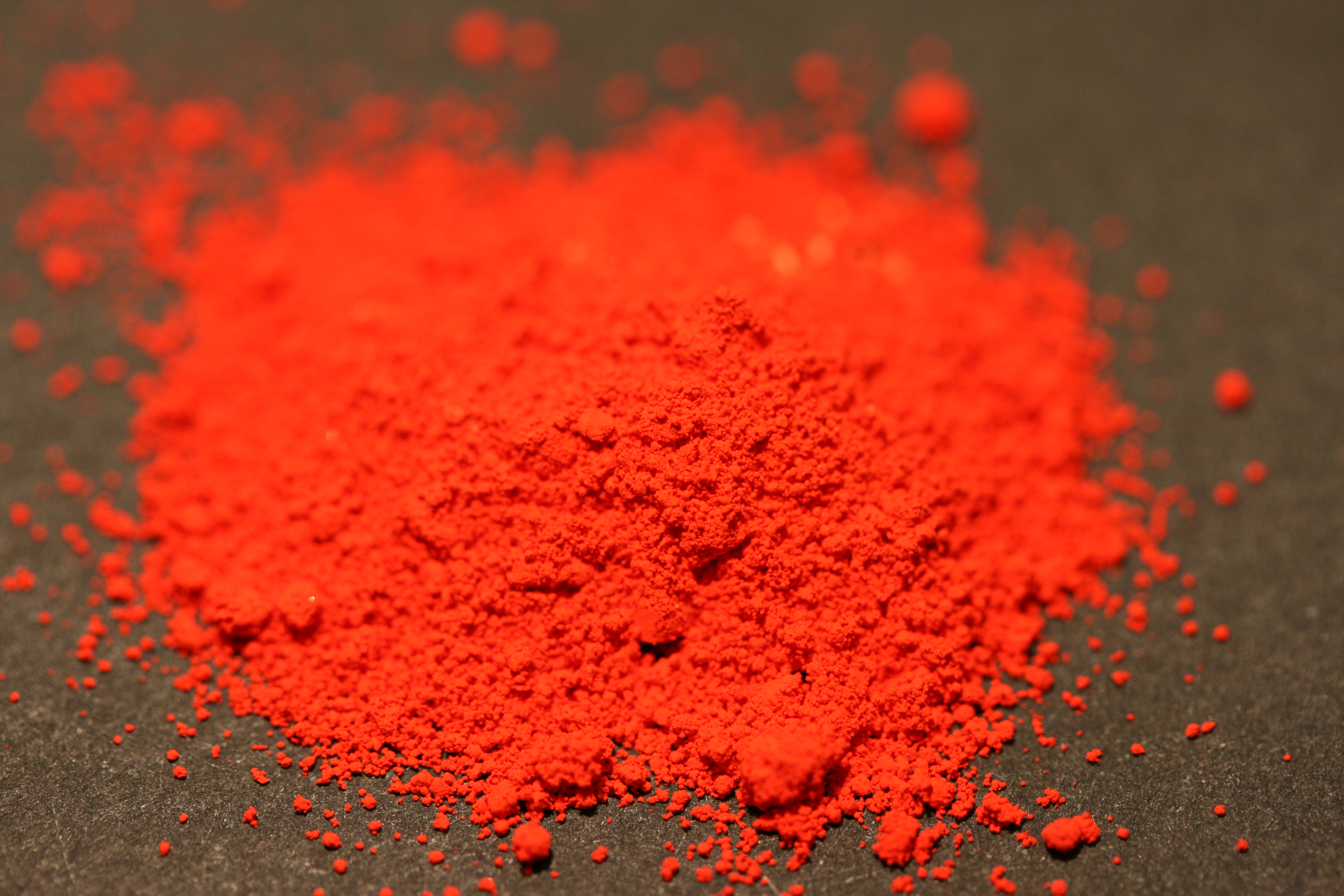
Cadmium red pigment

Some inorganic selenide sulfide compounds are also known. Simplest is the material selenium sulfide, which has medicinal properties. It adopt the diverse structures of elemental sulfur but with some S atoms replaced by Se.

Other inorganic selenide sulfide compounds occur as minerals and as pigments. One example is antimony selenosulfide.

The pigment cadmium red consists of cadmium sulfoselenide. It is a solid solution of cadmium sulfide, which is yellow, and cadmium selenide, which is dark brown. It is used as an artist's pigment. Unlike the organic selenosulfides and unlike selenide sulfide itself, no S-Se bond exists in CdS_{1−x}Se_{x} or in Sb_{2}S_{3−x}Se_{x}.
