= Disulfide =

Functional group with the chemical structure R–S–S–R′

In chemistry, a disulfide (or disulphide in British English) is a compound containing a R-S-S-R′ functional group or the S_{2}^{2−} anion. In inorganic chemistry, the anion appears in the common mineral pyrite but is otherwise rare. Compounds of the form R-S-S-H are usually called persulfides instead.

Disulfide bridges also appear as a common post-translational modification in proteins.

== Organic disulfides ==
A selection of organic disulfides

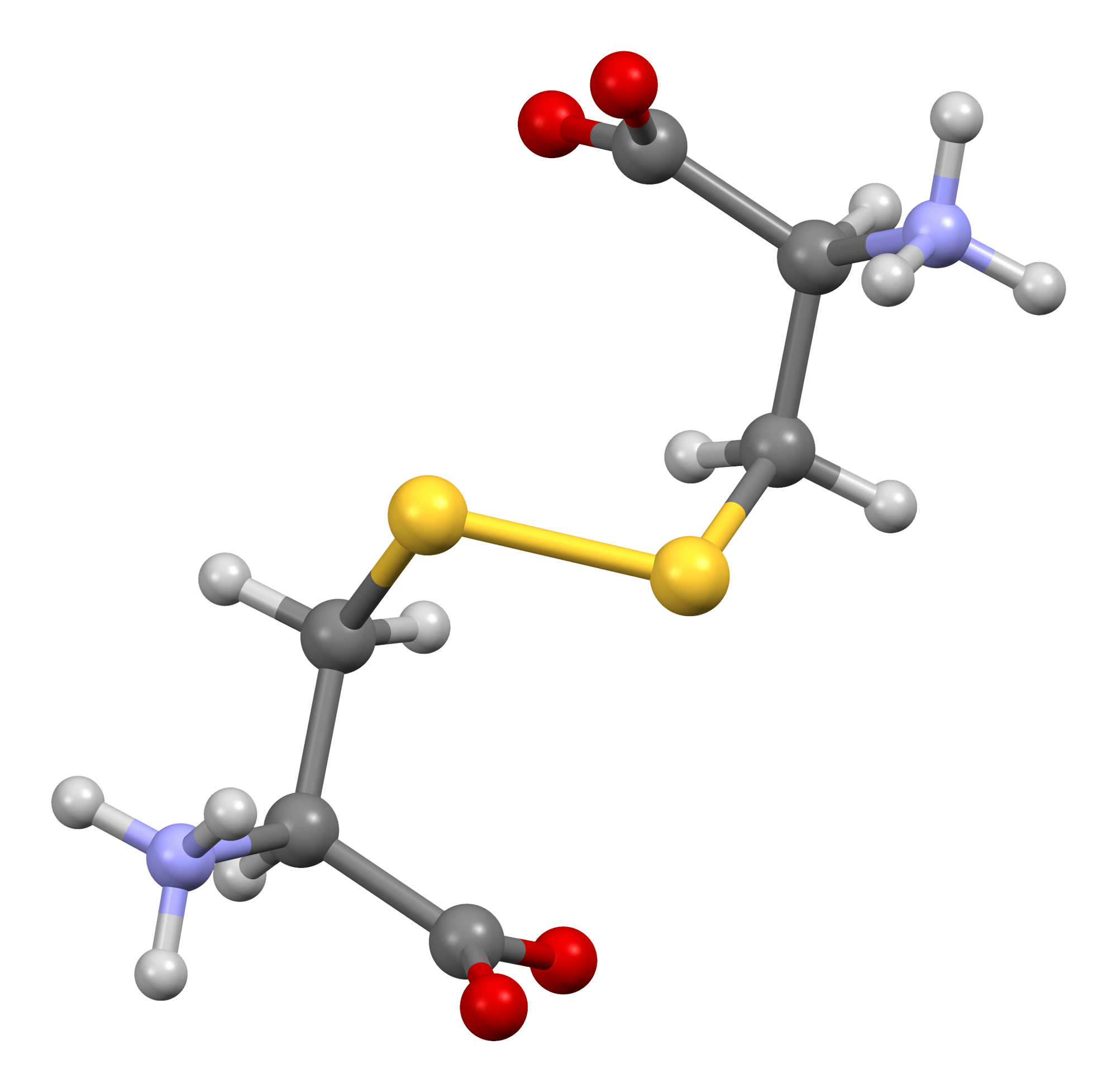
Cystine, crosslinker in many proteins

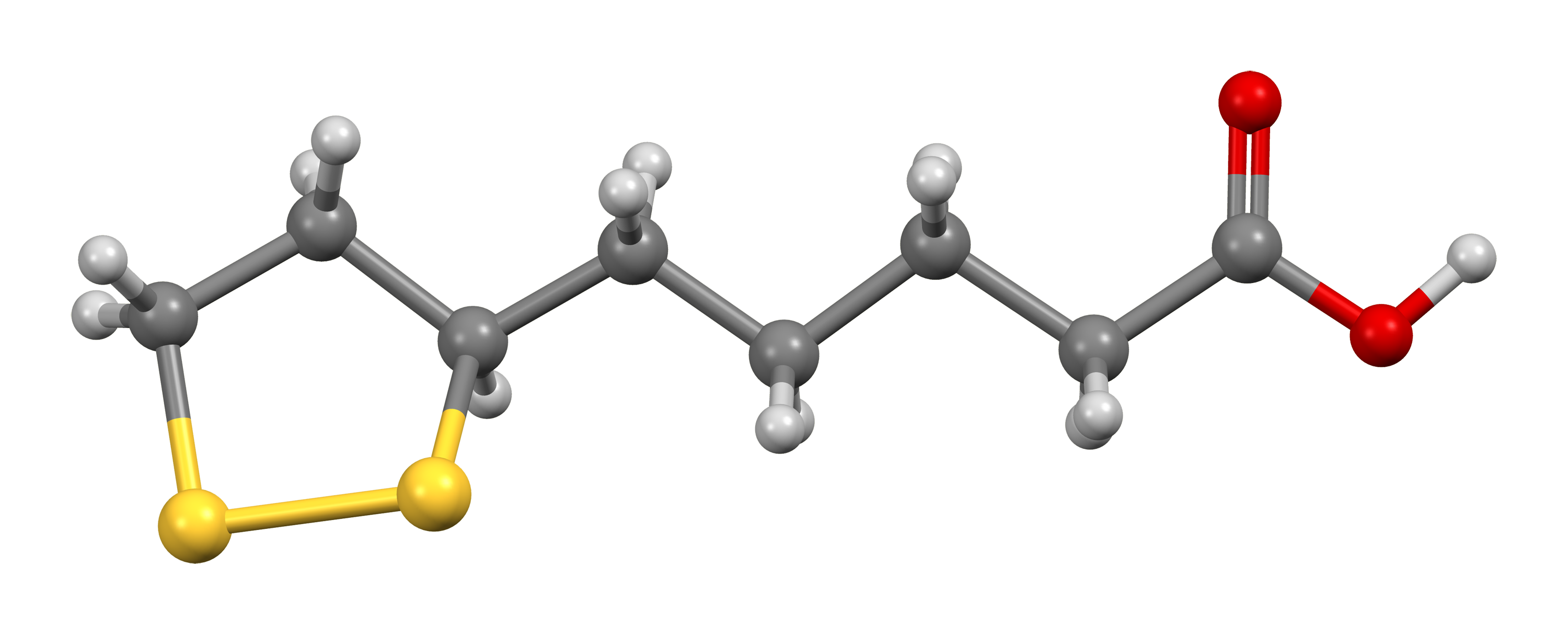
Lipoic acid, an enzyme cofactor

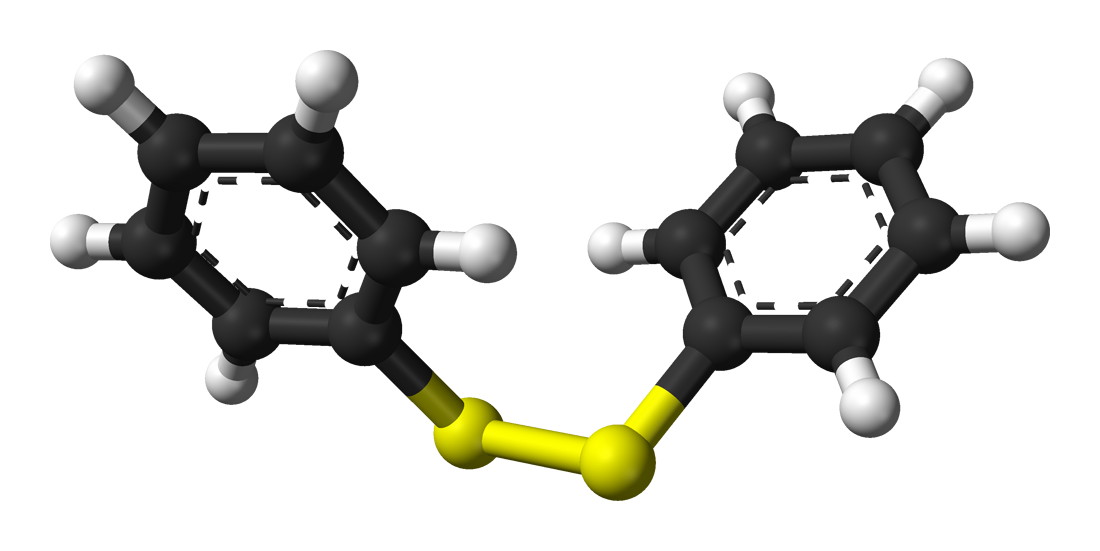
Diphenyl disulfide, (C_{6}H_{5})_{2}S_{2}, a common organic disulfide

=== Structure ===
Disulfides have a C–S–S–C dihedral angle approaching 90°. The S–S bond length is 2.03 Å (203 pm) in diphenyl disulfide, similar to that in elemental sulfur.

Disulfides are usually symmetric but they can also be unsymmetric. Symmetrical disulfides are compounds of the formula RSSR. Most disulfides encountered in organosulfur chemistry are symmetrical disulfides. Unsymmetrical disulfides (also called heterodisulfides or mixed disulfides) are compounds of the formula RSSR'. Unsymmetrical disulfide are less common in organic chemistry, but many disulfides in nature are unsymmetrical.

==== Cyclic disulfides ====
Disulfides can be components of rings. Lipoic acid, a 1,2-dithiolane is a major example. Rings with more than one disulfide usually tend to polymerize.

==== Other specialized organic disulfides ====
Thiuram disulfides, with the formula (R_{2}NCSS)_{2}, are disulfides but they behave distinctly because of the thiocarbonyl group.

=== Properties ===
Disulfide bonds are strong, with a typical bond dissociation energy of 251 kJ/mol (60 kcal/mol). However, being about 40% weaker than C-C and C-H bonds, the disulfide bond is often the "weak link" in many molecules. Furthermore, reflecting the polarizability of divalent sulfur, the S-S bond is susceptible to scission by polar reagents, both electrophiles and especially nucleophiles (Nu):

RS−SR + Nu^{−} → RS−Nu + RS^{−}

The disulfide bond is about 2.05 Å (205 pm) in length, about 0.5 Å (50 pm) longer than a C-C bond. Rotation about the S-S axis is subject to a low barrier. Disulfides show a distinct preference for dihedral angles approaching 90°. When the angle approaches 0° or 180°, then the disulfide is a significantly better oxidant.

Disulfides where the two R groups are the same are called symmetric, examples being diphenyl disulfide and dimethyl disulfide. When the two R groups are not identical, the compound is said to be an asymmetric or mixed disulfide.

Although the hydrogenation of disulfides is usually not practical, the equilibrium constant for the reaction provides a measure of the standard redox potential for disulfides:

RSSR + H_{2} → 2 RSH

This value is about −250 mV versus the standard hydrogen electrode (pH = 7). By comparison, the standard reduction potential for ferrodoxins is about −430 mV.

=== Synthesis ===
Disulfide bonds are usually formed from the oxidation of thiol (-SH) groups, especially in biological contexts. The transformation is depicted as follows:

2 RSH ⇌ RS−SR + 2 H^{+} + 2 e^{−}

A variety of oxidants participate in this reaction including oxygen and hydrogen peroxide. Such reactions are thought to proceed via sulfenic acid intermediates. In the laboratory, iodine in the presence of base is commonly employed to oxidize thiols to disulfides. Several metals, such as copper(II) and iron(III) complexes affect this reaction. Alternatively, disulfide bonds in proteins often formed by thiol-disulfide exchange:

RS−SR + R′SH ⇌ R′S−SR + RSH

Such reactions are mediated by enzymes in some cases and in other cases are under equilibrium control, especially in the presence of a catalytic amount of base.

The alkylation of alkali metal di- and polysulfides gives disulfides. "Thiokol" polymers arise when sodium polysulfide is treated with an alkyl dihalide. In the converse reaction, carbanionic reagents react with elemental sulfur to afford mixtures of the thioether, disulfide, and higher polysulfides. These reactions are often unselective but can be optimized for specific applications.

=== Synthesis of unsymmetrical disulfides (heterodisulfides) ===
Many specialized methods have been developed for forming unsymmetrical disulfides. Reagents that deliver the equivalent of "RS^{+}" react with thiols to give asymmetrical disulfides:

RSH + R′SNR″_{2} → RS−SR′ + HNR″_{2}

where R″_{2}N is the phthalimido group. Bunte salts, derivatives of the type RSSO_{3}^{−}Na^{+} are also used to generate unsymmetrical disulfides:

Na[O_{3}S_{2}R] + NaSR′ → RSSR′ + Na_{2}SO_{3}

=== Reactions ===
The most important aspect of disulfide bonds is their scission, as the S-S bond is usually the weakest bond in an organic molecule. Many specialized organic reactions have been developed to cleave the bond.

A variety of reductants reduce disulfides to thiols. Hydride agents are typical reagents, and a common laboratory demonstration "uncooks" eggs with sodium borohydride. Alkali metals effect the same reaction more aggressively:

RS-SR + 2 Na → 2 NaSR

followed by protonation of the resulting metal thiolate:

NaSR + HCl → HSR + NaCl

In biochemistry labwork, thiols such as β-mercaptoethanol (β-ME) or dithiothreitol (DTT) serve as reductants through thiol-disulfide exchange. The thiol reagents are used in excess to drive the equilibrium to the right:

RS−SR + 2 HOCH_{2}CH_{2}SH ⇌ HOCH_{2}CH_{2}S−SCH_{2}CH_{2}OH + 2 RSH

The reductant tris(2-carboxyethyl)phosphine (TCEP) is useful, beside being odorless compared to β-ME and DTT, because it is selective, working at both alkaline and acidic conditions (unlike DTT), is more hydrophilic and more resistant to oxidation in air. Furthermore, it is often not needed to remove TCEP before modification of protein thiols.

In Zincke cleavage, halogens oxidize disulfides to a sulfenyl halide:

ArSSAr + Cl2 → 2 ArSCl

More unusually, oxidation of disulfides gives first thiosulfinates and then thiosulfonates:

RSSR + [O] → RS(=O)SR
RS(=O)SR + [O] → RS(=O)_{2}SR

==== Thiol–disulfide exchange ====
In thiol–disulfide exchange, a thiolate group −S^{−} displaces one sulfur atom in a disulfide bond -S-S-. The original disulfide bond is broken, and its other sulfur atom is released as a new thiolate, carrying away the negative charge. Meanwhile, a new disulfide bond forms between the attacking thiolate and the original sulfur atom.

Thiol–disulfide exchange showing the linear intermediate in which the charge is shared among the three sulfur atoms. The thiolate group (shown in red) attacks a sulfur atom (shown in blue) of the disulfide bond, displacing the other sulfur atom (shown in green) and forming a new disulfide bond.

Thiolates, not thiols, attack disulfide bonds. Hence, thiol–disulfide exchange is inhibited at low pH (typically, below 8) where the protonated thiol form is favored relative to the deprotonated thiolate form. (The pK_{a} of a typical thiol group is roughly 8.3, but can vary due to its environment.) Thiol-disulfide exchange is an important process for the formation of the correct disulfide bridges in proteins and to keep cysteine from unwanted oxidation during lab experiments.

=== Nomenclature and misnomers ===
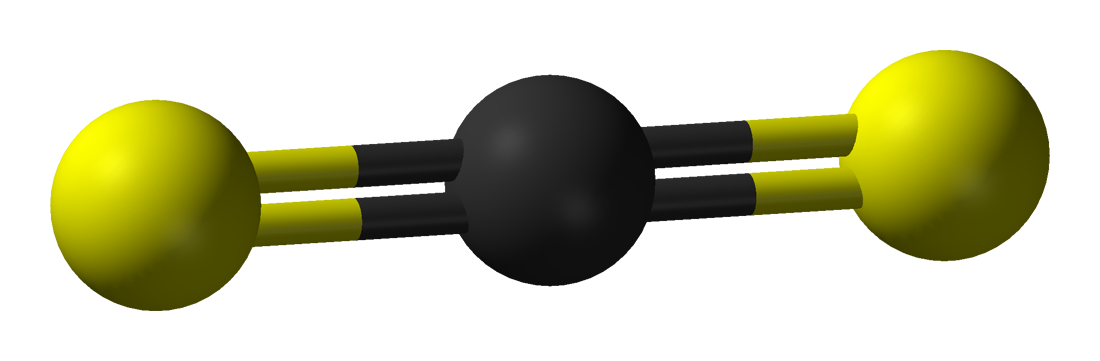
CS_{2}

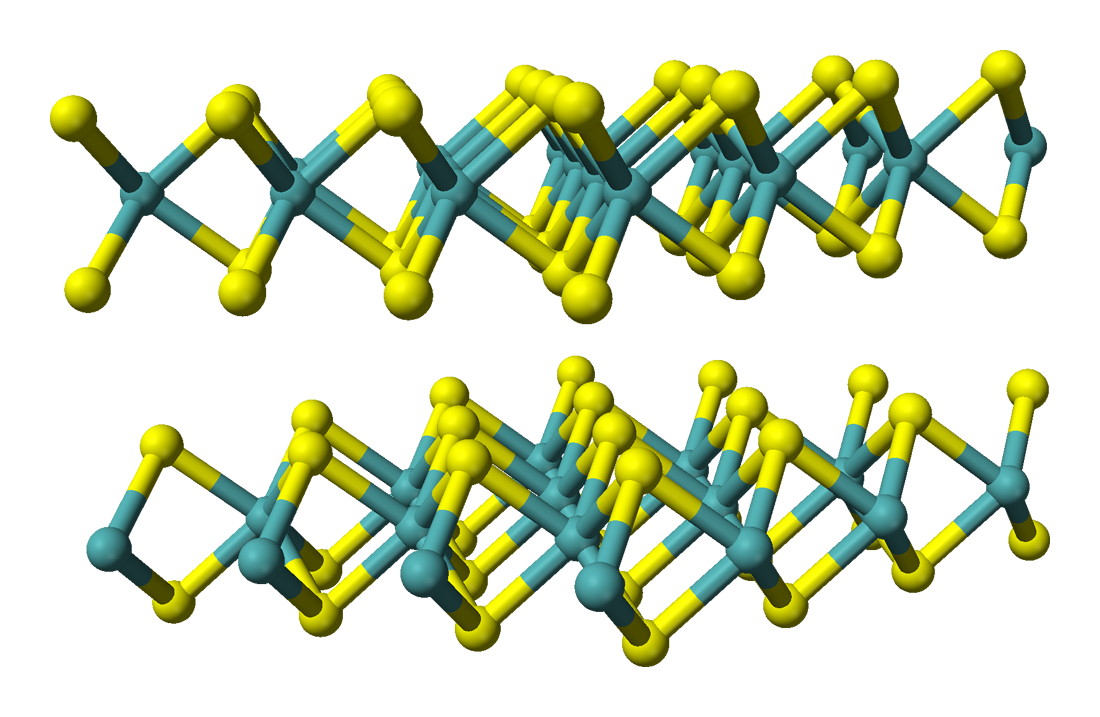
MoS_{2}

Thiosulfoxides are isomeric with disulfides, having the second sulfur branching from the first and not partaking in a continuous chain, i.e. RR'S=S rather than R−S−S−R'.

Compounds with three sulfur atoms, such as CH_{3}S-S-SCH_{3}, are called trisulfides. More extended species are well known, especially in rings.

Disulfide is also used to refer to compounds that contain two sulfide (S^{2−}) centers. The compound carbon disulfide, CS_{2} is described with the structural formula i.e. S=C=S. This molecule is not a disulfide in the sense that it lacks a S-S bond. Similarly, molybdenum disulfide, MoS_{2}, is not a disulfide in the sense again that its sulfur atoms are not linked.

Disulfide bonds are analogous but more common than related peroxide, thioselenide, and diselenide bonds. Intermediate compounds of these also exist, for example thioperoxides such as hydrogen thioperoxide, have the formula ROSR' (equivalently R'SOR). These are isomeric to sulfoxides in a similar manner to the above; i.e. RR'S=O rather than R−S−O−R'.

== Inorganic disulfides ==
A selection of disulfides

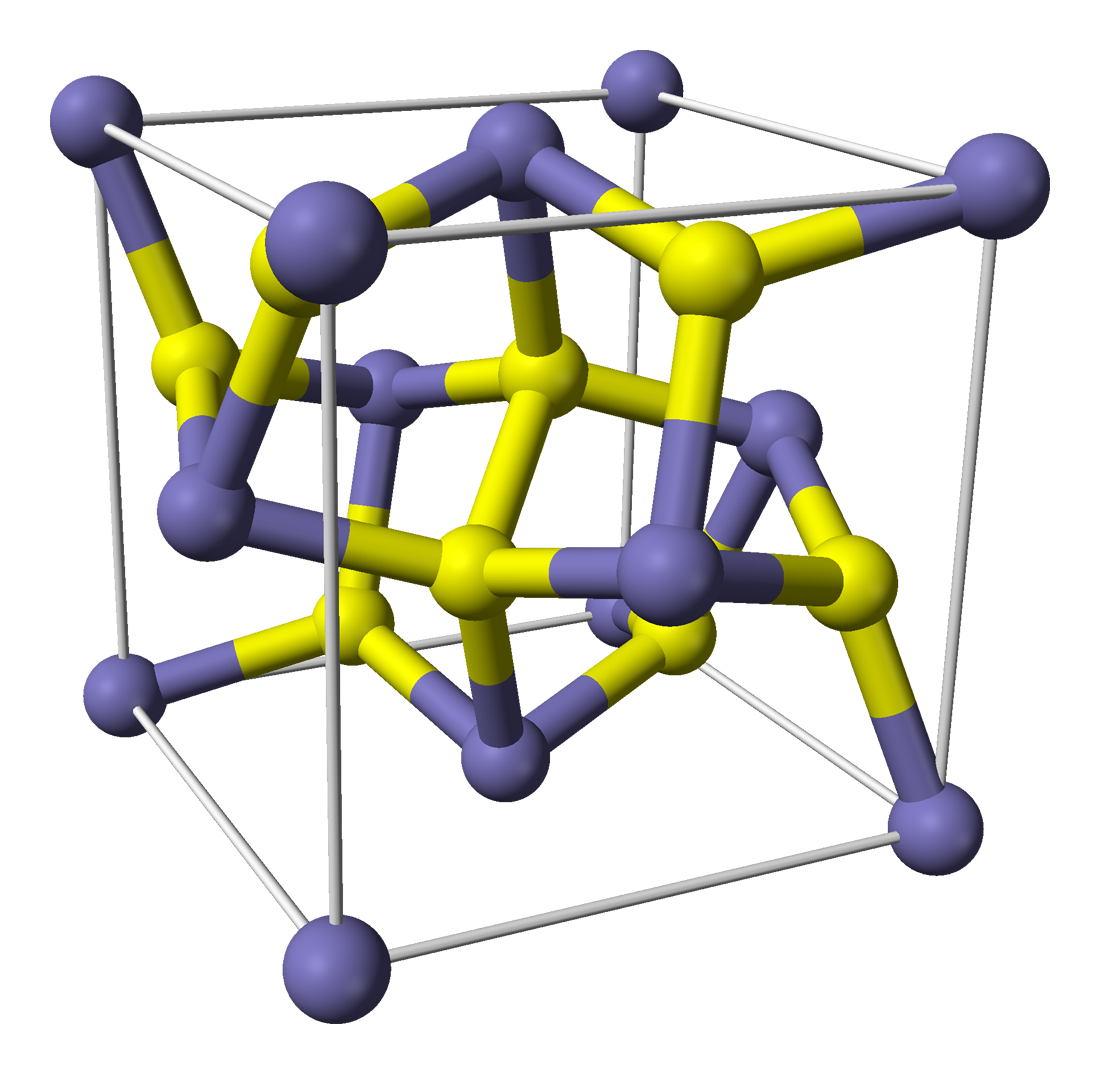
Pyrite, FeS_{2}, "fool's gold". Color code: yellow = S, violet = Fe

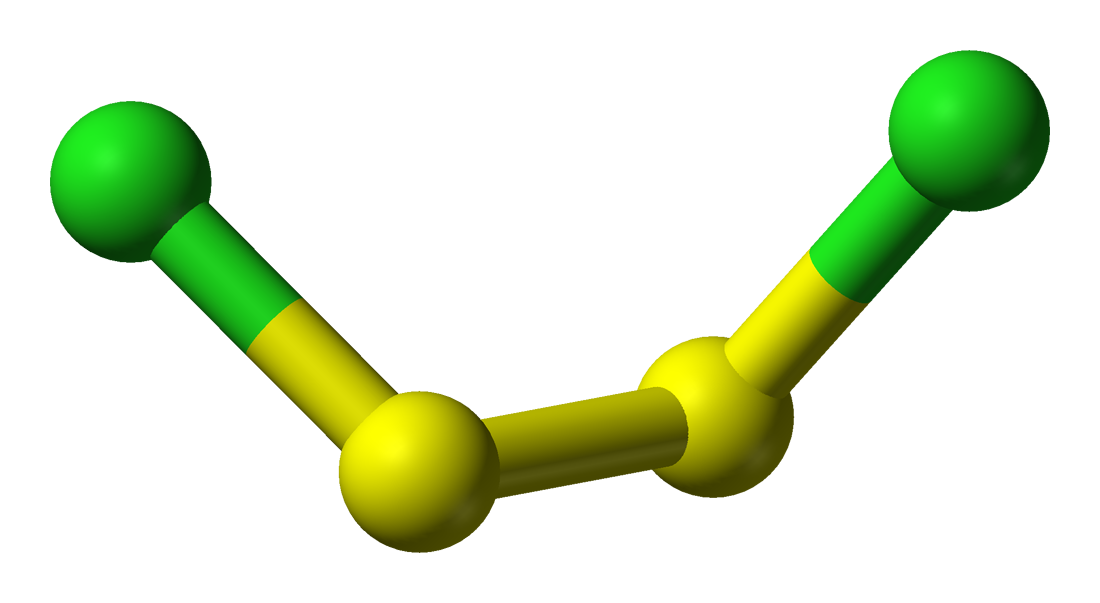
Disulfur dichloride, S_{2}Cl_{2}, a common industrial chemical

The disulfide anion is S_{2}^{2−}, or ^{−}S-S^{−}. In disulfide, sulfur exists in the reduced state with oxidation number −1. Its electron configuration then resembles that of a chlorine atom. It thus tends to form a covalent bond with another S^{−} center to form S_{2}^{2−} group, similar to elemental chlorine existing as the diatomic Cl_{2}. Oxygen may also behave similarly, e.g. in peroxides such as H_{2}O_{2}. Examples of inorganic disulfides include:

- Hydrogen disulfide (S_{2}H_{2}), the simplest inorganic disulfide
- Disulfur dichloride (S_{2}Cl_{2}), a distillable liquid.
- Iron disulfide (FeS_{2}), or pyrite.

== Applications ==
Aside from the major role in biology, disulfides are found in rubber that has been vulcanized with sulfur. The vulcanization of rubber results in crosslinking groups which consist of disulfide (and polysulfide) bonds; in analogy to the role of disulfides in proteins, the S−S linkages in rubber strongly affect the stability and rheology of the material. In particular, a greater degree of crosslinking corresponds to a stronger and more rigid material.

== See also ==
- Thiosulfinate – Functional group
- Diselenides in organoselenium chemistry
