= Reduction-sensitive nanoparticles =

Drug delivery method

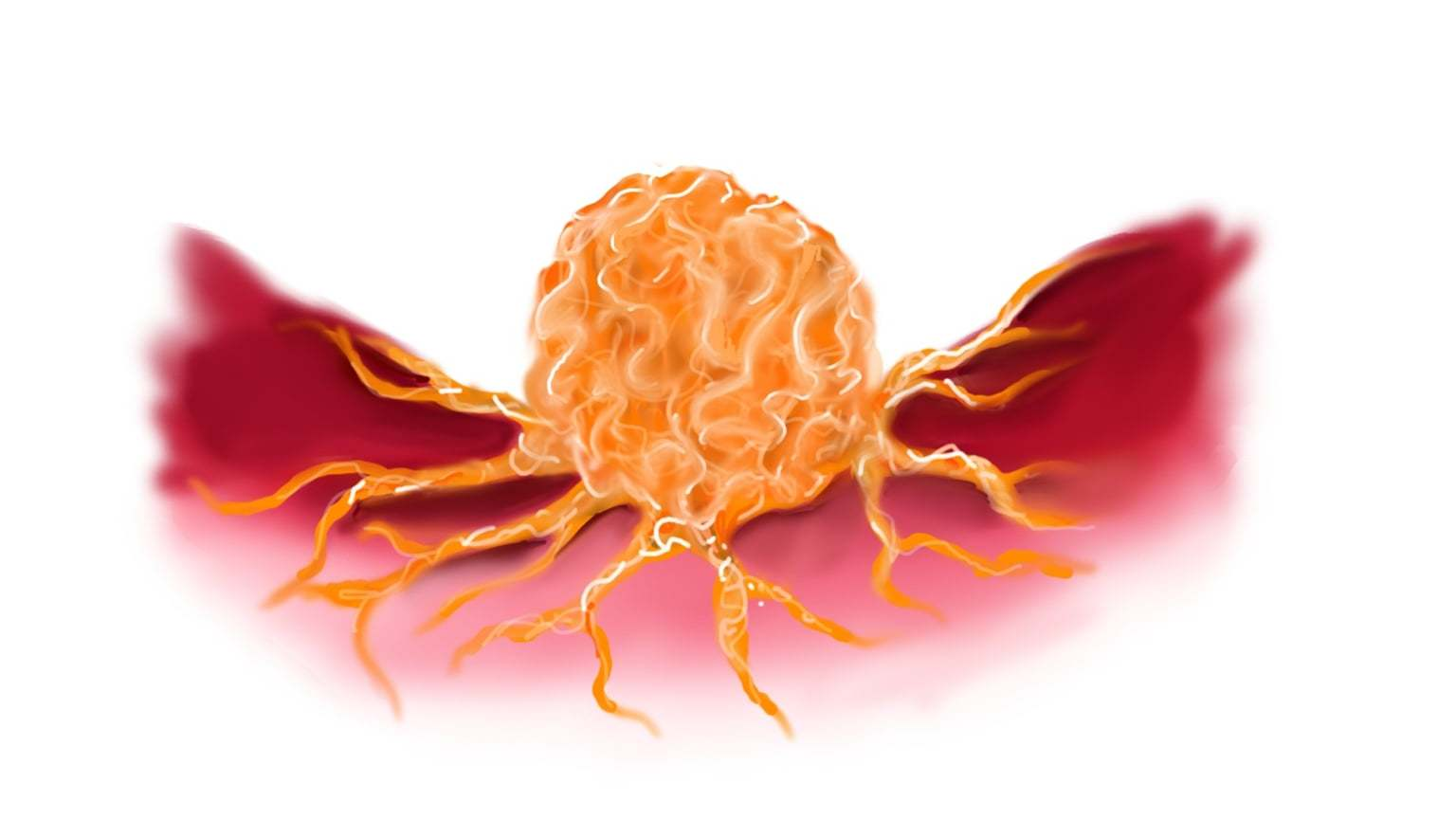
Fig. 1.0 Cancer Cell

Reduction-sensitive nanoparticles (RSNP) consist of nanocarriers that are chemically responsive to reduction. Drug delivery systems using RSNP can be loaded with different drugs that are designed to be released within a concentrated reducing environment, such as the tumor-targeted microenvironment. Reduction-Sensitive Nanoparticles provide an efficient method of targeted drug delivery for the improved controlled release of medication within localized areas of the body.

== Redox sensitive nanoparticles vs. reduction sensitive nanoparticles ==
Nanoparticles are small in size with maximized surface area and have an enhanced level of solubility; these elements result in an improved bioavailability. Reduction-sensitive nanoparticles are nanoparticles that are responsive to reduction signalling environments. Redox-sensitive nanoparticles can be responsive to signalling through a reduction activation or an oxidative activation. Therefore, degradation of chemical bonds can be either activated through oxidants or reductants in the localized area. The cleavage/degradation of chemical bonds will enable the drugs loaded within the nanoparticle to be released into the body. Depending on the activation mechanism, redox-sensitive nanoparticles can be associated with reduction-sensitive nanoparticles if the chemical activation method is through reduction.

== Nanoparticle drug loading ==
Nanoparticle Drug Loading is dependent on the mass ratio of the drug being loaded and the drug-loaded nanoparticle. Variations necessary to consider are the pore volume size, the surface, shape, and charge of the nanoparticle. The mode of drug loading will depend on the type of drug being administered, which will vary depending on the illness that is treated.

== Drug Release ==
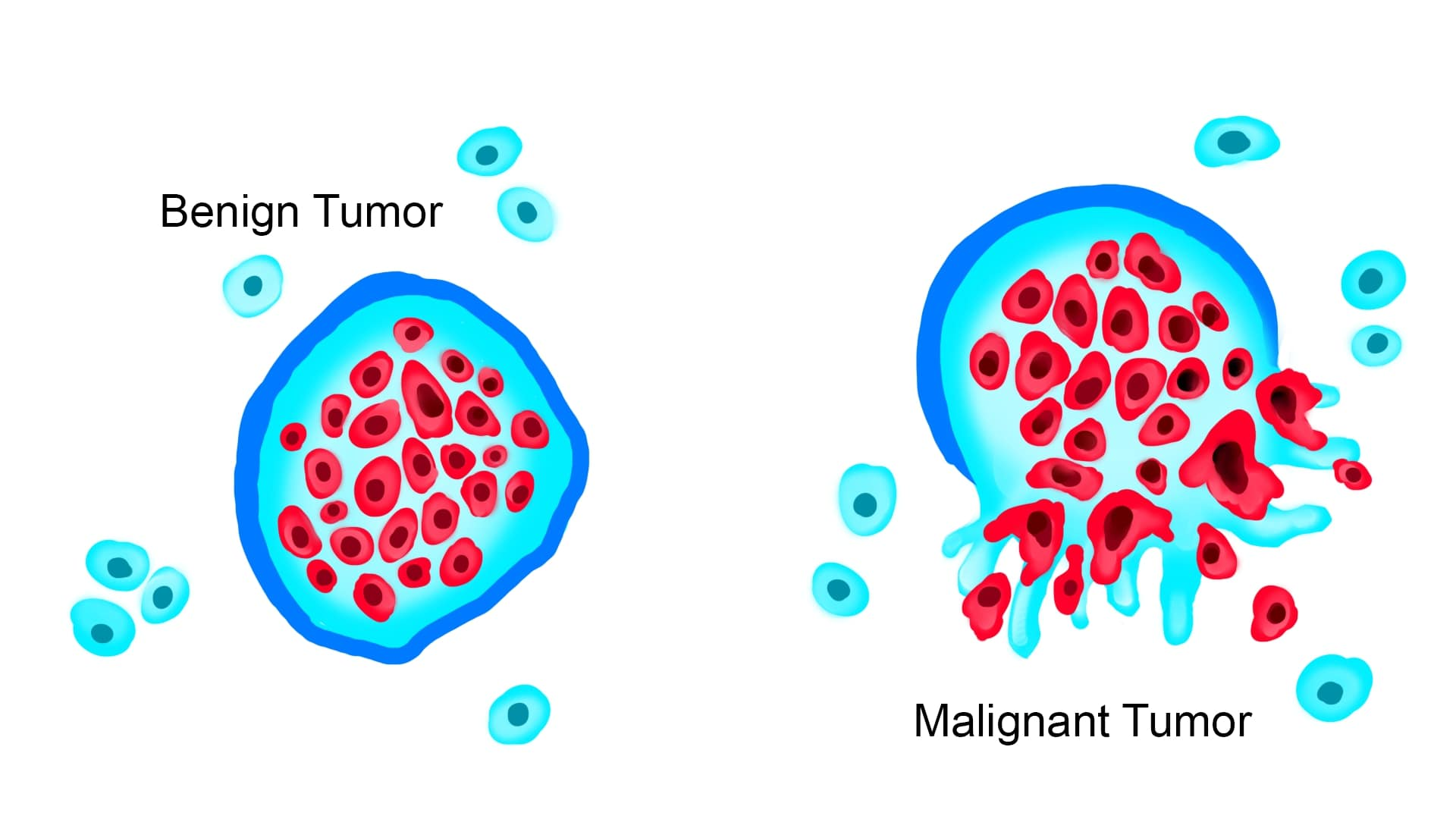
Fig. 2.0 Benign and Malignant Tumor Cells

One of the limitations of nanoparticles for drug delivery is the insufficient or slow release of drugs. The rate of release is a critical element to identify how slowed drug release could limit the proper concentration of treatment. If the drug is not administered in concentrations high enough it could result in undertreatment of tumor cells with little to no effect. Concentration thresholds must be met to initiate cell death amongst tumor cells. However, the uncontrolled release of treatment could also permit adverse side effects. RSNPs have improved rates of drug release which improves the medication concentrations that can be administered to a specific area.

RSNPs consist of reduction or redox-sensitive bonds. After administration in the body, the RSNP will eventually come into contact with the tumor microenvironment (TME). Nanoparticles can be synthesized to activate when exposed to selective characteristics of the tumor microenvironments. TMEs depict unique characteristics that create a differing microenvironment in comparison to healthy tissue. Thus, nanoparticles can be designed to react to the unique elements of TMEs such as the formation of a reducing environment. The reducing abilities of the TMEs are due to the expression of reducing agents. RSNPs are formulated to express reduction-sensitive bonds that are cleaved when exposed to reducing agents. After the reduction occurs the degradation of the nanoparticles commences and the loaded drugs begin to release.

== Physicochemical characterization ==
=== RSNPs ===
The physicochemical characteristics of nanoparticles are inclusive of the size, shape, chemical composition, stability, topography, surface charge, and surface area. Deviations of these characteristics can be impacted by the classification of the nanoparticle. For example, the RSNP can be classified as a polymeric, micelle, or lipid-polymeric hybrid. The reduction sensitivity of nanoparticles is reliant on the reduction-responsive chemical structures infused into the nanoparticle. Reduction occurs when the number of electrons increases in a chemical species. Reduction sensitive nanoparticles depict high plasma stability and quick responsiveness/activation. The reducing environment of tumor cells is greatly impacted by the oxidation and reduction states of NADPH/NADP+ and Glutathione.

=== Tumor microenvironment ===
For the effective application of RSNPs, the physicochemical characteristics of the tumor microenvironment must also be considered. The characteristics depicted by the TME are tumor hypoxia, angiogenesis, metabolism, acidosis, reactive oxygen species (ROS), etc. The elements of the tumor microenvironment can affect the reduction-inducing environment. Tumor cells abnormally regulate redox homeostasis leading to differences in the redox balance and increases in ROS levels. Research trends have shown that increased levels of ROS are correlated with high levels of antioxidant activity, such as intracellular GSH.

=== Reducing agents ===
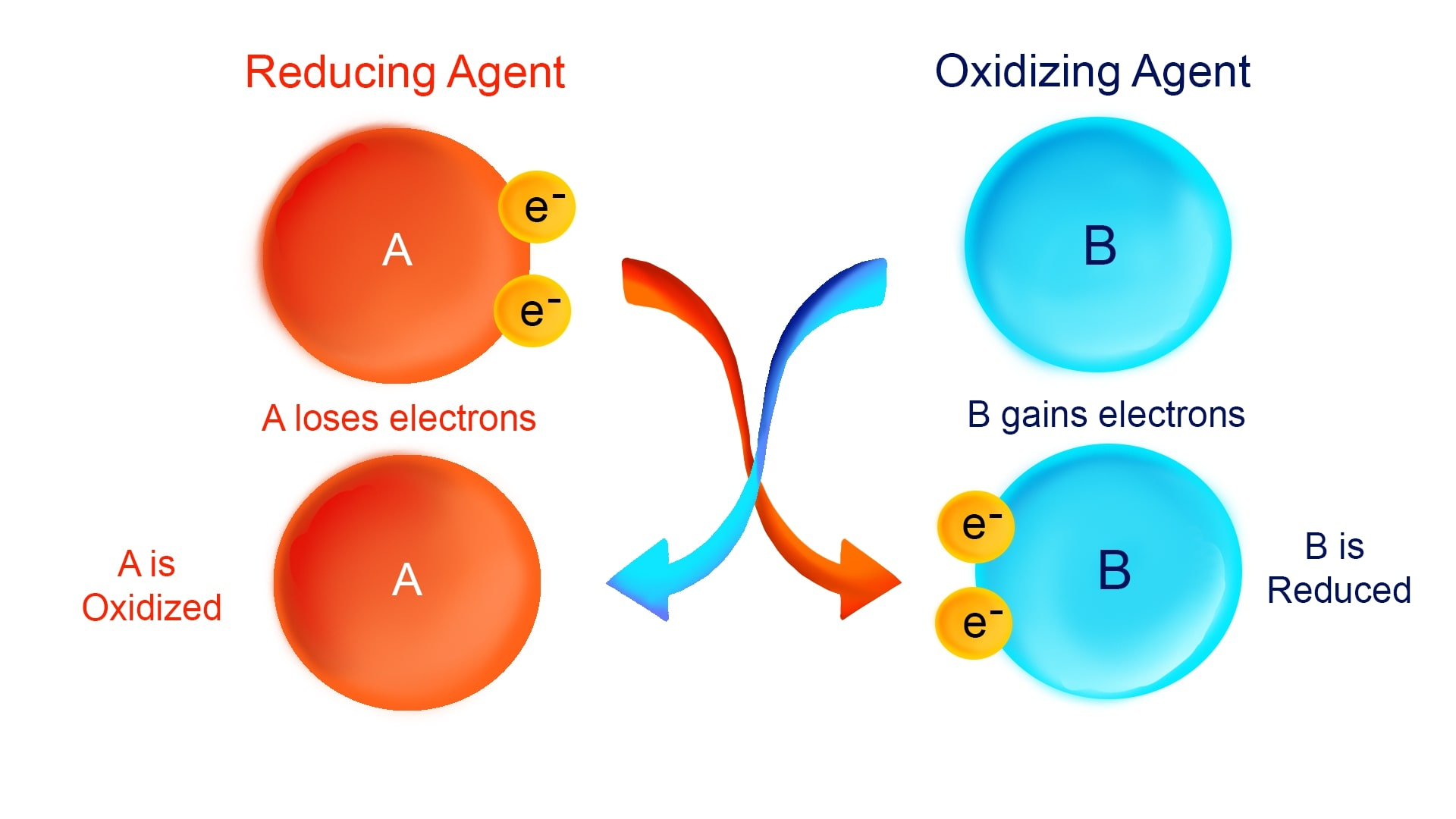
Fig. 3.0 Reduction and Oxidation

Glutathione (GSH) or γ-glutamyl-cysteinyl-glycine is a critical biological reducing agent for drug delivery applications; it creates an effective reducing environment in the cytosol and nucleus of a cell. Glutathione is an antioxidant that is naturally produced in the liver and takes part in tissue building, tissue repair, immune responses, chemical production, and protein production. GSH is also a significant signaler of cell differentiation, proliferation, apoptosis, and ferroptosis. Furthermore, the glutathione concentration in the tumor microenvironment is reportedly at least four times higher compared to regular tissue. This is due to the high metabolic needs of tumor cells; for example, the rapid proliferation rates of tumor cells.

The over-expression of nicotinamide adenine dinucleotide phosphate NADPH can lead to higher ROS levels. NADPH has a lower concentration than GSH in the reducing environment. NADPH is an electron donor that exists among all organisms; additionally, the NADPH is used as a source of reduction to drive anabolic reactions and redox balances. The reduction and oxidation states of NADPH/NADP+ will influence the reduced responsiveness of the environment. Cancer cells express a unique NADPH homeostasis due to the adaptive alterations of signaling pathways and metabolic enzymes.

== Subtypes ==
=== Reduction sensitive bonds ===
==== Disulfide bonds ====
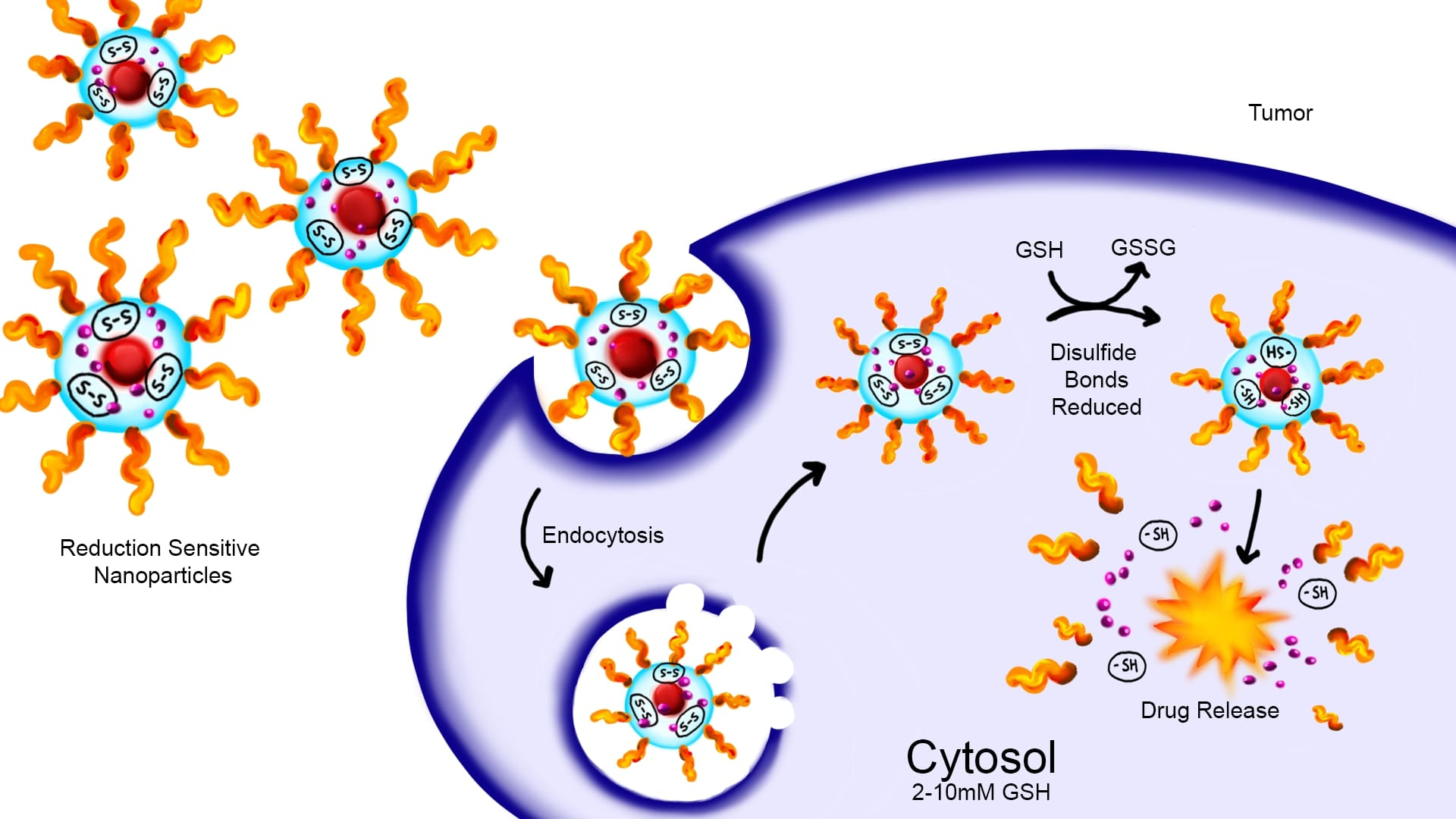
Fig. 4.0 Drug Release of RSNP with Disulfide Bonds in the Cytosol

Redox-Sensitive Nanoparticles with Disulfide bonds are commonly observed in medical research. RSNP can consist of disulfide bonds that are cleaved and introduced to a reduction condition. Additionally, the reduction of glutathione results in the formation of sulfhydryl groups. In large concentrations of GSH, the disulfide bonds are capable of being cleaved. Following the activation process, the degradation of the drug carrier results in the drug release. These linkages are commonly used between hydrophilic and hydrophobic segments in copolymers. Moreover, RSNP's hydrophilic shells will degrade in response to the reducing environment. The disulfide bonds are used as linkers and cross-linking agents. Disulfide bonds can be expressed attached to the side chains, the backbone, on the surface, and as linkages between moieties.

Disulfide bonds can also act as cross-linking agents in micelles nanoparticles. Micelles lack the structural stability as a nanocarrier for drug delivery. The lack of stability can result in the loss of drugs after administration and before reaching the infected area. This occurrence can potentially cause adverse side effects from the improper release of medication. Disulfide bonds can be used as crosslinked structures to increase the structural stability of micelle nanocarriers. In general, these crosslinks are located in the shell or the core of micelles nanoparticles.

==== Diselenide bonds ====
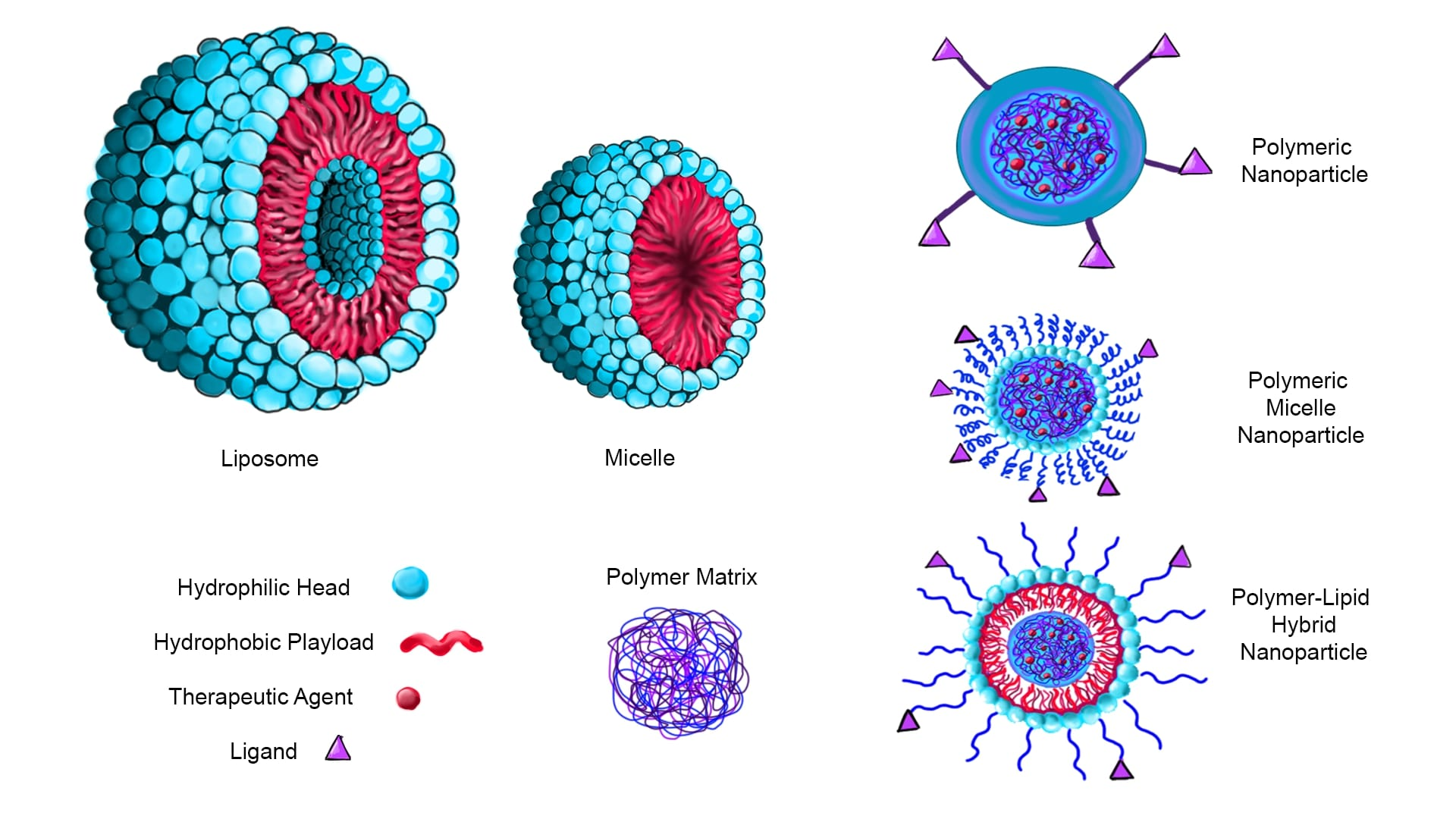
Fig. 5.0 Relevant Nanoparticle Subtypes

Redox-Sensitive Nanoparticles with Diselenide bonds share comparable reduction responsiveness to disulfide bonds. Diselenide consists of two selenium atoms along with an additional element or radical. Diselenide bonds are dynamic covalent bonds that can be exchange between molecules. Diselenide bonds have an estimated bond energy of 172 kJ/mol, and disulfide bonds have estimated bond energy of 268 kJ/mol; the lower bond energy holds a higher potential to design an increased sensitive redox-responsive delivery. Diselenide bonds have been observed to be attached to hydrophobic parts of amphiphilic triblocks or hyperbranched copolymers to create micelles.

==== Succinimide-thioether bonds ====
Succinimide-thioether linkages express sensitivity to reducing environments and can be cleaved as a result. Succinimide-thioether bonds show slower rates of release in comparison to disulfide bonds; however, succinimide-thioether nanoparticles are still sensitive to the reducing environment and are cleaved by GSH for fast intracellular release.

==== Trimethyl benzoquinone bonds ====
Nanoparticles with Trimethyl Benzoquinone have demonstrated responsiveness to reduced environments. The experiments that have been conducted testing TMBQ are limited in observing the full scope of TMBQ nanoparticles in delivery systems.

== Development/Synthesis ==
The synthesis of reduction sensitive nanoparticles is dependent on the mechanism subtype of the nanoparticle. Additionally, the synthesis can vary within subtype classes depending on how the different reduction sensitive bonds are expressed. The deviations of RSNPs can range from attachments to the backbone, side chains, on the surface, etc. Research has been conducted with reduction sensitivity mechanisms using polymeric, lipid-polymer hybrids, and micelles nanoparticles. The production methods would be dependent on the delivery method design for the nanoparticle. Polymeric nanoparticle synthesis occurs from the addition of electrolyte-saturated or a nonelectrolyte-saturated solution with a water-miscible solvent; additionally, the mixture should be constantly stirred. Lipid micelles are formed by amphiphilic molecules through self-assembly. Lipid-polymer hybrids have multiple synthesis methods which consist of the single-step method, the two-step method, nanoprecipitation, emulsification-solvent evaporation, and a non-conventional two-step method.

== Advantages ==
Reduction Sensitive Nanoparticles provide a mode of localized drug delivery by targeting elements of the tumor microenvironment. RSNP has the advantages of high stability when adhering to hydraulic degradation, fast responsiveness to the intracellular reducing environment, and drug release occurs in the cytosol and cell nucleus. Furthermore, drug release in the cytosol and cell nucleus has shown the potential to effectively administer treatment of more potent and poorly soluble anticancer drugs. The quick-release of RSNPs has the potential to offer an effective treatment for multidrug-resistant tumors. This addresses an important limitation of nanoparticles. Nanoparticle drug delivery often exhibits slow drug release. The slow release can lead the nanomedicine to be released at low concentrations; moreover, these limited concentrations inhibit the cell death of the tumor cells. Polymeric RSNPs have shown improved solubility, stability, biocompatibility, and decreased drug toxicity; for example, carbohydrate polymers.

== Limitations ==
The effectiveness of reduction-sensitive nanoparticles is dependent on the responsiveness of the RSNP throughout the body. The microtumor and inflammatory environments contain higher concentrations of reducing agents in contrast to healthy cells; however, healthy cells still express GSH and NADPH. RSNPs are designed to be receptive to higher concentrations of reducing agents for the ability to distinguish between cancer cells and healthy cells. Furthermore, the other limitations are dependent on other characterizations, such as the type of nanoparticle; For example, micelles nanoparticles' lower levels of physical stability which can lead to drug loss and release in unwanted locations. Additionally, polymeric nanoparticles cannot effectively target the tumor and often undergo drug release too early.

== Applications ==
=== Tumor/cancer treatments ===
Reduction Sensitive Nanoparticles are used as nanomedicines for drug delivery. As nanocarriers, RSNP can be loaded with drugs for disease therapeutics. This is commonly observed in the use of tumor and cancer treatments. Cancer cells create reducing environments that are used for RSNP activation. RSNPS can also increase the penetration of cancer treatment to the cancer cells. Specific applications include, but are not limited to Breast Cancer, Liver Cancer (hepatoma), Melanoma, Lung Cancer, Malignant Glioma, Ovarian Cancer, Cervical Cancer, Subcutaneous EAT, Pancreatic Cancer, Colon Cancer, Prostate Cancer, etc.

=== Inflammatory diseases ===
The development of RSNP for inflammatory diseases has been explored to a lesser extent. Regardless, in more recent years reduction-sensitive and redox-sensitive nanoparticles have gained more momentum in the realm of inflammatory diseases. Further advances have demonstrated Research has been conducted to evaluate the potential of RSNP as a therapeutic for inflammatory bowel disease. The activation mechanism consisted of pH and redox sensitivity. The outcomes of the experiment demonstrated higher selectivity to the reducing potential; therefore establishing the promising potential of RSNPs for the treatment of inflammatory bowel disease. Other studies have demonstrated potential applications as activatable magnetic resonance contrast agents. These proposed agents would help detect and monitor the treatment of inflammatory diseases by applying redox dysregulation.

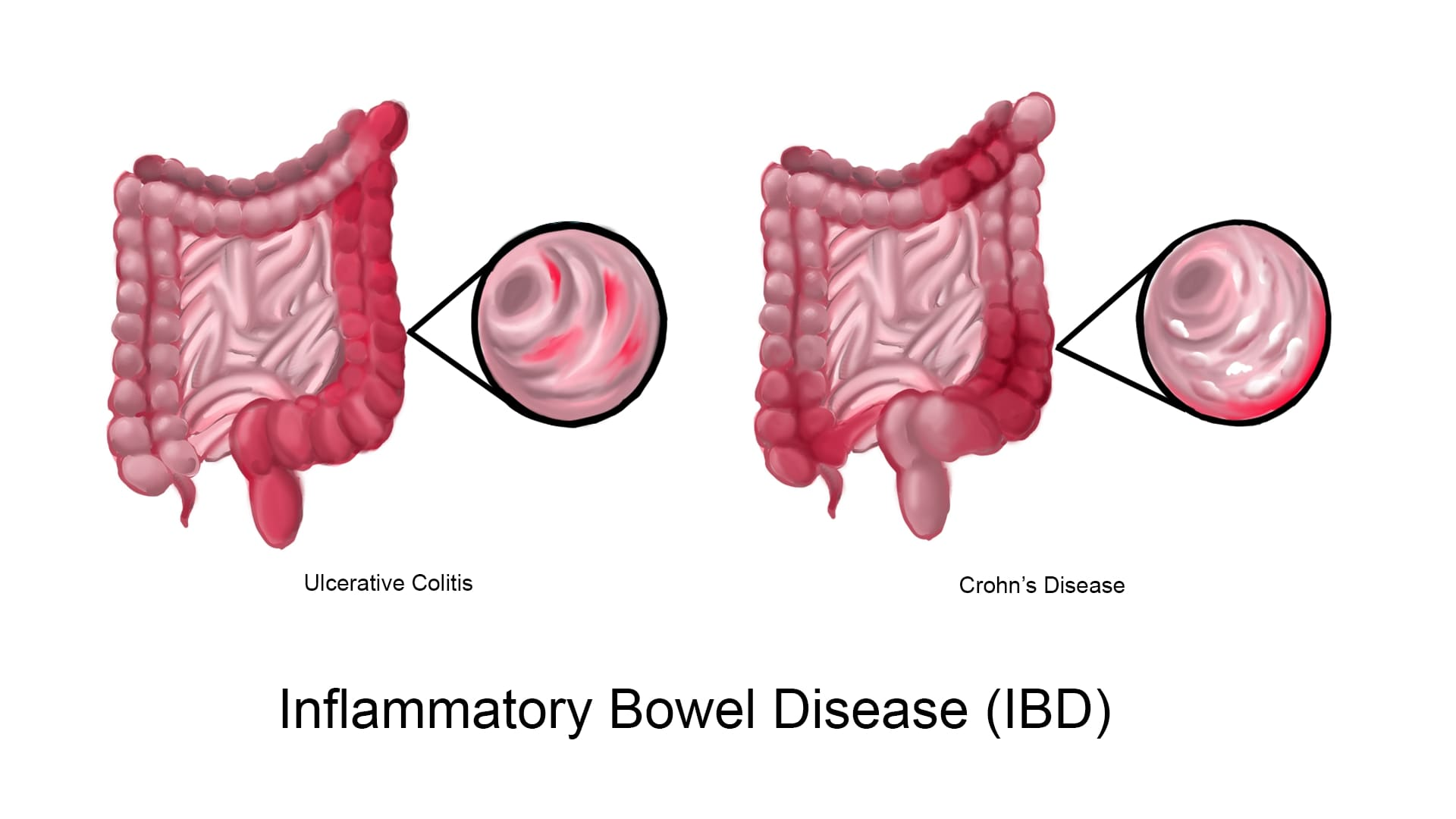
Fig. 6.0 Ulcerative Colitis VS. Crohn's Disease
