= Dimethyl selenide =

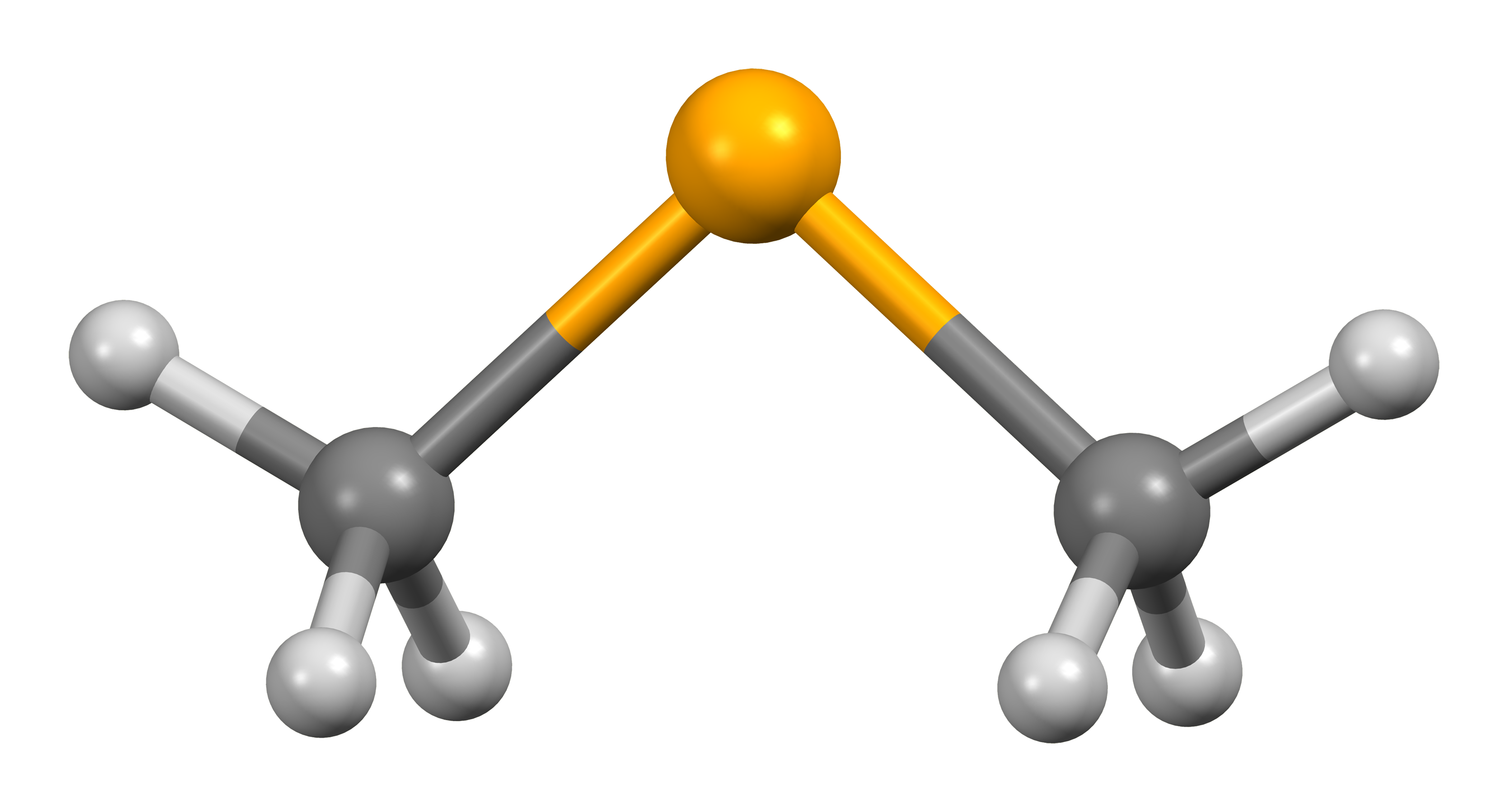

Names
- Preferred IUPAC name (Methylselanyl)methane
- Other names methylselenide

Identifiers
CAS Number	593-79-3
3D model (JSmol)	Interactive image
Beilstein Reference	1696848
ChEBI	CHEBI:4610
ChemSpider	11158
ECHA InfoCard	100.008.918
EC Number	209-807-4
KEGG	C02535
PubChem CID	11648
UNII	YK0R6JKT6H
CompTox Dashboard (EPA)	DTXSID6074752
- InChI: InChI=1S/C2H6Se/c1-3-2/h1-2H3 Key: RVIXKDRPFPUUOO-UHFFFAOYSA-N
- SMILES: C[Se]C

Properties
Chemical formula	C_{2}H_{6}Se
Molar mass	109.041 g·mol^{−1}
Appearance	colorless liquid
Density	1.4077 g/cm^{3} (14.6 °C)
Melting point	−87.2 °C (−125.0 °F; 186.0 K)
Boiling point	55 °C (131 °F; 328 K)

Hazards
- GHS labelling
Pictograms	(GHS06: Toxic) (GHS08: Health hazard) (GHS09: Environmental hazard)
Signal word	Danger
Hazard statements	H301, H331, H373, H410
Precautionary statements	P260, P264, P270, P271, P273, P301+P310, P304+P340, P311, P314, P321, P330, P391, P403+P233, P405, P501

Related compounds
Related compounds	Dimethyl ether; Dimethyl sulfide; Dimethyl telluride; Hydrogen selenide; Diethyl selenide; Dimethyl diselenide
- Except where otherwise noted, data are given for materials in their standard state (at 25 °C [77 °F], 100 kPa). Infobox references

Dimethyl selenide is the organoselenium compound with the formula (CH_{3})_{2}Se. This colorless, malodorous liquid is the simplest selenoether. It occurs in trace amounts in anaerobic environments and in the atmosphere due to biomethylation of selenium.

Dimethyl selenide is prepared by treating Se^{2−} sources with electrophilic methylating agents such as methyl iodide:

Na_{2}Se + 2 CH_{3}I → (CH_{3})_{2}Se + 2 NaI

The carbon–selenium bond length is 1.943 Å and the C–Se–C bond angle is 96.2°, as determined by rotational microwave spectroscopy. Similar dimensions of 1.98 Å and 98° are found by gas electron diffraction.
