= Methanetellurol =

Names
- IUPAC name Methanetellurol

Identifiers
CAS Number	25284-83-7
3D model (JSmol)	Interactive image
ChemSpider	14564633
PubChem CID	356643
CompTox Dashboard (EPA)	DTXSID10326743
- InChI: InChI=1S/CH4Te/c1-2/h2H,1H3 Key: JNLXBRURJAYDTD-UHFFFAOYSA-N
- SMILES: C[TeH]

Properties
Chemical formula	CH_{4}Te
Molar mass	143.64 g·mol^{−1}
Appearance	colorless gas

Related compounds
Related compounds	Methanol; Methanethiol; Methaneselenol
- Except where otherwise noted, data are given for materials in their standard state (at 25 °C [77 °F], 100 kPa). Infobox references

Methanetellurol is the organotellurium compound with the formula CH_{4}Te or CH_{3}TeH. It is the simplest organotellurium compound that has been purified in bulk. It is classified as a tellurol. A colorless gas, it decomposes to Te and methane near room temperature. It is prepared by reduction of dimethyl ditelluride using Na/NH_{3} followed by protonation of the CH_{3}Te^{−}Na^{+} (sodium methanetellurolate) with sulfuric acid. Few publications describe this compound as a consequence of its instability and paucity of applications.

According to IR spectroscopy, ν_{Te-H} = 1995 cm^{−1}. For the lighter homologues, ν_{E-H} = 2342 (E = Se), 2606 (E = S), and 3710 cm^{−1} (E = O) for methaneselenol, methanethiol, and methanol.
