= Potassium selenocyanate =

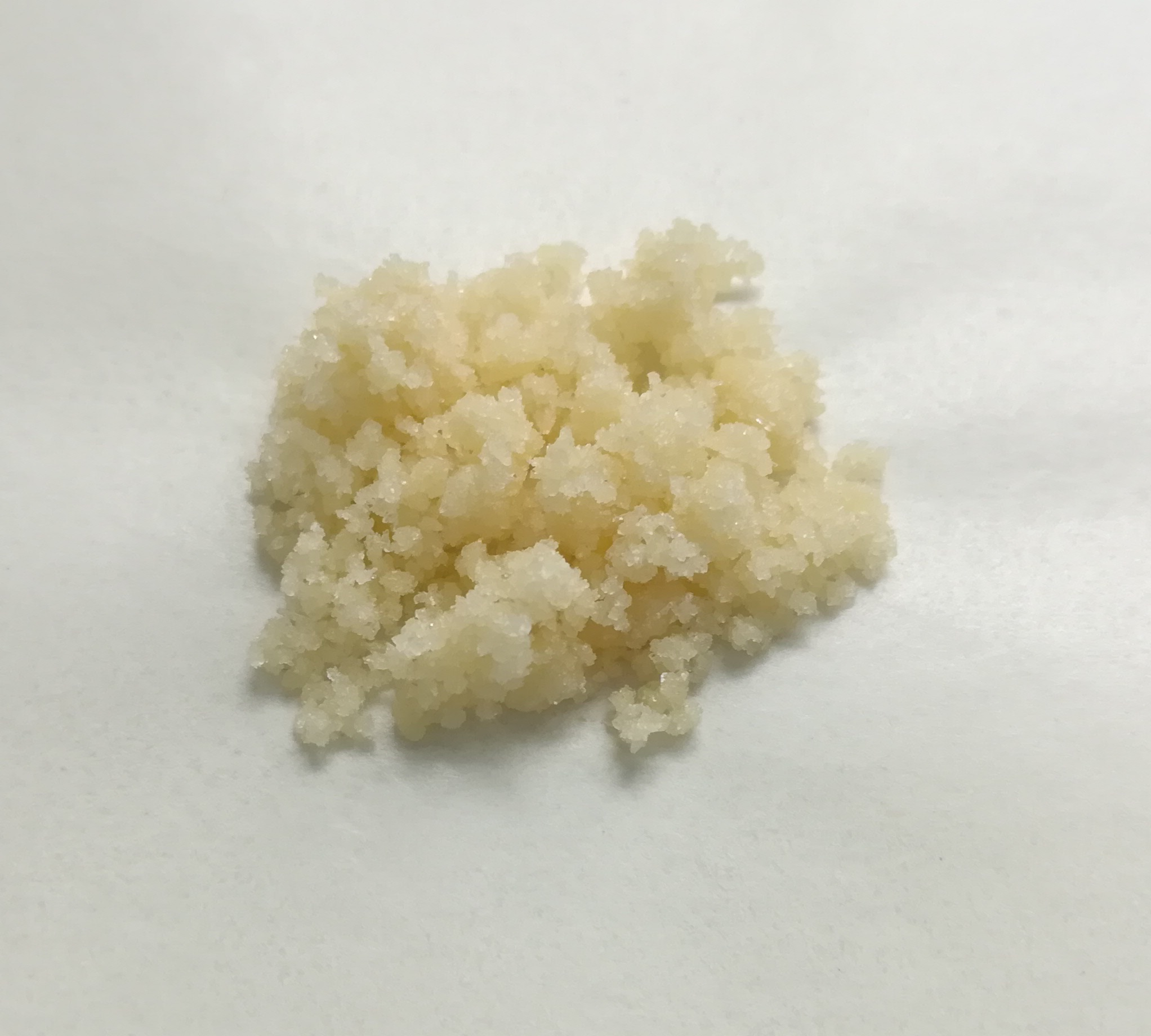

Identifiers
CAS Number	3425-46-5
3D model (JSmol)	Interactive image
ChemSpider	69409
ECHA InfoCard	100.020.292
EC Number	222-320-1
PubChem CID	76960
CompTox Dashboard (EPA)	DTXSID0063020
- InChI: InChI=1S/CHNSe.K/c2-1-3;/h3H;/q;+1/p-1 Key: KYEKHFSRAXRJBR-UHFFFAOYSA-M
- SMILES: C(#N)[Se-].[K+]

Properties
Chemical formula	CNKSe
Molar mass	144.08
Appearance	colorless or white solid
Density	2.35 g/cm^{3}
Solubility in water	high
- Except where otherwise noted, data are given for materials in their standard state (at 25 °C [77 °F], 100 kPa). Infobox references

Potassium selenocyanate is the inorganic compound with the formula KSeCN. It is a hygroscopic white solid that is soluble in water, decomposing in air to red selenium and potassium cyanide. The compound has been characterized by X-ray crystallography, which confirms that it is a salt. The C-N and C-Se distances are 112 and 183 pm, respectively consistent with triple and single bonds.

== Synthesis and reactions ==
Potassium selenocyanate is produced by the reaction of molten potassium cyanide with elemental selenium.

Organic selenocyanates are often prepared by treatment of potassium selenocyanate with alkyl halides or aryl diazonium salts.

Potassium selenocyanate serves as a source of Se^{0}, e.g., in its reaction with triphenylphosphine to give triphenylphosphine selenide.
