= Bunte salt =

Class of chemical compounds

General chemical structure of a Bunte salt

In organosulfur chemistry, a Bunte salt is an archaic name for salts with the formula R−S−SO^{−}_{3}Na^{+}. They are also called S-alkylthiosulfates or S-arylthiosulfates. These compounds named after the German chemist Hans Bunte, who first described them in 1874.

They are typically formed by alkylation on the pendant sulfur of sodium thiosulfate:

RX + Na_{2}S_{2}O_{3} → RS−SO^{−}_{3}Na^{+} + NaX

They can be easily convered into thiols, via acid catalysed hydrolysis.

RS−SO^{−}_{3}Na^{+} + H_{2}O → RSH + HSO^{−}_{4}Na^{+}

They are also used to generate unsymmetrical disulfides:

RS−SO^{−}_{3}Na^{+} + NaSR' → RS−SR' + Na_{2}SO_{3}

According to X-ray crystallography, they adopt the expected structure with tetrahedral sulfur(VI) atom, a sulfur-sulfur single bond, and three equivalent sulfur-oxygen bonds.

== See also ==
- Thiosulfonates are organosulfur compounds with the formula RSO_{2}S^{−} and RSO_{2}SR'
