= Selenenic acid =

Class of chemical compounds

General chemical structure of a selenenic acid

A selenenic acid is an organoselenium compound and an oxoacid with the general formula RSeOH, where R ≠ H. It is the first member of the family of organoselenium oxoacids, which also include seleninic acids and selenonic acids, which are RSeO_{2}H and RSeO_{3}H, respectively. Selenenic acids derived from selenoenzymes are thought to be responsible for the antioxidant activity of these enzymes. This functional group is called SeO-selenoperoxol in recent nomenclature.

== Properties ==
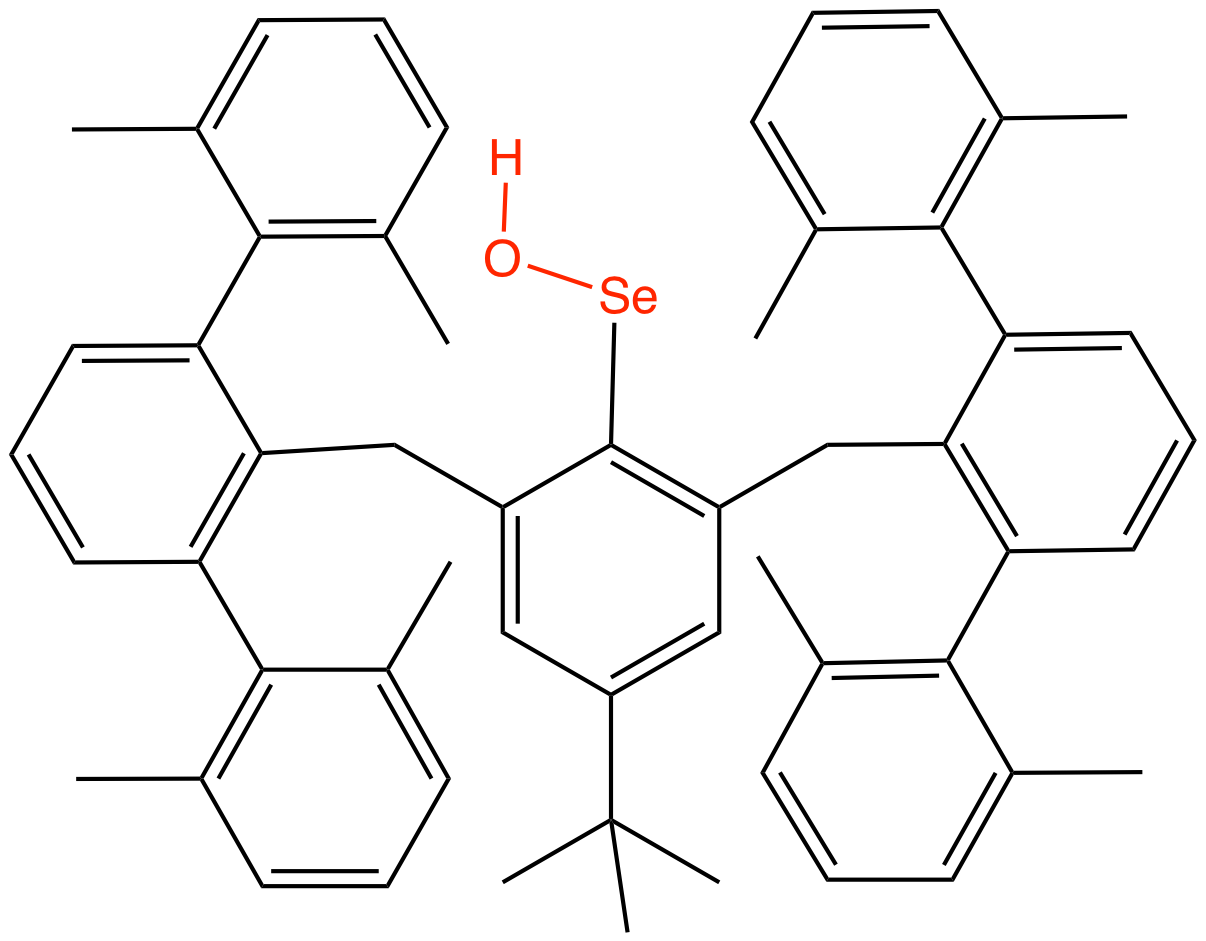
Structure of an isolable selenenic acid, 2,6-bis{[2,6-bis(2,6-dimethylphenyl)phenyl]methyl}-4-tert-butylbenzene-1-SeO-selenoperoxol (BmtSeOH).

In contrast to selenonic and seleninic acids, selenenic acids are unstable. They disproportionate to form seleninic acids and diselenides...

4 RSeOH → 2 RSeO_{2}H + RSeSeR

...or, in rare cases, self-condense to form the corresponding selenoseleninates:

4 RSeOH → 2 RSe(O)SeR + 2 H_{2}O

Even the very bulky 2,4,6-tri-tert-butylbenzeneselenenic acid disproportionates readily.

Stable selenenic acids have been synthesized by burying the SeOH functional group within the cavity of a p-tert-butyl[calix[6]arene macrocycle]. In BmtSeOH (pictured), the Se-O bond length was found to be 1.808 Å while the O-Se-C angle was 96.90°. The compound was made by oxidation of BmtSeH; further oxidation gave BmtSeO_{2}H. The Se-O absorbs in the IR spectrum at 680–700 cm^{−1}.

Selenenic acids are believed to be transient intermediates in a number of redox reactions involving organoselenium compounds. One notable example is the syn-elimination of selenoxides. Selenenic acids are also transient intermediates in the reduction of seleninic acids as well as the oxidation of diselenides. The reasoning for postulating selenenic acids as reactive intermediates is based in part on analogy with their more extensively studied sulfenic acid analogs.

== Biology ==
Selenenic acids derived from selenocysteine are involved in cell signaling and certain enzymatic processes. The best known selenoenzyme, glutathione peroxidase (GPx), catalyzes the reduction of peroxides by glutathione (GSH). The selenenic acid intermediate (E-SeOH) is formed upon oxidation of the catalytically active selenol (E-SeH) by hydrogen peroxide. This selenenic acid derivative of the peroxidase then reacts with a thiol-containing cofactor (GSH) to generate the key intermediate selenenyl sulfide (E-SeSG). This intermediate is subsequently attacked by a second GSH to regenerate the selenol and the glutathione cofactor is released in its oxidized form, GSSG. The catalytic mechanism of GPx, involves selenol (R-SeH), selenenyl sulfide (R1-SeS-R2), and selenenic acid intermediates.

RSeH + H_{2}O_{2} → RSeOH + H_{2}O
RSeOH + GSH → GS-SeR + H_{2}O
GS-SeR + GSH → GS-SG + RSeH

In the absence of thiols, selenols tend to overoxidize to produce seleninic acids. Many organoselenium compounds (selenenamides, diaryl diselenides) contain "interesting" biological activities. Their activity is attributed to their mimicry of glutathione peroxidase activity. They reduce hydroperoxides that otherwise convert to toxic byproducts and/or reactive oxygen species that can cause further damage to the cell.
