= Methaneselenol =

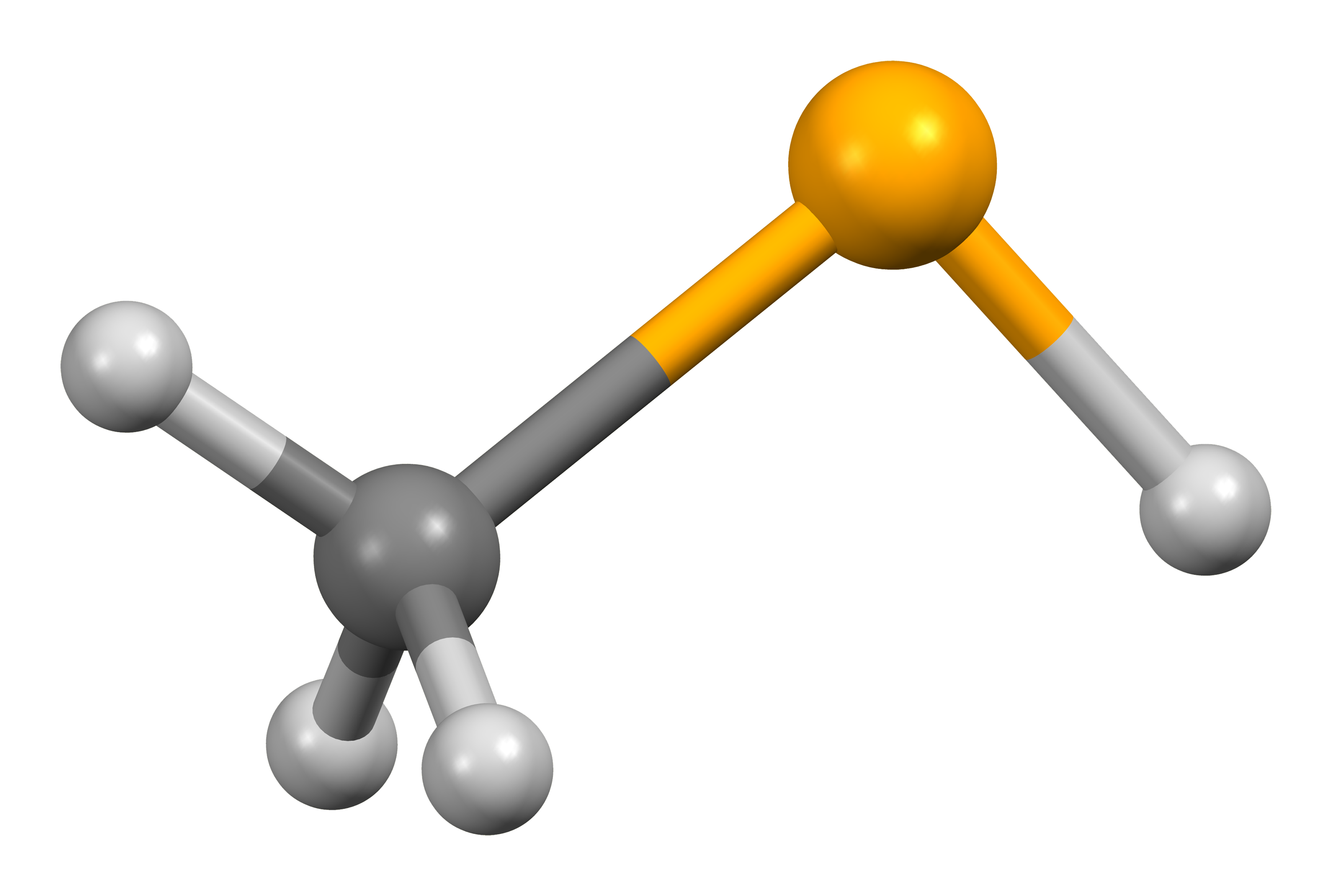

Names
- IUPAC name Methaneselenol
- Other names monomethylselenide, MMSe

Identifiers
CAS Number	6486-05-1
3D model (JSmol)	Interactive image
ChEBI	CHEBI:64685
ChemSpider	389633
KEGG	C05703
PubChem CID	440764
CompTox Dashboard (EPA)	DTXSID601344322
- InChI: Key: APKHDKJWSHYLEU-UHFFFAOYSA-N; InChI=1S/CH4Se/c1-2/h2H,1H3
- SMILES: C[SeH]

Properties
Chemical formula	CH_{4}Se
Molar mass	95.014 g·mol^{−1}
Appearance	colorless gas
Odor	akin to rotten onions, feces, or "sickly sweet rotting garbage"
Boiling point	12 °C (54 °F; 285 K)

Related compounds
Related compounds	Methanol; Methanethiol; Methanetellurol
- Except where otherwise noted, data are given for materials in their standard state (at 25 °C [77 °F], 100 kPa). Infobox references

Methaneselenol is the organoselenium compound with the formula CH_{4}Se or CH_{3}SeH. It is the simplest selenol. A colorless, poisonous gas, it is notorious for its foul, putrid odor.

It is prepared by reaction of methyl lithium or a methyl Grignard reagent with selenium followed by protonation of the product. The compound is a metabolite.

According to IR spectroscopy, ν_{Se-H} = 2342 cm^{−1}. For the other homologues, ν_{E-H} = 1995 (E = Te), 2606 (E = S), and 3710 cm^{−1} (E = O) for methanetellurol, methanethiol, and methanol.
