= Seleninic acid =

Class of chemical compounds

Chemical structure of methaneseleninic acid

A seleninic acid is an organoselenium compound and an oxoacid with the general formula RSeO_{2}H, where R ≠ H. Its structure is R−Se(=O)−OH. It is a member of the family of organoselenium oxoacids, which also includes selenenic acids and selenonic acids, which are R−Se−OH and R−Se(=O)_{2}−OH, respectively. The parent member of this family of compounds is methaneseleninic acid (CH_{3}−Se(=O)−OH), also known as methylseleninic acid or "MSA".

== Reactions and applications in synthesis ==
Despite the term "acid", seleninic acids are in fact amphoteric, forming stable hydrochloride and hydroselenonate salts.

Seleninic acids (particularly areneseleninic acids) are useful catalysts for hydrogen peroxide epoxidations, Baeyer–Villiger oxidations, oxidations of thioethers, etc.; peroxyseleninic acids (R−Se(=O)−OOH) are thought to be the active oxidants.

Hydrazine reduces seleninic acids to the diselenide. Depending on stoichiometry, thiols reduce seleninic acids to selenenic anhydrides or selenides.

== Structure, properties ==
Methaneseleninic acid has been characterized by X-ray crystallography. The configuration about the selenium atom is pyramidal, with Se-C = 1.925(8) Å, Se-O = 1.672(7) Å, Se-OH = 1.756(7) Å, the angle OSeO = 103.0(3)°, the angle HO-Se-C = 93.5(3)°, and the angle OSeC = 101.4(3)°. The structure is isomorphous to that of methanesulfonic acid

Benzeneseleninic acid (C_{6}H_{5}−Se(=O)−OH) had been previously characterized by X-ray methods and its optical resolution reported.
