= Selenourea =

- Structural formula

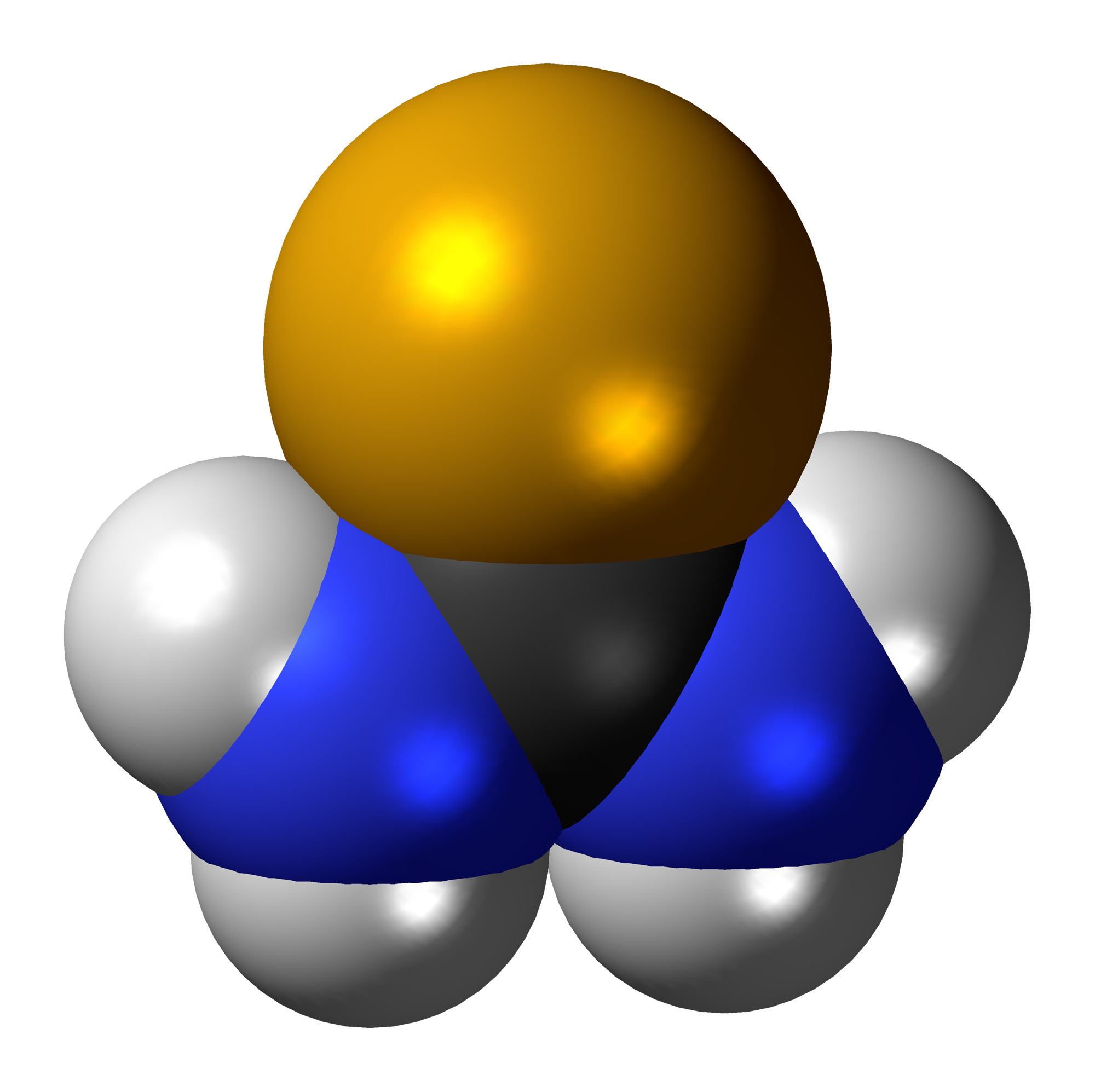
- Space-filling model Carbon, C Hydrogen, H Nitrogen, N Selenium

Identifiers
CAS Number	630-10-4
3D model (JSmol)	Interactive image
Beilstein Reference	1734744
ChEBI	CHEBI:36957
ChEMBL	ChEMBL3187603
ChemSpider	10293781
ECHA InfoCard	100.010.119
EC Number	211-129-9
Gmelin Reference	239756
MeSH	C081959
PubChem CID	6327594
RTECS number	YU1820000
UNII	0W506YR523
UN number	3283 3077
CompTox Dashboard (EPA)	DTXSID4024303
- InChI: InChI=1S/CH4N2Se/c2-1(3)4/h(H4,2,3,4) Key: IYKVLICPFCEZOF-UHFFFAOYSA-N; InChI=1/CH4N2Se/c2-1(3)4/h(H4,2,3,4) Key: IYKVLICPFCEZOF-UHFFFAOYAJ
- SMILES: NC(N)=[Se]

Properties
Chemical formula	SeC(NH_{2})_{2}
Molar mass	123.028 g·mol^{−1}
Appearance	White solid; pink/grey solid when impure
Melting point	200 °C (392 °F; 473 K)
Boiling point	214 °C (417 °F; 487 K)

Hazards
- GHS labelling
Pictograms	(GHS06: Toxic) (GHS08: Health hazard) (GHS09: Environmental hazard)
Signal word	Danger
Hazard statements	H301, H331, H373, H410
Precautionary statements	P260, P264, P270, P271, P273, P301+P310, P304+P340, P311, P314, P321, P330, P391, P403+P233, P405, P501

Related compounds
Related compounds	Urea; Thiourea
- Except where otherwise noted, data are given for materials in their standard state (at 25 °C [77 °F], 100 kPa). verify (what is ?) Infobox references

Selenourea is the organoselenium compound with the chemical formula Se=C(NH_{2})_{2}. It is a white solid. This compound features a rare example of a stable, unhindered carbon-selenium double bond. The compound is used in the synthesis of selenium heterocycles. Selenourea is a selenium analog of urea O=C(NH_{2})_{2}. Few studies have been done on the compound due to the instability and toxicity of selenium compounds. Selenourea is toxic if inhaled or consumed.

== Synthesis ==
The compound was first synthesized in 1884 by Auguste Verneuil by the reaction of hydrogen selenide and cyanamide:

H_{2}Se + N≡C−NH_{2} → Se=C(NH_{2})_{2}

While this reaction has even found use in industrial synthesis of selenourea, more modern methods concern themselves with synthesis of substituted selenoureas. These can be synthesized using organic isoselenocyanates and secondary amines:

R−N=C=Se + NHR′R″ → Se=C(−NHR)(−NR′R″)

Alternatively, isocyanides react with amines in the presence of elemental selenium:

RN≡C + R'_{2}NH + Se → R(H)NC(Se)NR'_{2}

== Properties ==
X-ray crystallographic measurements on crystals at −100 °C give average C=Se bond lengths of 1.86 Å, and 1.37 Å for C−N. Both the Se−C−N and N−C−N angles were measured at 120°, as expected for an sp^{2}-hybridized carbon. Through these same studies, the existence of Se−H hydrogen bonding in the crystal lattice—suggested from the O−H and S−H hydrogen bonding found in crystals of urea and thiourea—was confirmed.

Both the shortened length of the N−C bond and the longer Se=C bond suggest a delocalization of the lone pair on the amines; the Se=C π-bonding electrons are drawn towards the selenium atom, while the nitrogen's lone pair is drawn towards the carbonyl carbon. A similar effect is observed in urea and thiourea. In going from urea to thiourea to selenourea the double bond is more delocalized and longer, while the C−N σ bond is stronger and shorter. In terms of resonance structures, the selenol form (structures II, III) is more prevalent compared to urea and thiourea analogs; however, the lone pair the nitrogen of selenourea delocalizes only slightly more than the lone pair on thiourea (in contrast to a much greater delocalization in going from urea to thiourea). These minor differences suggest that the properties emergent from the delocalized nitrogen lone pair and destabilization of the C=S and C=Se π bond in thiourea and selenourea will also be similar.

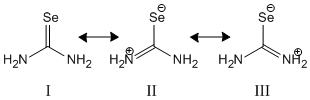

Unlike urea and thiourea, which have both been researched extensively, relatively few studies quantitatively characterize selenourea. While the selone tautomer (I) has been shown to be the more stable form, mainly qualitative and comparative information on selenourea's tautomerization is available.

In comparable manner to ketones, selones also tautomerize:

Since the greater delocalization of the lone pair electrons correlates with the selone product, the equilibrium position of selenourea likely has an equilibrium position comparable to thiourea's (which is lies more to the right that than urea's). Thiourea has been shown to exist predominantly in its thione form at 42 °C in dilute methanol, with the thionol tautomer almost nonexistent at neutral pH.

== Reactivity ==
An important class of reactions of selenourea is the formation of heterocycles. Some selenium-containing heterocycles exhibit antiinflammatory and antitumor activity, among other medicinal uses. Using selenourea as a precursor is considered to be the most efficient means of selenium-containing heterocyclic synthesis.

Another class of reactions is the complexation of selenourea with transition metals and metalloids. Its ability to act as an effective ligand is attributed to the electron-donating effect of the amino groups and consequent stabilization of the selenium–metal π bond. In selenourea complexes only selenium–metal bonding has been observed, unlike in the urea and thiourea counterparts, which also bond through the nitrogen atom.
