= S-Methyl methanethiosulfonate =

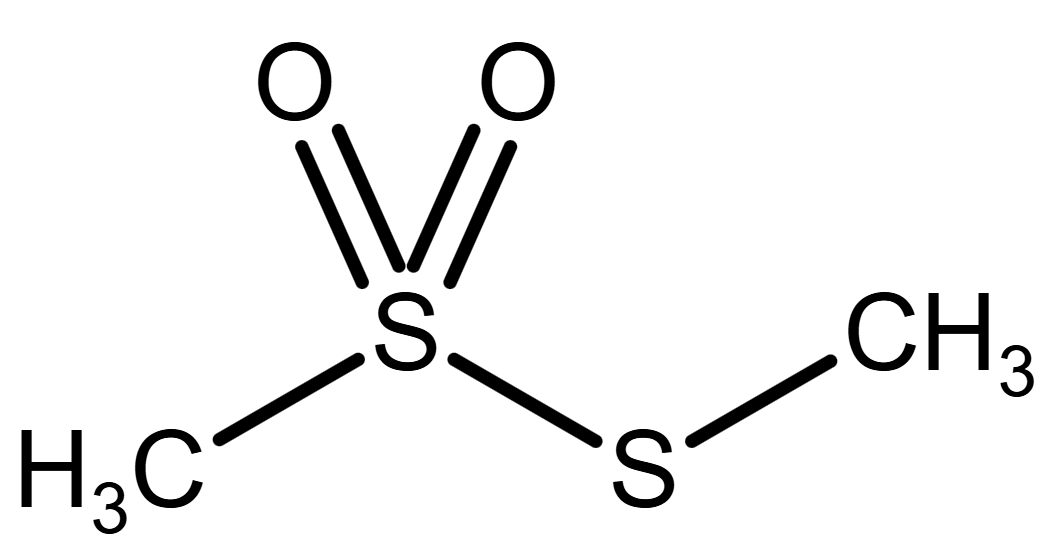

Names
- IUPAC name Methylsulfonylsulfanylmethane
- Preferred IUPAC name S-Methyl methanesulfonothioate
- Other names: S-Methyl methanethiosulfonate; Methanesulfonothioic acid, S-methyl ester; MMTS

Identifiers
CAS Number	2949-92-0
3D model (JSmol)	Interactive image
ChEBI	CHEBI:74357
ChEMBL	ChEMBL1236925
ChemSpider	17065
ECHA InfoCard	100.019.064
EC Number	220-970-0
PubChem CID	18064
UNII	0906Z2356U
CompTox Dashboard (EPA)	DTXSID8062739
- InChI: InChI=1S/C2H6O2S2/c1-5-6(2,3)4/h1-2H3 Key: XYONNSVDNIRXKZ-UHFFFAOYSA-N
- SMILES: CSS(=O)(=O)C

Properties
Chemical formula	CH_{3}SO_{2}SCH_{3}
Molar mass	126.19 g·mol^{−1}
Appearance	Colorless liquid
Odor	Stench
Density	1.337 g/cm^{3}
Boiling point	266 to 267 °C (511 to 513 °F; 539 to 540 K) (69 to 71 °C at 0.5 hPa)
Solubility in water	slightly
Solubility	ethanol
Vapor pressure	1.87 Pa
Refractive index (n_{D})	1.513 at 20 °C

Hazards
- Occupational safety and health (OHS/OSH)
Main hazards	Serious eye damage
- GHS labelling
Pictograms	(GHS06: Toxic) (GHS07: Exclamation mark)
Signal word	Danger
Hazard statements	H301, H315, H317, H319, H335
Precautionary statements	P261, P264, P265, P271, P272, P280, P301+P310, P302+P352, P304+P340, P305+P351+P338, P319, P321, P332+P317, P337+P317, P362+P364, P403+P233, P405, P501
Flash point	87 °C
- Lethal dose or concentration (LD, LC)
LD_{50} (median dose)	9.11 mg/kg (mouse, intraperitoneal)

Related compounds
Related compounds	Methyl methanesulfonate
- Except where otherwise noted, data are given for materials in their standard state (at 25 °C [77 °F], 100 kPa). Infobox references

S-Methyl methanethiosulfonate, also known as MMTS, is an organosulfur compound with the chemical formula CH_{3}−SO_{2}−S−CH_{3}. It is the S-methyl ester of methanethiosulfonic acid. It is a colorless liquid. It is obtained by condensation of methanesulfonic acid with methanethiol.

CH_{3}SO_{2}OH + CH_{3}SH → CH_{3}SO_{2}SCH_{3} + H_{2}O

== Biological role ==
It has a role as a human metabolite. It is found in cytoplasm and extracellular fluid. It has been reported in Brassica oleracea (wild cabbage), Brassica family, Euglena gracilis, Trypanosoma brucei and Allium cepa (onion family).

== Uses ==
S-Methyl methanethiosulfonate is used as a flavoring agent. It has a sulfurous, roasted and pungent odor and taste.

S-Methyl methanethiosulfonate is a compound with a small molecule that reversibly blocks cysteine and other molecules containing sulfhydryl groups, enabling the study of enzyme activation and other protein functions.

== Safety ==
S-Methyl methanethiosulfonate causes skin irritation and corrosion. May cause serious eye irritation and serious eye damage. This compound is also a respiratory tract irritant.
