= Glutathione oxidase =

Identifiers
- EC no.: 1.8.3.3
- CAS no.: 55467-56-6

Databases
- BRENDA: enzyme data
- ExPASy: NiceZyme view
- KEGG: enzyme entry
- MetaCyc: metabolic pathway
- Rhea: reactions
- PDB structures: RCSB PDB PDBe PDBsum
- Gene Ontology: AmiGO / QuickGO
Search
- PMC: articles
- PubMed: articles
- NCBI: proteins

Glutathione oxidase (EC 1.8.3.3) is an enzyme that catalyzes the chemical reaction

2
glutathione
O_{2}
H_{2}O_{2}
O_{2}
H_{2}O_{2}
glutathione disulfide

The two substrates of this enzyme are glutathione and oxygen. Its products are glutathione disulfide and hydrogen peroxide.

This enzyme belongs to the family of oxidoreductases, specifically those acting on a sulfur group of donors with oxygen as acceptor. The systematic name of this enzyme class is glutathione:oxygen oxidoreductase. This enzyme participates in glutathione metabolism. It employs one cofactor, flavin adenine dinucleotide.
