= Selenonic acid =

Class of chemical compounds

General chemical structure of a selenonic acid

A selenonic acid is an organoselenium compound containing the −SeO_{3}H functional group. The formula of selenonic acids is R−Se(=O)_{2}−OH, where R is organyl group. Selenonic acids are the selenium analogs of sulfonic acids. Examples of the acid are rare. Benzeneselenonic acid PhSeO_{3}H (where Ph stands for phenyl) is a white solid. It can be prepared by the oxidation of benzeneselenol.

== See also ==
- Selenenic acid
- Seleninic acid
