= Diethyl selenide =

Organoselenium compound

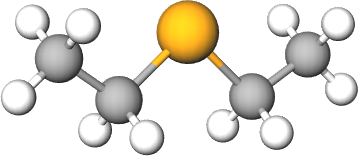

Names
- Preferred IUPAC name (Ethylselanyl)ethane
- Other names Ethyl selenide

Identifiers
CAS Number	627-53-2
3D model (JSmol)	Interactive image
ChemSpider	55119
PubChem CID	61173
UN number	2630
CompTox Dashboard (EPA)	DTXSID30211768
- InChI: InChI=1S/C4H10Se/c1-3-5-4-2/h3-4H2,1-2H3 Key: ALCDAWARCQFJBA-UHFFFAOYSA-N
- SMILES: CC[Se]CC

Properties
Chemical formula	C_{4}H_{10}Se
Molar mass	137.09 g/mol
Appearance	colorless liquid
Density	1.232 g/ml
Melting point	−87 °C (−125 °F; 186 K)
Boiling point	108 °C (226 °F; 381 K)

Hazards
- Occupational safety and health (OHS/OSH)
Main hazards	Flammability, toxicity
- GHS labelling
Pictograms	(GHS02: Flammable) (GHS06: Toxic) (GHS05: Corrosive) (GHS09: Environmental hazard) (GHS08: Health hazard)
Signal word	Danger
Hazard statements	H225, H301, H331, H373, H410
Precautionary statements	P210, P233, P240, P241, P242, P243, P260, P264, P270, P271, P273, P280, P301+P310, P303+P361+P353, P304+P340, P311, P314, P321, P330, P370+P378, P391, P403+P233, P403+P235, P405, P501
NFPA 704 (fire diamond)	3 3 1
Flash point	22 °C (72 °F; 295 K)
Autoignition temperature	Not available
- Except where otherwise noted, data are given for materials in their standard state (at 25 °C [77 °F], 100 kPa). Infobox references

Diethyl selenide is an organoselenium compound with the formula C_{4}H_{10}Se. First reported in 1836, it was the first organoselenium compound to be discovered. It is the selenium analogue of diethyl ether. It has a strong and unpleasant smell.

== Occurrence ==
Diethyl selenide has been detected in biofuel produced from plantain peel. It is also a minor air pollutant in some areas.

== Preparation ==
It may be prepared by a substitution reaction similar to the Williamson ether synthesis: reaction of a metal selenide, such as sodium selenide, with two equivalents of ethyl iodide or similar reagent to supply the ethyl groups:
