= Diselenide =

Diselenide may refer to:

- Diselane, H-Se-Se-H
- Carbon diselenide, CSe_{2}, a yellow-orange oily liquid with pungent odor
- Any organic chemical compound with a selenium-selenium bond, R-Se-Se-R (see Organoselenium chemistry)
  - Diphenyl diselenide, (C_{6}H_{5})–Se–Se–(C_{6}H_{5})
  - selenocystine
- Metal dichalcogenides
  - Manganese diselenide (MnSe_{2})
  - Molybdenum diselenide (MoSe_{2})
  - Tungsten diselenide (WSe_{2})
  - Titanium diselenide (TiSe_{2})
