= Organoselenium chemistry =

Study of chemical compounds containing carbon-selenium bonds

Organoselenium chemistry is the science exploring the properties and reactivity of organoselenium compounds, chemical compounds containing carbon-to-selenium chemical bonds. Selenium belongs with oxygen and sulfur to the group 16 elements or chalcogens, and similarities in chemistry are to be expected. Organoselenium compounds are found at trace levels in ambient waters, soils and sediments.

Selenium can exist with oxidation state −2, +2, +4, +6. Se(II) is the dominant form in organoselenium chemistry. Down the group 16 column, the bond strength becomes increasingly weaker (234 kJ/mol for the C−Se bond and 272 kJ/mol for the C−S bond) and the bond lengths longer (C−Se 198 pm, C−S 181 pm and C−O 141 pm). Consistent with the inertness of large-n s orbitals, dicoordinate selenium compounds have a bond angle of nearly 90°. Selenium compounds are more nucleophilic than the corresponding sulfur compounds and also more acidic. The pK_{a} values of XH_{2} are 16 for oxygen, 7 for sulfur and 3.8 for selenium. In contrast to sulfoxides, the corresponding selenoxides are unstable in the presence of β-protons and this property is utilized in many organic reactions of selenium, notably in selenoxide oxidations and in selenoxide eliminations.

The first organoselenium compound to be isolated was diethyl selenide in 1836.

== Structural classification ==
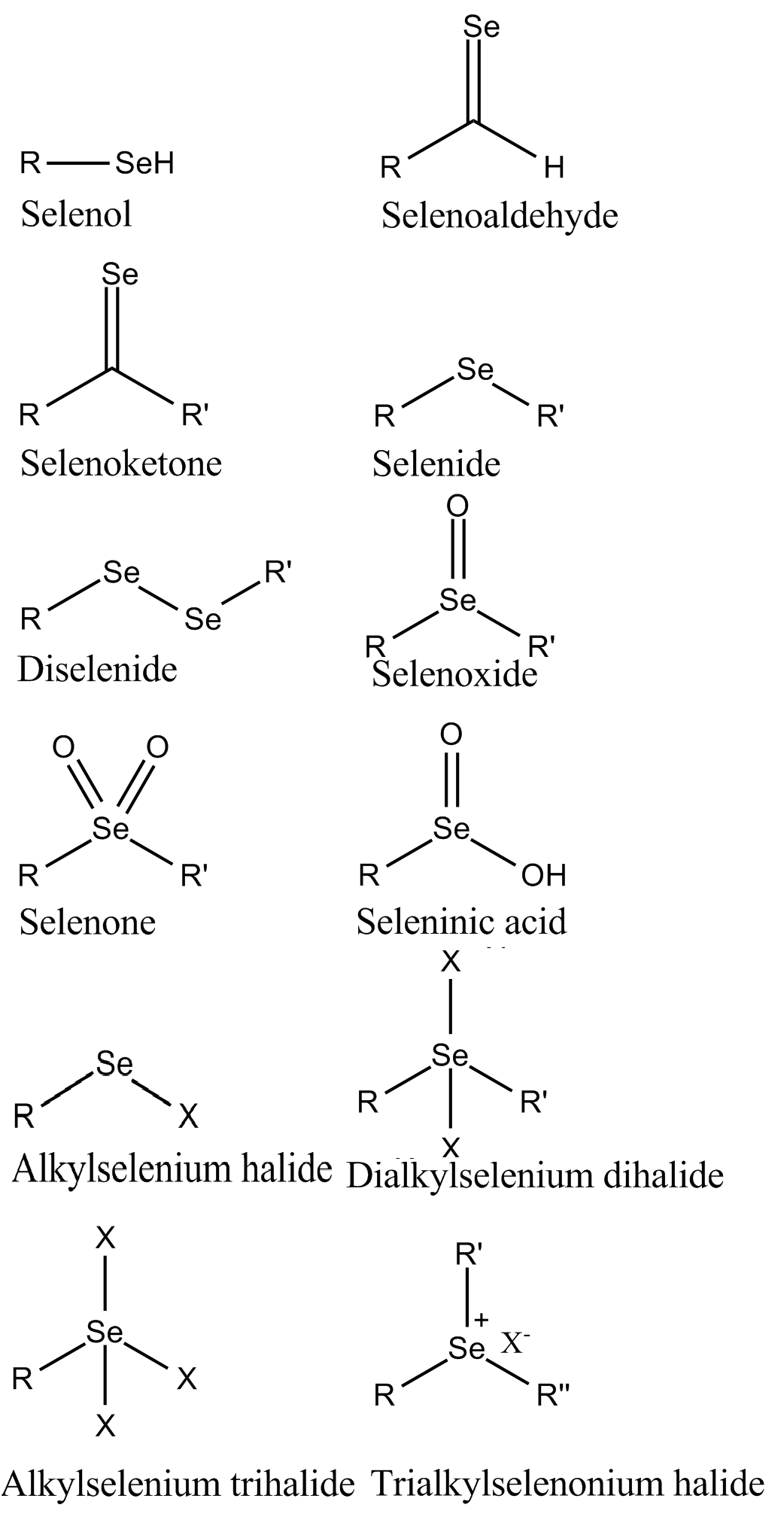
Structures of some organoselenium compounds

- Selenols (R−SeH) are the selenium equivalents of alcohols and thiols. relatively unstable and generally have an unpleasant smell. Benzeneselenol (also called selenophenol or PhSeH) is more acidic (pK_{a} 5.9) than thiophenol (pK_{a} 6.5) and also oxidizes more readily to the diselenide. Indeed, selenophenol is prepared by reduction of diphenyldiselenide as the former is not air-stable.
- Diselenides (R−Se−Se−R) are the selenium equivalents of peroxides and disulfides. They are useful shelf-stable precursors to more reactive organoselenium reagents such as selenols and selanyl halides. Diselenides are typically prepared from the autoxidation of selenolates or alkylation of the diselenide anion, but secondary diselenides can be produced from the hydrogen selenide reduction of ketones. Best known in organic chemistry is diphenyldiselenide, prepared from phenylmagnesium bromide and selenium followed by aerobic oxidation of the product PhSeMgBr. Heating decomposes them to selenoethers or (in rare cases) the coupled alkane.
- Selanyl halides (R−Se−Cl, R−Se−Br) are prepared by halogenation of diselenides. For example, bromination of diphenyldiselenide gives phenylselanyl bromide (PhSeBr). These compounds are Lewis acidic, often stabilized by intramolecular coordination; and sources of "PhSe^{+}". Excess halogen gives the corresponding trihalides.
- Selenides (R−Se−R), also called selenoethers, are the selenium equivalents of ethers and sulfides. One example is dimethylselenide ((CH_{3})_{2}Se). These are the most prevalent organoselenium compounds. Symmetrical selenides are usually prepared by alkylation of alkali metal selenide salts, e.g. sodium selenide. Unsymmetrical selenides are prepared by alkylation of selenoates. These compounds typically react as nucleophiles, e.g. with alkyl halides (R'−X) to give selenonium salts [RR'R"Se]^{+}X^{−}. Divalent selenium can also interact with soft heteroatoms to form hypervalent selenium centers. They also react in some circumstances as electrophiles, e.g. with organolithium reagents (R'Li) to the ate complex R'RRSe^{−}Li^{+}.
- Selenoxides (R−Se(=O)−R) are the selenium equivalents of sulfoxides. Most are unstable, undergoing the selenoxide elimination, but can be notionally oxidized to selenones R−Se(=O)_{2}−R, the selenium analogues of sulfones.
- Selenenic acid (R−Se−OH) are intermediates in the oxidation of selenols. They occur in some selenoenzymes, such as glutathione peroxidase.
- Seleninic acids (R−Se(=O)−OH) are analogues of sulfinic acids.
- Selenonic acids (R−Se(=O)_{2}−OH) are analogues of sulfonic acids.
- Peroxyseleninic acids (R−Se(=O)−OOH) catalyse epoxidation reactions and Baeyer–Villiger oxidations.
- Selenuranes are hypervalent organoselenium compounds, formally derived from the tetrahalides such as SeCl_{4}. Examples are of the type Ar−SeCl_{3}. The chlorides are obtained by chlorination of the selenenyl chloride.
- Seleniranes are three-membered rings (the parent compound is selenirane or selenacyclobutane C_{2}H_{4}Se) related to thiiranes but, unlike thiiranes, seleniranes are kinetically unstable, extruding selenium directly (without oxidation) to form alkenes. This property has been utilized in synthetic organic chemistry.
- Selones (R_{2}C=Se) are the selenium analogues of ketones. They are rare due to their tendency to oligomerize. Diselenobenzoquinone is stable as a metal complex. Selenourea is an example of a stable compound containing a (formal) C=Se bond.
- Thioselenides (R−Se−S−R), compounds with bonds between divalent selenium and divalent sulfur, analogous to disulfides. Likewise a selenamide has form R–Se–NR_{2}. The latter are generally stable if and only if at least one of the nitrogen or the selenium is attached to an electron-withdrawing group.

Per Paulmier, "hexacoordinated selenium does not appear in organic chemistry."

== In nature ==
Selenium, in the form of organoselenium compounds, is an essential micronutrient whose absence from the diet causes cardiac muscle and skeletal dysfunction. Organoselenium compounds are required for cellular defense against oxidative damage and for the correct functioning of the immune system. They may also play a role in prevention of premature aging and cancer. The source of Se used in biosynthesis is selenophosphate.

Glutathione oxidase is an enzyme with a selenol at its active site.

Organoselenium compounds have been found in higher plants. For example, upon analysis of garlic using the technique of high-performance liquid chromatography combined with inductively coupled plasma mass spectrometry (HPLC-ICP-MS), it was found that γ-glutamyl-Se-methylselenocysteine was the major Se-containing component, along with lesser amounts of Se-methylselenocysteine. Trace quantities of dimethyl selenide and allyl methyl selenide are found in human breath after consuming raw garlic.

Indeed, organoselenium compounds have a terrible smell.

=== Selenocysteine and selenomethionine ===
Selenocysteine, called the twenty-first amino acid, is essential for ribosome-directed protein synthesis in some organisms. More than 25 selenium-containing proteins (selenoproteins) are now known. Most selenium-dependent enzymes contain selenocysteine, which is related to cysteine analog but with selenium replacing sulfur. This amino acid is encoded in a special manner by DNA. Selenosulfides are also proposed as biochemical intermediates.

Selenomethionine is a selenide-containing amino acid that also occurs naturally, but is generated by post-transcriptional modification.

== In organic synthesis ==
Organoselenium compounds are specialized but useful collection of reagents in organic synthesis, hinging on certain attributes, including

- the weakness of the C−Se bond and
- the easy oxidation of divalent selenium compounds.

Per Paulmier, elemental selenium and diphenyl diselenide are sufficient selenium sources to produce most selenium intermediates at laboratory scale.

Regulations generally exclude their use in pharmaceutical manufacture.

Contrary to theoretical productions, selenium stablizes geminal carbanions slightly less than the corresponding sulfur compounds. Moreover, selenium is so nucleophilic that alkyl halides preferentially alkylate the selenium in many selenoether anions, before the halide collapses the resulting ylide in a nucleophilic substitution. Nevertheless, propargylic selenoether anions alkylate without deselenation, and then oxidize to α-selenoenones.

Heated 1‑selena-2,3‑diazoles decompose to the corresponding alkyne.

=== Vinylic selenides ===
Vinylic selenides are organoselenium compounds that play a role in organic synthesis, especially in the development of convenient stereoselective routes to functionalized alkenes. Although various methods are mentioned for the preparation of vinylic selenides, a more useful procedure has centered on the nucleophilic or electrophilic organoselenium addition to terminal or internal alkynes. For example, the nucleophilic addition of selenophenol to alkynes affords, preferentially, the Z-vinylic selenides after longer reaction times at room temperature. The reaction is faster at a high temperature; however, the mixture of Z- and E-vinylic selenides was obtained in an almost 1:1 ratio. On the other hand, the adducts depend on the nature of the substituents at the triple bond. Conversely, vinylic selenides can be prepared by palladium-catalyzed hydroselenation of alkynes to afford the Markovnikov adduct in good yields. There are some limitations associated with the methodologies to prepare vinylic selenides illustrated above; the procedures described employ diorganoyl diselenides or selenophenol as starting materials, which are volatile and unstable and have an unpleasant odor. Also, the preparation of these compounds is complex.

=== Selenoxide oxidations ===
Selenium dioxide is useful in organic oxidation. Specifically, SeO_{2} will convert an allylic methylene group into the corresponding alcohol. A number of other reagents bring about this reaction.

Scheme 1. Selenium dioxide oxidation

In terms of reaction mechanism, SeO_{2} and the allylic substrate react via pericyclic process beginning with an ene reaction that activates the C−H bond. The second step is a [2,3] sigmatropic reaction. Oxidations involving selenium dioxide are often carried out with catalytic amounts of the selenium compound and in presence of a sacrificial catalyst or co-oxidant such as hydrogen peroxide.

SeO_{2}-based oxidations sometimes afford carbonyl compounds such as ketones, β-Pinene and cyclohexanone oxidation to 1,2-cyclohexanedione. Oxidation of ketones having α-methylene groups affords diketones. This type of oxidation with selenium oxide is called Riley oxidation.

Aza analogues attach an amide, rather than alcohol, at the corresponding position (Ts=Tosyl):

Se(NTs)_{2} + RCH=CHCH_{3} → Se + RCH=CHCH_{2}NTs

=== Selenoxide eliminations ===
In presence of a β-hydrogen, a selenide will give an elimination reaction after oxidation, to leave behind an alkene and a SeO-selenoperoxol. The SeO-selenoperoxol is highly reactive and is not isolated as such. In the elimination reaction, all five participating reaction centers are coplanar and, therefore, the reaction stereochemistry is syn. Oxidizing agents used are hydrogen peroxide, ozone or MCPBA. This reaction type is often used with ketones leading to enones. An example is acetylcyclohexanone elimination with benzeneselenylchloride and sodium hydride.

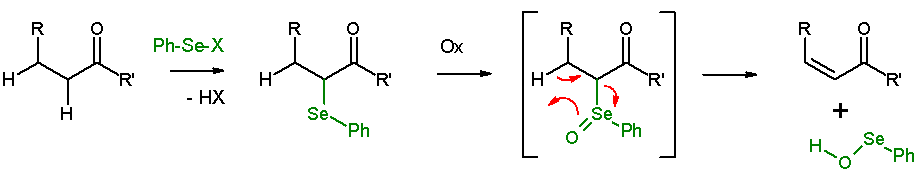
Scheme 2. Selenoxide elimination of carbonyl compounds

The Grieco elimination is a similar selenoxide elimination using o-nitrophenylselenocyanate and tributylphosphine to cause the elimination of the elements of H_{2}O.
