= Tellurium tetrafluoride =

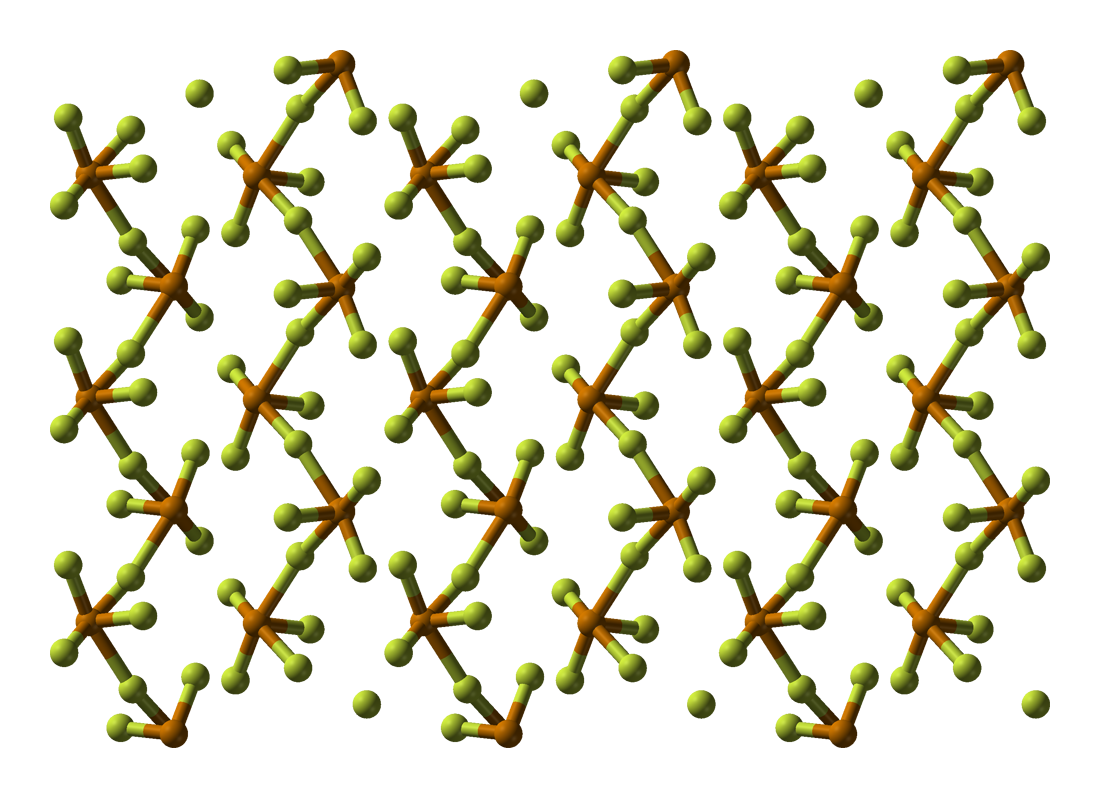

Names
- IUPAC name tellurium(IV) fluoride

Identifiers
CAS Number	15192-26-4
3D model (JSmol)	Interactive image
ChEBI	CHEBI:30468
ChemSpider	146333
Gmelin Reference	25977
PubChem CID	167258
CompTox Dashboard (EPA)	DTXSID80934374
- InChI: InChI=1S/F4Te/c1-5(2,3)4 Key: CRMPMTUAAUPLIK-UHFFFAOYSA-N
- SMILES: F[Te](F)(F)F

Properties
Chemical formula	TeF_{4}
Molar mass	203.594
Appearance	white crystalline solid
Melting point	129 °C (264 °F; 402 K)

Related compounds
Other anions	Tellurium dioxide; Tellurium tetrachloride; Tellurium(IV) bromide; Tellurium(IV) iodide
Other cations	Sulfur tetrafluoride; Selenium tetrafluoride
Related compounds	Tellurium hexafluoride
- Except where otherwise noted, data are given for materials in their standard state (at 25 °C [77 °F], 100 kPa). verify (what is ?) Infobox references

Tellurium tetrafluoride, TeF_{4}, is a stable, white, hygroscopic crystalline solid and is one of two fluorides of tellurium. The other binary fluoride is tellurium hexafluoride. The widely reported Te_{2}F_{10} has been shown to be F_{5}TeOTeF_{5} (teflic anhydride). There are other tellurium compounds that contain fluorine, but only the two mentioned contain solely tellurium and fluorine. Tellurium difluoride, TeF_{2}, and ditellurium difluoride, Te_{2}F_{2} are not known.

== Preparation ==
Tellurium tetrafluoride can be prepared reacting tellurium dioxide with sulfur tetrafluoride:

TeO_{2} + 2SF_{4} → TeF_{4} + 2SOF_{2}

It is also prepared by reacting nitryl fluoride with tellurium or from the elements at 0 °C or by reacting selenium tetrafluoride with tellurium dioxide at 80 °C.
Fluorine in nitrogen can react with TeCl_{2} or TeBr_{2} to form TeF_{4}. PbF_{2} will also fluorinate tellurium to TeF_{4}.

== Reactivity ==
Tellurium tetrafluoride will react with water or silica and forms tellurium oxides. Copper, silver, gold or nickel will react with tellurium tetrafluoride at 185 °C. It does not react with platinum. It is soluble in SbF_{5} and will precipitate out the complex TeF_{4}SbF_{5}.

== Properties ==
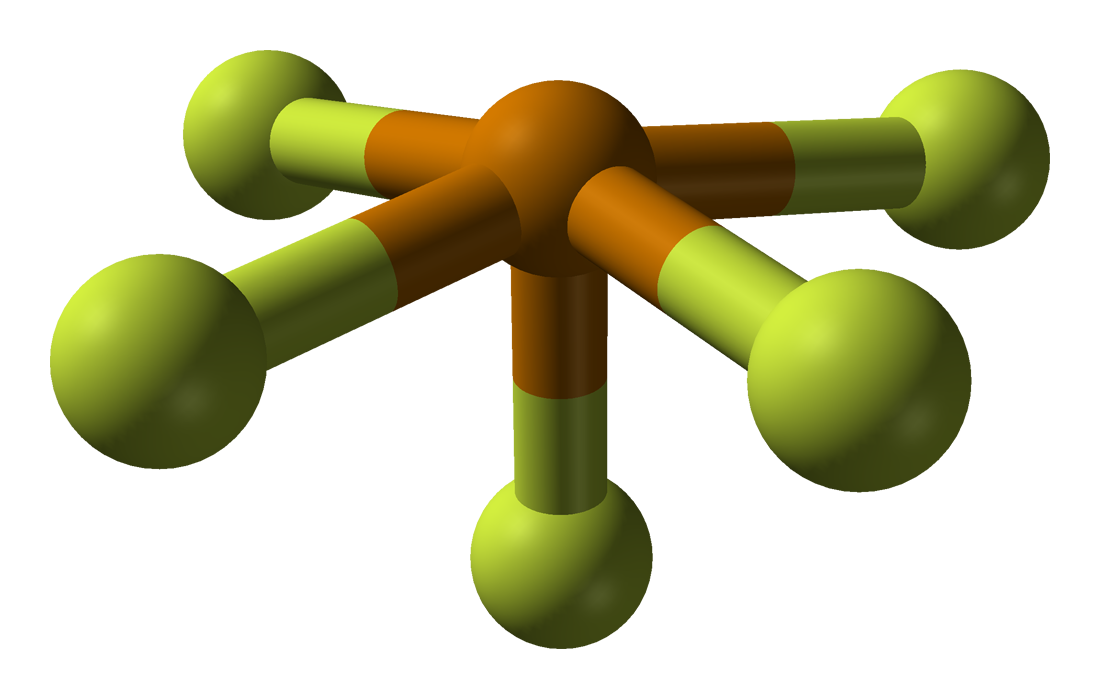
Te coordination

Tellurium tetrafluoride melts at 130 °C and decomposes to tellurium hexafluoride at 194 °C. In the solid phase, it consists of infinite chains of TeF_{3}F_{2/2} in an octahedral geometry. A lone pair of electrons occupies the sixth position.

== General references ==
- R.B. King; Inorganic Chemistry of Main Group Elements, VCH Publishers, New York, 1995.
- W.C. Cooper; Tellurium, VanNostrand Reinhold Company, New York, 1971.
