= Tellurium chloride =

Tellurium chloride may refer to any of the following compounds:

- Tellurium tetrachloride, TeCl_{4}, a volatile ionizing salt
- Tellurium dichloride, TeCl_{2}, an unstable black solid
- Ditellurium dichloride, Te_{2}Cl_{2}, a yellow liquid prepared by reaction of lithium polytellurides with TeCl_{4}.
- Tritellurium dichloride, Te_{3}Cl_{2}, a gray semiconductive polymer
- Te_{2}Cl, a metastable gray polymer decomposing to Te_{3}Cl_{2} and TeCl_{4}.
