= Selenium fluoride =

Selenium fluoride may refer to:

- Selenium tetrafluoride (selenium(IV) fluoride), SeF_{4}
- Selenium hexafluoride (selenium(VI) fluoride), SeF_{6}

== See also ==
- Seleninyl fluoride, oxyfluoride of selenium with the chemical formula SeOF_{2}
