= Selenium chloride =

Selenium chloride may refer to the following chemical compounds:

- Selenium monochloride, Se_{2}Cl_{2}
- Selenium dichloride, SeCl_{2}
- Selenium tetrachloride, SeCl_{4}
