= Tellurium fluoride =

Tellurium fluoride may refer to any of these compounds:

- Tellurium tetrafluoride, TeF_{4}
- Tellurium hexafluoride, TeF_{6}
- Ditellurium decafluoride, Te_{2}F_{10}
