= Seleninyl fluoride =

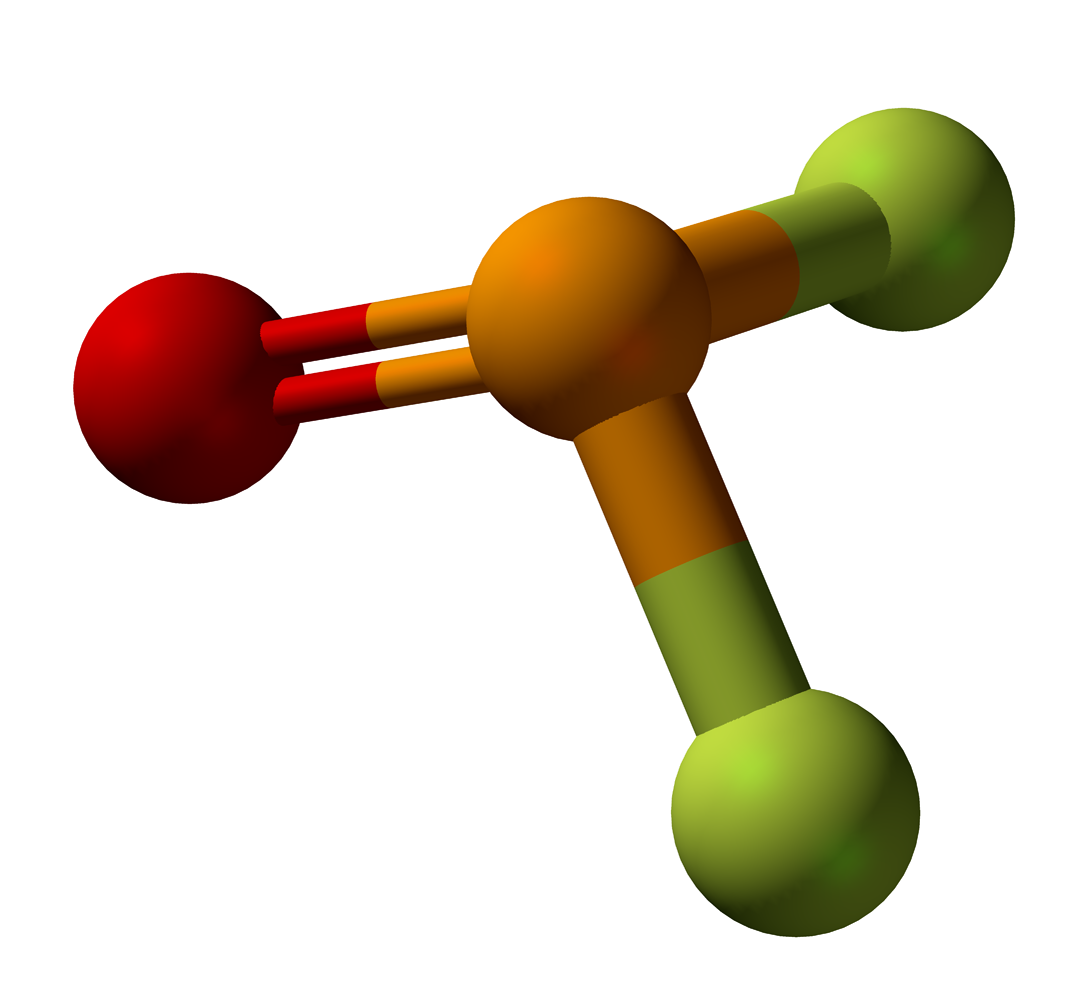

Names
- Other names selenium difluoride oxide

Identifiers
CAS Number	7783-43-9
3D model (JSmol)	Interactive image
ChemSpider	10329070
PubChem CID	23236009
UNII	U8FGC2C7TN
CompTox Dashboard (EPA)	DTXSID10703777
- InChI: InChI=1S/F2OSe/c1-4(2)3 Key: CXZZMNPTKAXBFL-UHFFFAOYSA-N
- SMILES: O=[Se](F)F

Properties
Chemical formula	F_{2}OSe
Molar mass	132.967 g·mol^{−1}
Appearance	colourless fuming liquid
Boiling point	125 °C (257 °F; 398 K)

Structure
Dipole moment	3.18±0.02 D

Related compounds
Other anions	seleninyl chloride seleninyl bromide
Other cations	thionyl fluoride
Related compounds	selenoyl fluoride
- Except where otherwise noted, data are given for materials in their standard state (at 25 °C [77 °F], 100 kPa). Infobox references

Seleninyl fluoride is an oxyfluoride of selenium with the chemical formula SeOF_{2}.

== Preparation ==
Seleninyl fluoride can be produced by the reaction of seleninyl chloride and potassium fluoride.

2 KF + SeOCl_{2} → 2 KCl + SeOF_{2}

It can also be produced by the reaction of selenium tetrafluoride with water or selenium dioxide.

SeF_{4} + H_{2}O → SeOF_{2} + 2 HF
SeF_{4} + SeO_{2} → 2 SeOF_{2}

The reaction of selenium dioxide and sulfur tetrafluoride also produces seleninyl fluoride.

SeO_{2} + SF_{4} → SeOF_{2} + SOF_{2}

== Reactions ==
Seleninyl fluoride reacts with xenon difluoride to form Xe(OSeF_{5})_{2}.

3 XeF_{2} + 2 SeOF_{2} → Xe(OSeF_{5})_{2} + 2 Xe

It reacts with fluorine gas and potassium fluoride to form pentafluoroselenium hypofluorite.

SeOF_{2} + KF → K^{+}[SeOF_{3}]^{−} —^{F_{2}}→ K^{+}[SeOF_{5}]^{−} —^{F_{2}}→ KF + SeOF_{6}

== Uses ==
Seleninyl fluoride have been used as specialty solvents.
