= Tellurium iodide =

Tellurium iodide may refer to:

- Tellurium monoiodide, TeI
- Tellurium tetraiodide, TeI_{4}
