= Subhalide =

Inorganic compound that has a low ratio of halide to metal

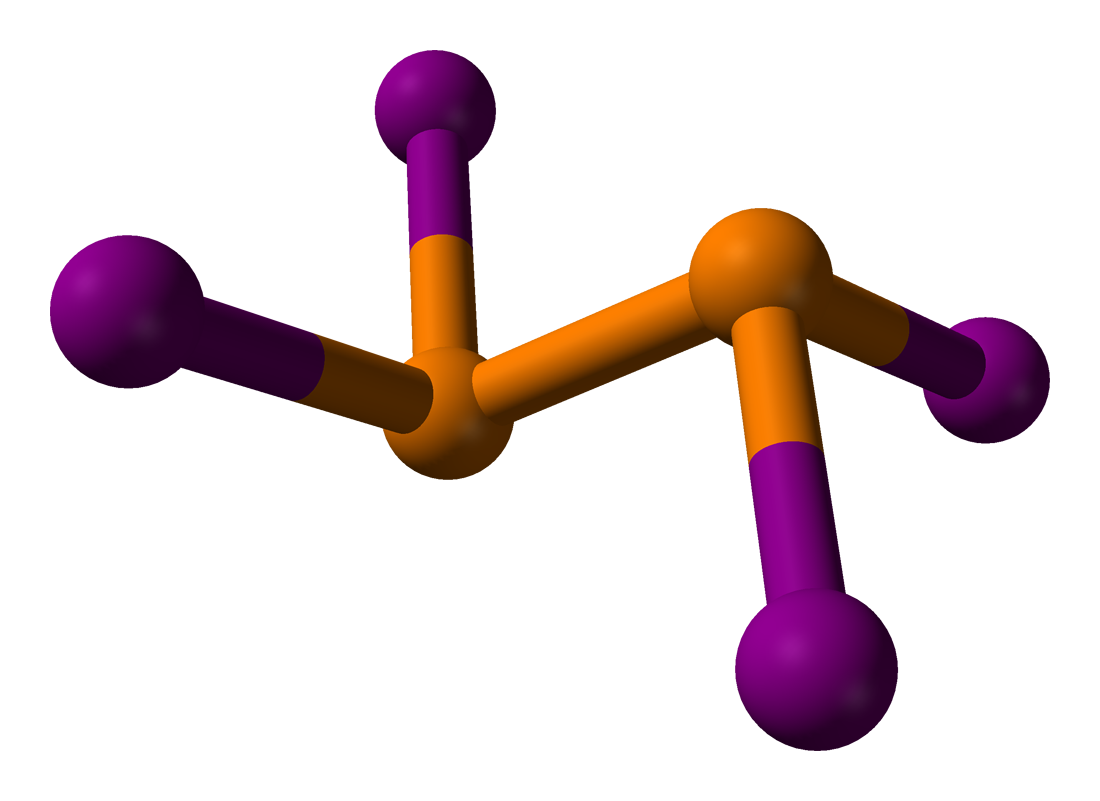
P_{2}I_{4} is a subiodide of phosphorus.

In chemistry, subhalide usually refers to inorganic compounds that have a low ratio of halide to metal, made possible by metal–metal bonding (or element–element bonding for nonmetals), sometimes extensive. Many compounds meet this definition.

== Examples ==
The normal halide of boron is BF_{3}. Boron forms many subhalides: several B_{2}X_{4}, including B_{2}F_{4}; also BF. Aluminium forms a variety of subhalides. For gallium, adducts of Ga_{2}Cl_{4} are known. Phosphorus subhalides include P_{2}I_{4}, P_{4}Cl_{2}, and P_{7}Cl_{3} (structurally related to [P_{7}]^{3−}). For bismuth, the compound originally described as bismuth monochloride was later shown to consist of [Bi_{9}]^{5+} clusters and chloride anions. There are many tellurium subhalides, including Te_{3}Cl_{2}, Te_{2}X (X = Cl, Br, I), and two forms of TeI.
