= Ammonium hexabromoselenate(IV) =

Identifiers
3D model (JSmol)	Interactive image
- InChI: InChI=1S/Br6Se.2H3N/c1-7(2,3,4,5)6;;/h;2*1H3/q-2;;/p+2 Key: FQQGNXLRBPSOCJ-UHFFFAOYSA-P
- SMILES: [NH4+].[NH4+].Br[Se-2](Br)(Br)(Br)(Br)Br

Properties
Chemical formula	Br_{6}H_{8}N_{2}Se
Molar mass	594.473 g·mol^{−1}
Appearance	red crystals
Density	3.326 g/cm^{3}
Solubility in water	reacts with water
- Except where otherwise noted, data are given for materials in their standard state (at 25 °C [77 °F], 100 kPa). Infobox references

Ammonium hexabromoselenate(IV) is an inorganic chemical compound with the chemical formula (NH_{4})_{2}[SeBr_{6}].

== Synthesis ==
Ammonium bromide is added to aqueous solutions of selenium tetrabromide acidified with hydrogen bromide:

SeBr_{4} + 2NH_{4}Br → (NH_{4})_{2}[SeBr_{6}]

Also, selenium dioxide dissolved in hydrobromic acid and treated with ammonium chloride produces the compound.

== Physical properties ==
The compound forms red crystals of the cubic system, space group Fm3m.

The compound decomposes in water.
