= Ammonium hexachloroselenate(IV) =

Identifiers
3D model (JSmol)	Interactive image
- InChI: InChI=1S/6ClH.2H3N.Se/h6*1H;2*1H3;/q;;;;;;;;+4/p-4
- SMILES: [NH4+].[NH4+].Cl[Se-2](Cl)(Cl)(Cl)(Cl)Cl

Properties
Chemical formula	Cl_{6}H_{8}N_{2}Se
Molar mass	327.75 g·mol^{−1}
Appearance	yellow crystals
Density	2.2 g/cm^{3}
Solubility in water	soluble
- Except where otherwise noted, data are given for materials in their standard state (at 25 °C [77 °F], 100 kPa). Infobox references

Ammonium hexachloroselenate(IV) is an inorganic chemical compound with the chemical formula (NH_{4})_{2}SeCl_{6}.

== Synthesis ==
Reaction of ammonium chloride and selenium tetrachloride:

SeCl_{4} + 2NH_{4}Cl → (NH_{4})_{2}SeCl_{6}

== Physical properties ==
Ammonium hexachloroselenate forms yellow crystals of the cubic system, space group Fm3m. Cell parameters are a = 0,9955 nm, Z = 4.

The compound demonstrates a phase transition at a temperature of 24 K.

It is soluble in water.
