= Tellurium monoiodide =

Tellurium iodide
Identifiers
CAS Number	12600-42-9
3D model (JSmol)	Interactive image
ChemSpider	103867644; TeI_{2}: 9146156
PubChem CID	92025674; TeI_{2}: 10970946
- InChI: InChI=1S/ITe/c1-2 Key: PNRYLQGKCSQOGH-UHFFFAOYSA-N
- SMILES: [Te]I

Properties
Chemical formula	TeI
Appearance	gray solid

Hazards
- GHS labelling
Pictograms	(GHS07: Exclamation mark)
Signal word	Warning
Hazard statements	H302, H312, H332
Precautionary statements	P261, P264, P270, P271, P280, P301+P312, P302+P352, P304+P312, P304+P340, P312, P322, P330, P363, P501

Related compounds
Other anions	ditellurium bromide
Other cations	selenium monochloride
Related compounds	tellurium tetraiodide
- Except where otherwise noted, data are given for materials in their standard state (at 25 °C [77 °F], 100 kPa). Infobox references

Tellurium iodide is an inorganic compound with the formula TeI. Two forms are known. Their structures differ from the other monohalides of tellurium. There are three subiodides of tellurium, α-TeI, β-TeI, and Te_{2}I, and one tellurium tetraiodide.

== Preparation and properties ==
TeI is a gray solid formed by the solvothermal reaction of tellurium metal and iodine in hydroiodic or chloroaluminic acid. When this reaction is conducted near 270 °C gives the α-TeI, which is triclinic. When the same mixture is heated to 150 °C, one obtains the metastable monoclinic phase β-TeI. The compounds are related structurally to Te_{2}I (see ditellurium bromide), but the additional iodide groups do not bridge to other Te centers.

The corresponding monochloride and monobromide are molecular compounds with the formula Te_{2}X_{2}.

== Tellurium diiodide ==
Although TeI_{2} has not been isolated in bulk, complexes of the type TeI_{2}(thiourea)_{2} are well characterized. These complexes precipitate upon treatment of aqueous solutions of the related tellurium dibromide complex with sodium iodide.

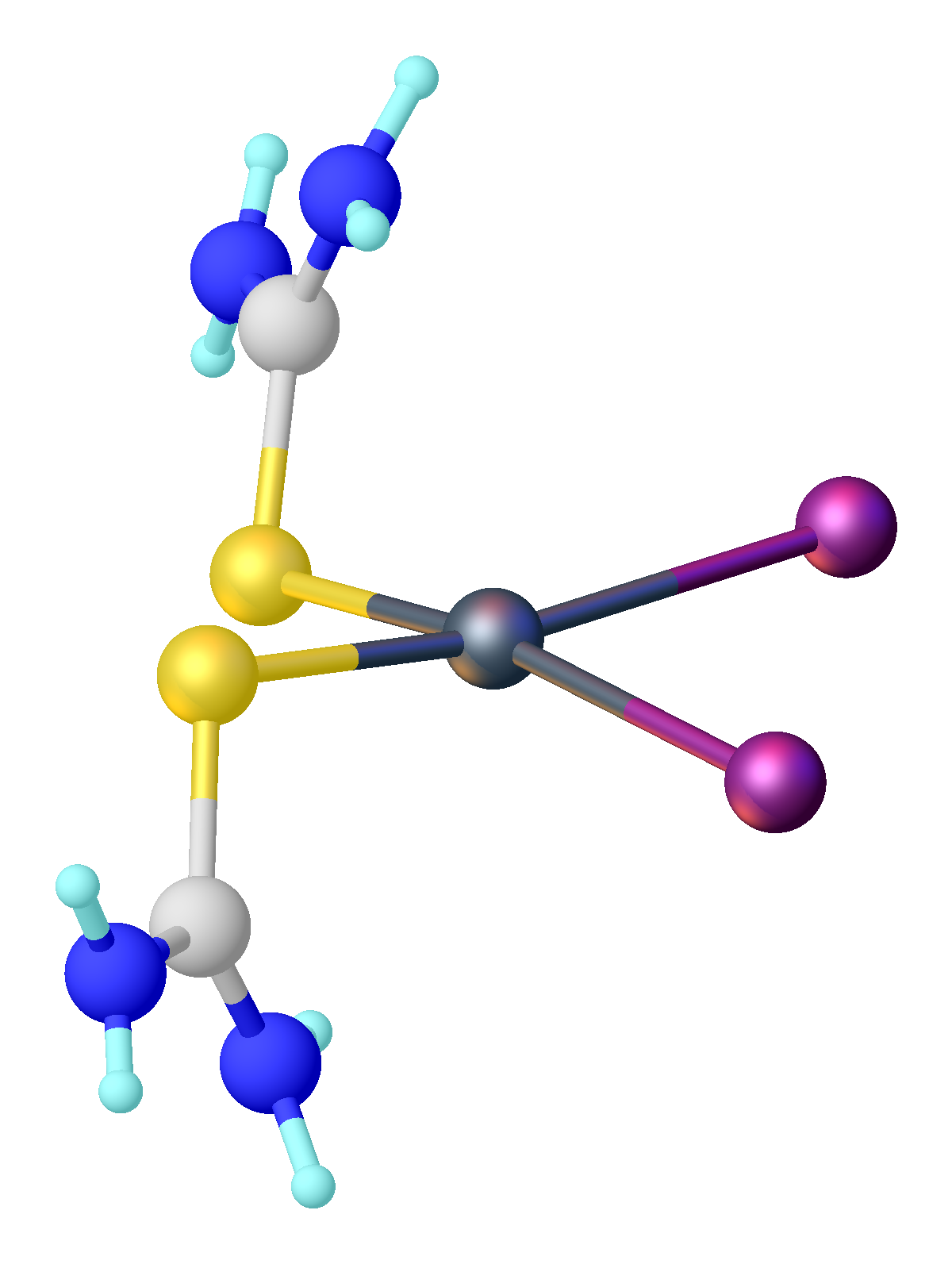
Structure of TeI_{2}(thiourea)_{2}.
