= Tellurium tetrabromide =

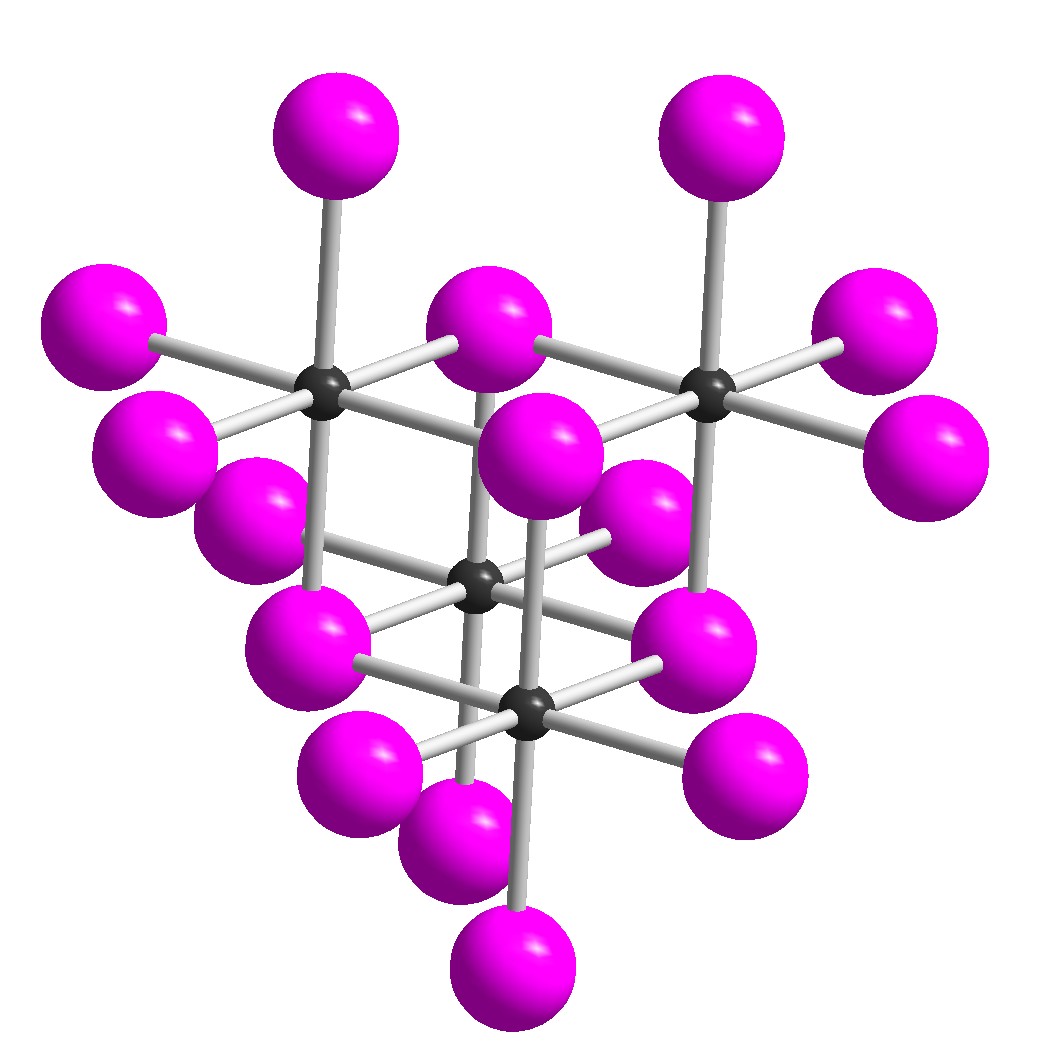
- Tellurium tetrabromide

Identifiers
CAS Number	10031-27-3
3D model (JSmol)	Interactive image
ChemSpider	74282
ECHA InfoCard	100.030.070
EC Number	233-090-7
PubChem CID	82311
UNII	7A29EFJ1AF
CompTox Dashboard (EPA)	DTXSID5064914
- InChI: InChI=1S/Br4Te/c1-5(2,3)4 Key: PTYIPBNVDTYPIO-UHFFFAOYSA-N
- SMILES: Br[Te](Br)(Br)Br

Properties
Chemical formula	TeBr_{4}
Molar mass	447.22 g/mol
Appearance	yellow-orange crystals
Density	4.3 g/cm^{3}, solid
Melting point	388 °C (730 °F; 661 K)
Boiling point	decomposes at 420 °C (788 °F; 693 K)

Structure
Crystal structure	monoclinic

Hazards
- GHS labelling
Pictograms	(GHS05: Corrosive) (GHS06: Toxic)
Signal word	Danger
Hazard statements	H301, H314
Precautionary statements	P260, P264, P280, P301+P330+P331, P303+P361+P353, P304+P340, P305+P351+P338, P310, P321, P363, P405, P501

Related compounds
Other anions	Tellurium tetrafluoride Tellurium tetrachloride Tellurium tetraiodide
Other cations	Selenium tetrabromide
Related compounds	Ditellurium bromide
- Except where otherwise noted, data are given for materials in their standard state (at 25 °C [77 °F], 100 kPa). Infobox references

Tellurium tetrabromide (TeBr_{4}) is an inorganic chemical compound. It has a similar tetrameric structure to TeCl_{4}. It can be made by reacting bromine and tellurium. In the vapour TeBr_{4} dissociates:

TeBr_{4} → TeBr_{2} + Br_{2}

It is a conductor when molten, dissociating into the ions TeBr_{3}^{+} and Br^{−}. When dissolved in benzene and toluene, TeBr_{4} is present as the unionized tetramer Te_{4}Br_{16}. In solvents with donor properties such as acetonitrile, CH_{3}CN ionic complexes are formed which make the solution conducting:

TeBr_{4} + 2CH_{3}CN → (CH_{3}CN)_{2}TeBr_{3}^{+} + Br^{−}
