= Seleninyl chloride =

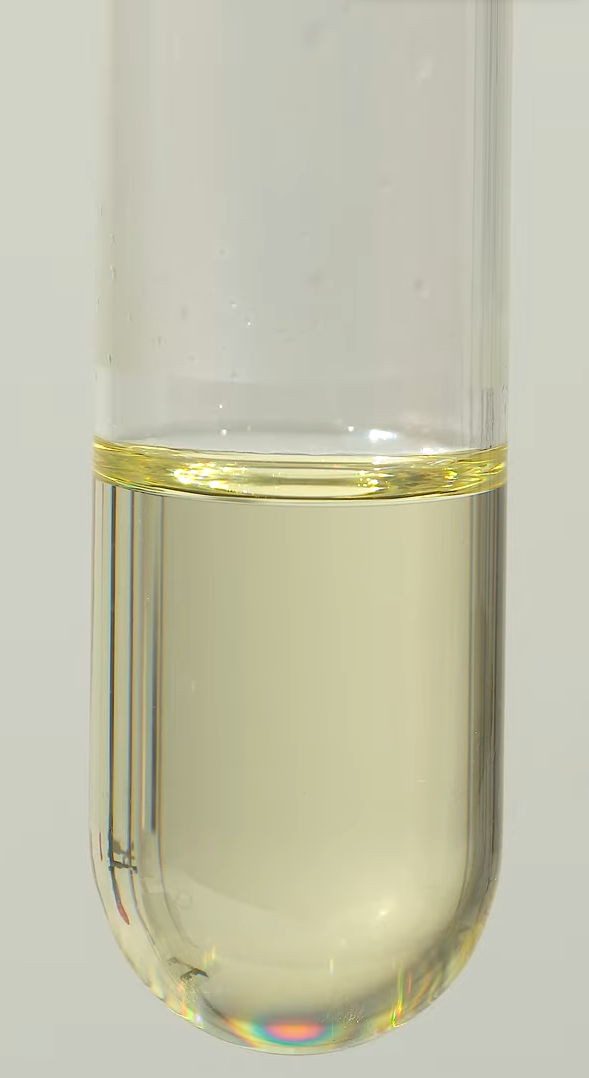

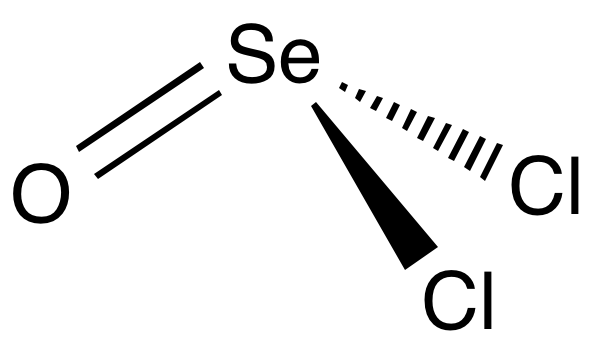
Structure of the seleninyl chloride molecule
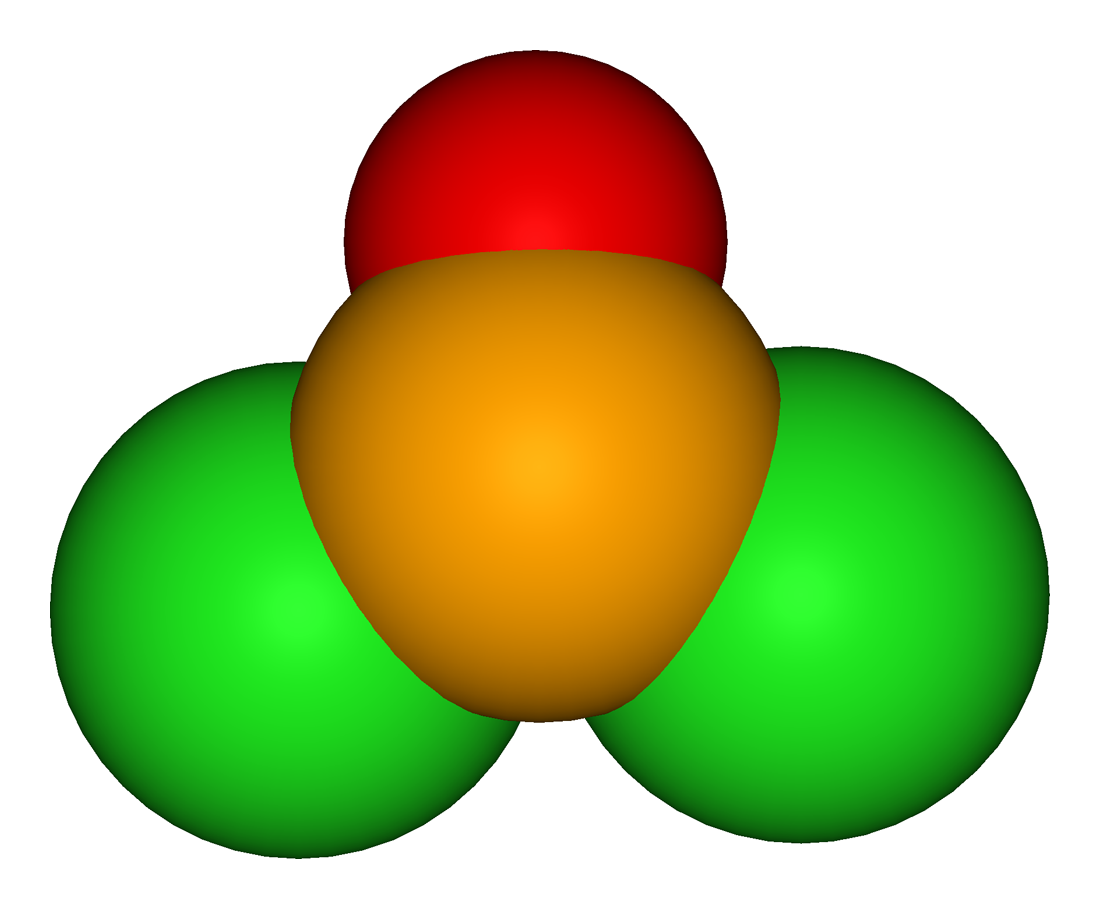
3D model of the seleninyl chloride molecule

Names
- IUPAC name Seleninyl chloride
- Other names Selenium oxydichloride Selenium oxychloride

Identifiers
CAS Number	7791-23-3
3D model (JSmol)	Interactive image
ChemSpider	23049
ECHA InfoCard	100.029.313
EC Number	232-244-0
PubChem CID	24647
RTECS number	VS7000000
UNII	1G57T5401W
CompTox Dashboard (EPA)	DTXSID50884438
- InChI: InChI=1S/Cl2OSe/c1-4(2)3 Key: LIRMPIXWGWLNND-UHFFFAOYSA-N; InChI=1/Cl2OSe/c1-4(2)3 Key: LIRMPIXWGWLNND-UHFFFAOYAX
- SMILES: O=[Se](Cl)Cl

Properties
Chemical formula	SeOCl_{2}
Molar mass	165.87 g/mol
Appearance	colorless liquid
Density	2.43 g/cm^{3}, liquid
Melting point	10.9 °C (51.6 °F; 284.0 K)
Boiling point	177.2 °C (351.0 °F; 450.3 K)
Refractive index (n_{D})	1.651 (20 °C)

Structure
Molecular shape	trigonal pyramidal

Hazards
- GHS labelling
Pictograms	(GHS05: Corrosive) (GHS06: Toxic) (GHS08: Health hazard) (GHS09: Environmental hazard)
Signal word	Warning
Hazard statements	H301, H314, H331, H373, H410
Precautionary statements	P260, P264, P270, P271, P273, P280, P301+P310, P301+P330+P331, P303+P361+P353, P304+P340, P305+P351+P338, P310, P311, P314, P321, P330, P363, P391, P403+P233, P405, P501
NFPA 704 (fire diamond)	3 0 1
- Lethal dose or concentration (LD, LC)
LD_{Lo} (lowest published)	2 mg/kg (rabbit, dermal)

Related compounds
Related compounds	SOCl_{2}, POCl_{3}
- Except where otherwise noted, data are given for materials in their standard state (at 25 °C [77 °F], 100 kPa). verify (what is ?) Infobox references

Seleninyl chloride is the inorganic compound with the formula SeOCl_{2}. It is a colorless liquid. With a high dielectric constant (55) and high specific conductance, it is an attractive solvent. Structurally, it is a close chemical relative of thionyl chloride SOCl_{2}, being a pyramidal molecule.

== Preparation and reactions ==
Seleninyl chloride can be prepared by several methods, and a common one involves the conversion of selenium dioxide to dichloroselenious acid followed by dehydration:

SeO_{2} + 2 HCl → Se(OH)_{2}Cl_{2}
Se(OH)_{2}Cl_{2} → SeOCl_{2} + H_{2}O

The original synthesis involved the redistribution reaction of selenium dioxide and selenium tetrachloride.

Pure seleninyl chloride autoionizes to a dimer:

SeOCl_{2} ↔ (SeO)_{2}Cl^{+}_{3} + Cl^{−}

The SeOCl_{2} is generally a labile Lewis acid and solutions of sulfur trioxide in SeOCl_{2} likely form [SeOCl]^{+}[SO_{3}Cl]^{−} the same way.

The compound hydrolyzes readily to form hydrogen chloride and selenium dioxide, and very few organic compounds dissolve in it without reaction. At elevated temperatures, it is a strong oxidizer, yielding a chloride, selenium dioxide, and diselenium dichloride.

== See also ==
- Seleninyl bromide (SeOBr_{2})
- Selenous acid (H_{2}SeO_{3})
