= Tellurium dichloride =

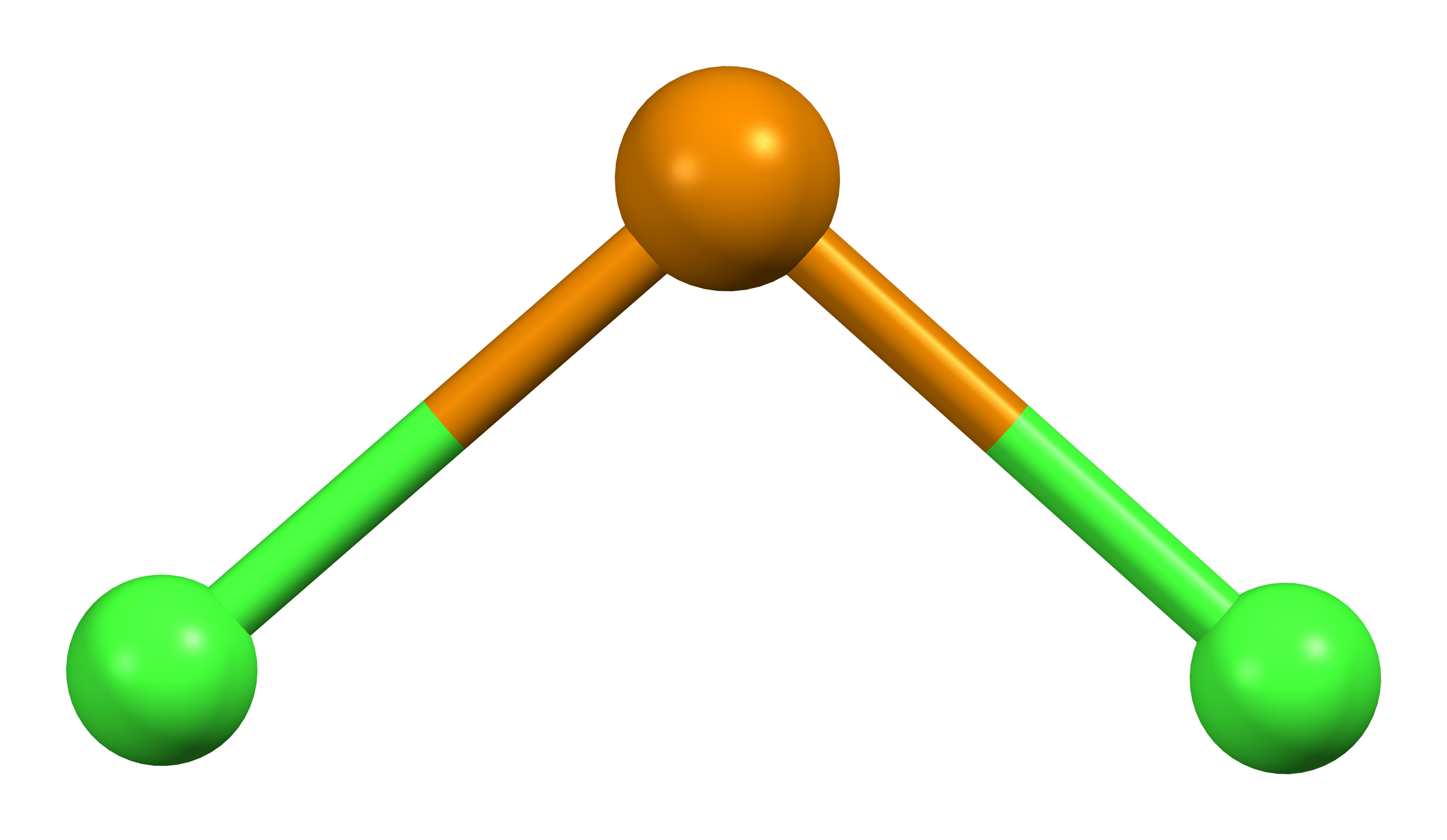

Identifiers
CAS Number	10025-71-5
3D model (JSmol)	Interactive image
ChemSpider	2588376
PubChem CID	3341691
UNII	0T7J7SHH1H
CompTox Dashboard (EPA)	DTXSID60143068
- InChI: InChI=1S/Cl2Te/c1-3-2 Key: VXLPBEHPTWIBJR-UHFFFAOYSA-N
- SMILES: Cl[Te]Cl

Properties
Chemical formula	Cl_{2}Te
Molar mass	198.50 g·mol^{−1}
Appearance	black solid
Density	6.9 g·cm^{−3}
Melting point	208 °C
Boiling point	328 °C
Solubility in water	reacts
Solubility	reacts with diethyl ether, insoluble in tetrachloromethane

Related compounds
Other anions	Ditellurium bromide, Te_{2}Br
Other cations	Dichlorine monoxide, OCl_{2} Sulfur dichloride, SCl_{2} Selenium dichloride, SeCl_{2} Polonium dichloride, PoCl_{2}
Related compounds	Tritellurium dichloride, Te_{3}Cl_{2} Tellurium tetrachloride, TeCl_{4}
- Except where otherwise noted, data are given for materials in their standard state (at 25 °C [77 °F], 100 kPa). Infobox references

Tellurium dichloride is a chloride of tellurium with the chemical formula TeCl_{2}. It is a lightly characterized material that has attracted little attention.

== Preparation ==
Tellurium dichloride is claimed as the product of the reaction of tellurium with difluorodichloromethane. It can also be produced by the comproportionation of tellurium and tellurium tetrachloride.

== Properties ==
Tellurium dichloride is a black solid that reacts with water. It melts into a black liquid and vapourizes into a purple gas. The gas consists of monomeric TeCl_{2} molecules with Te–Cl bond lengths of 2.329 Å and a Cl–Te–Cl bond angle of 97.0°.

Tellurium dichloride (TeCl_{2}) is unstable with respect to disproportionation. Several complexes of it are known and well characterized. They are prepared by treating tellurium dioxide with hydrochloric acid in the presence of thioureas. The thiourea serves both as a ligand and as a reductant, converting Te(IV) to Te(II).

Although tellurium dichloride is lightly studied, molecular adducts of the title compound are well characterized.

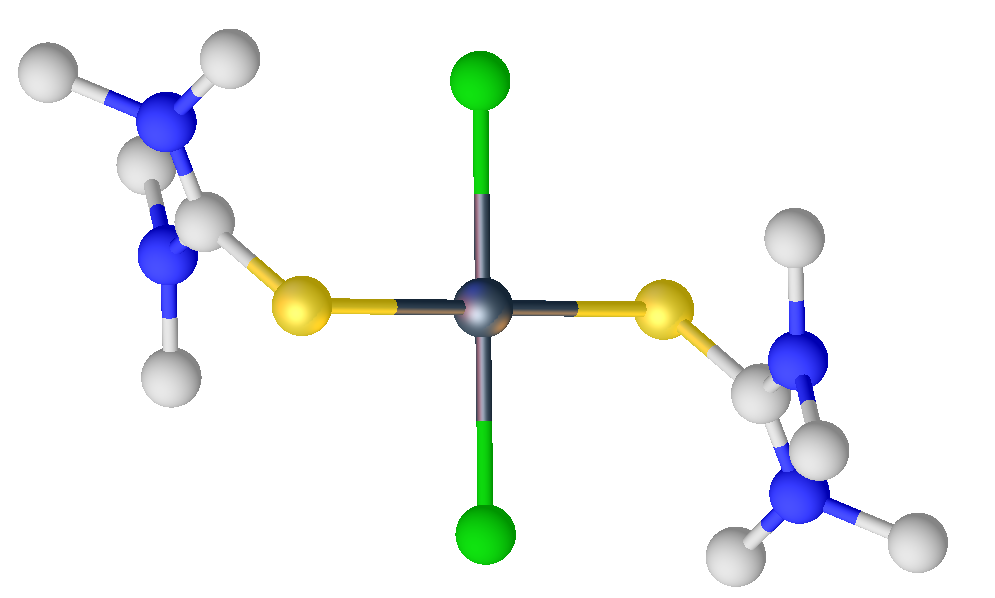
Structure of trans-[TeCl_{2}(SC(NMe_{2})_{2})_{2}] (H atoms omitted). Color code: green = Cl, dark gray = Te, yellow = S.
