= Selenium dibromide =

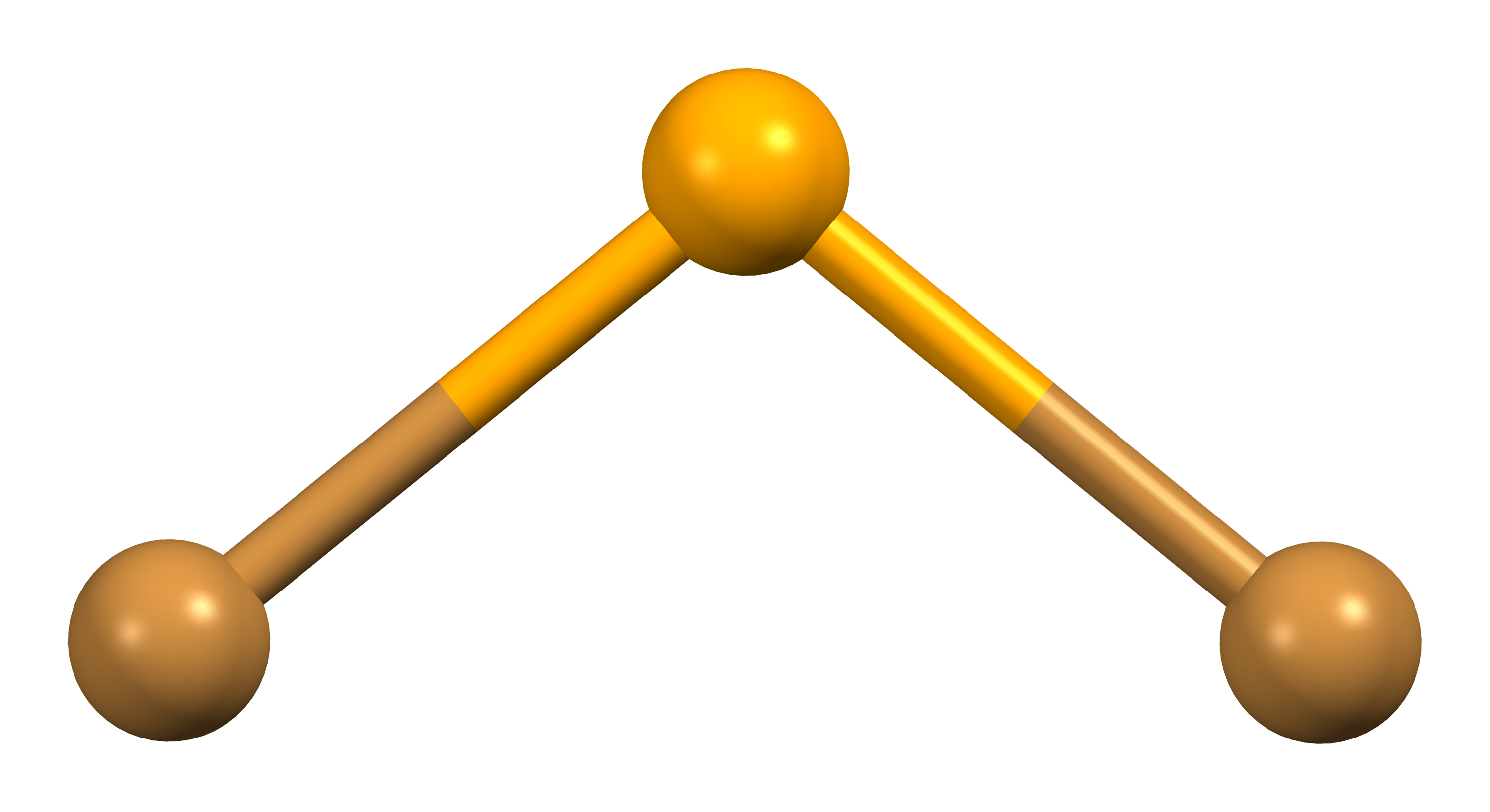

Names
- IUPAC name Bromo selenohypobromite
- Systematic IUPAC name Selenium dibromide

Identifiers
CAS Number	22987-45-7
3D model (JSmol)	Interactive image
ChemSpider	124350
PubChem CID	140977
UNII	6WRB0BWV8E
CompTox Dashboard (EPA)	DTXSID30177532
- InChI: InChI=1S/Br2Se/c1-3-2 Key: MNBLRJWKVLRTKV-UHFFFAOYSA-N
- SMILES: [Se](Br)Br

Properties
Chemical formula	Br_{2}Se
Molar mass	238.779 g·mol^{−1}

Related compounds
Other anions	Selenium dichloride, SeCl_{2}
Other cations	Sulfur dibromide, SBr_{2}
Related compounds	Selenium tetrabromide, SeBr_{4}
- Except where otherwise noted, data are given for materials in their standard state (at 25 °C [77 °F], 100 kPa). Infobox references

Selenium dibromide is a compound made of one selenium and two bromine atoms. It is unstable. No solid form of the compound has been discovered but it is a component of the equilibria in the vapour above selenium tetrabromide (SeBr_{4}) and in nonaqueous solutions. In acetonitrile solution, selenium reacts with SeBr_{4} to form an equilibrium mixture containing SeBr_{2}, Se_{2}Br_{2} and Br_{2}. This covalent compound has a bent molecular geometry in the gas phase.
