= Seleninyl bromide =

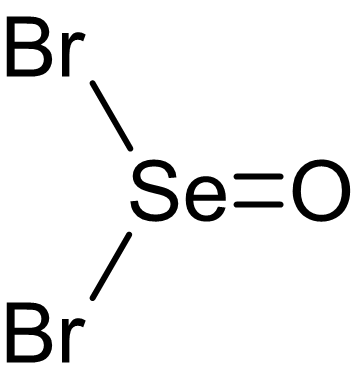
- Seleninyl bromide

Identifiers
CAS Number	7789-51-7
3D model (JSmol)	Interactive image
ChemSpider	74220
ECHA InfoCard	100.029.247
PubChem CID	82242
UNII	B4NK717O2R
CompTox Dashboard (EPA)	DTXSID2064866
- InChI: InChI=1S/Br2OSe/c1-4(2)3 Key: ZWTYAOCEBBZVQQ-UHFFFAOYSA-N; InChI=1/Br2OSe/c1-4(2)3 Key: ZWTYAOCEBBZVQQ-UHFFFAOYAF
- SMILES: Br[Se](Br)=O

Properties
Chemical formula	SeOBr_{2}
Molar mass	254.77 g/mol
Appearance	red-yellow solid
Density	3.38 g/cm^{3}, solid
Melting point	41.6 °C (106.9 °F; 314.8 K)
Boiling point	decomposes at 220 °C (428 °F; 493 K)
Solubility in water	reacts
Solubility	soluble in carbon disulfide, benzene, carbon tetrachloride
- Except where otherwise noted, data are given for materials in their standard state (at 25 °C [77 °F], 100 kPa). verify (what is ?) Infobox references

Seleninyl bromidee (SeOBr_{2}) is a selenium oxohalide chemical compound.

== Preparation ==
Seleninyl bromide can be prepared through the reaction of selenium dioxide and selenium tetrabromide. Selenium and selenium dioxide are reacted with bromine to form selenium monobromide and selenium tetrabromide. Dissolving the selenium dioxide in the tetrabromide will produce the seleninyl bromide.

2 Se + Br_{2} → Se_{2}Br_{2}
Se_{2}Br_{2} + 3 Br_{2} → 2 SeBr_{4}
SeBr_{4} + SeO_{2} → 2 SeOBr_{2}

== Structure ==
Evidence from infrared and polarized Raman spectroscopy suggests that seleninyl bromide adopts a pyramidal molecular geometry with C_{s} symmetry, like other chalcogen(IV) oxohalides such as thionyl bromide (SOBr_{2}) and seleninyl dichloride (SeOCl_{2}).

== Properties ==
Seleninyl bromide is a reddish-brown solid with a low melting point (41.6 °C) and chemical properties similar to seleninyl chloride. It boils at 220 °C and decomposes near the boiling point, making distillation an ineffective purification method. Its electrical conductivity in the liquid state just above the melting temperature is 6×10^{−5} S/m. SeOBr_{2} is hydrolyzed by water to form H_{2}SeO_{3} and HBr.

SeOBr_{2} is highly reactive, with most reactions taking place in the liquid state. Selenium will dissolve in it, forming Se_{2}Br_{2}. Iron, copper, gold, platinum, and zinc are all attacked by SeOBr_{2}.
