= Selenium tetrabromide =

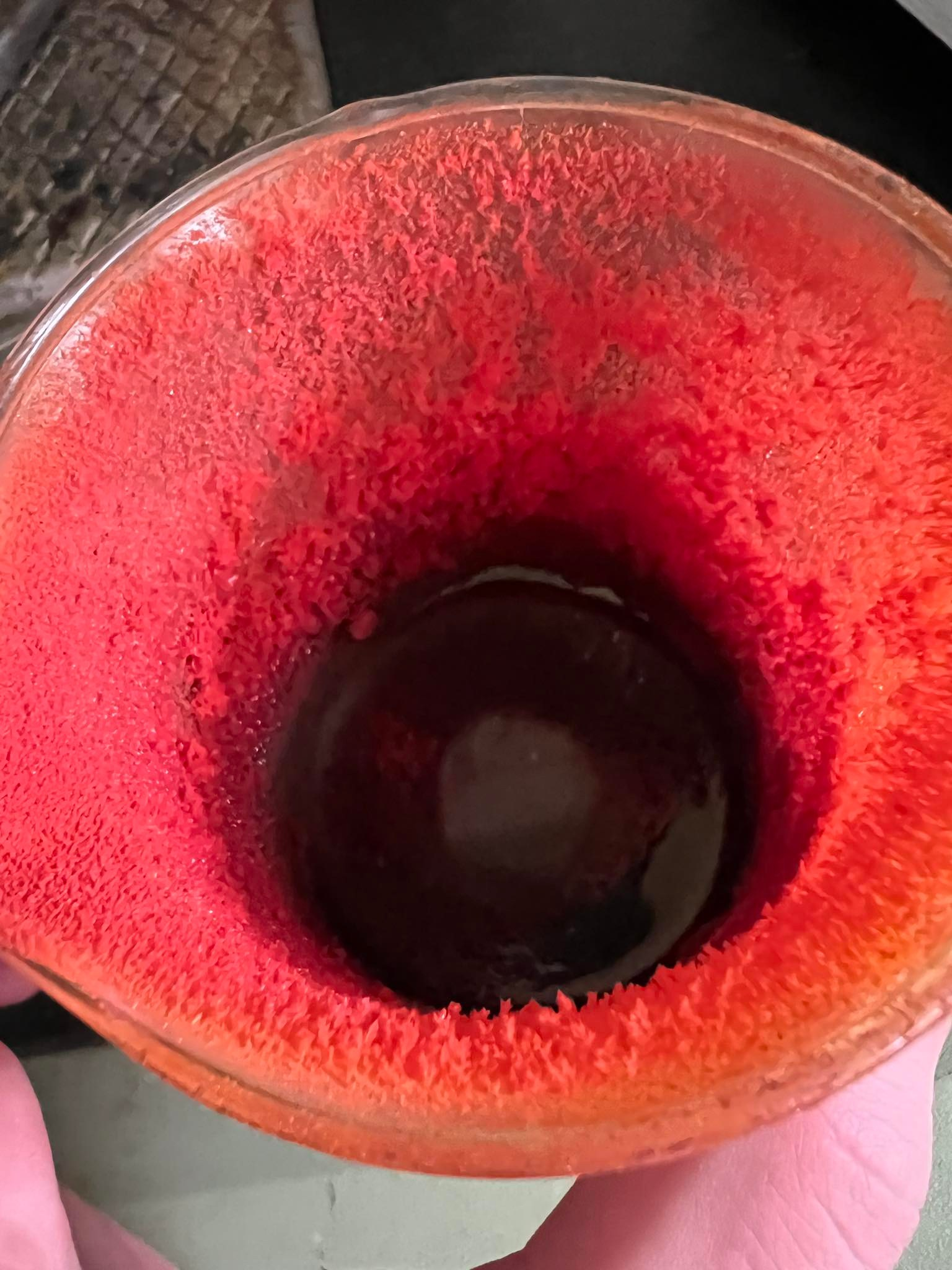

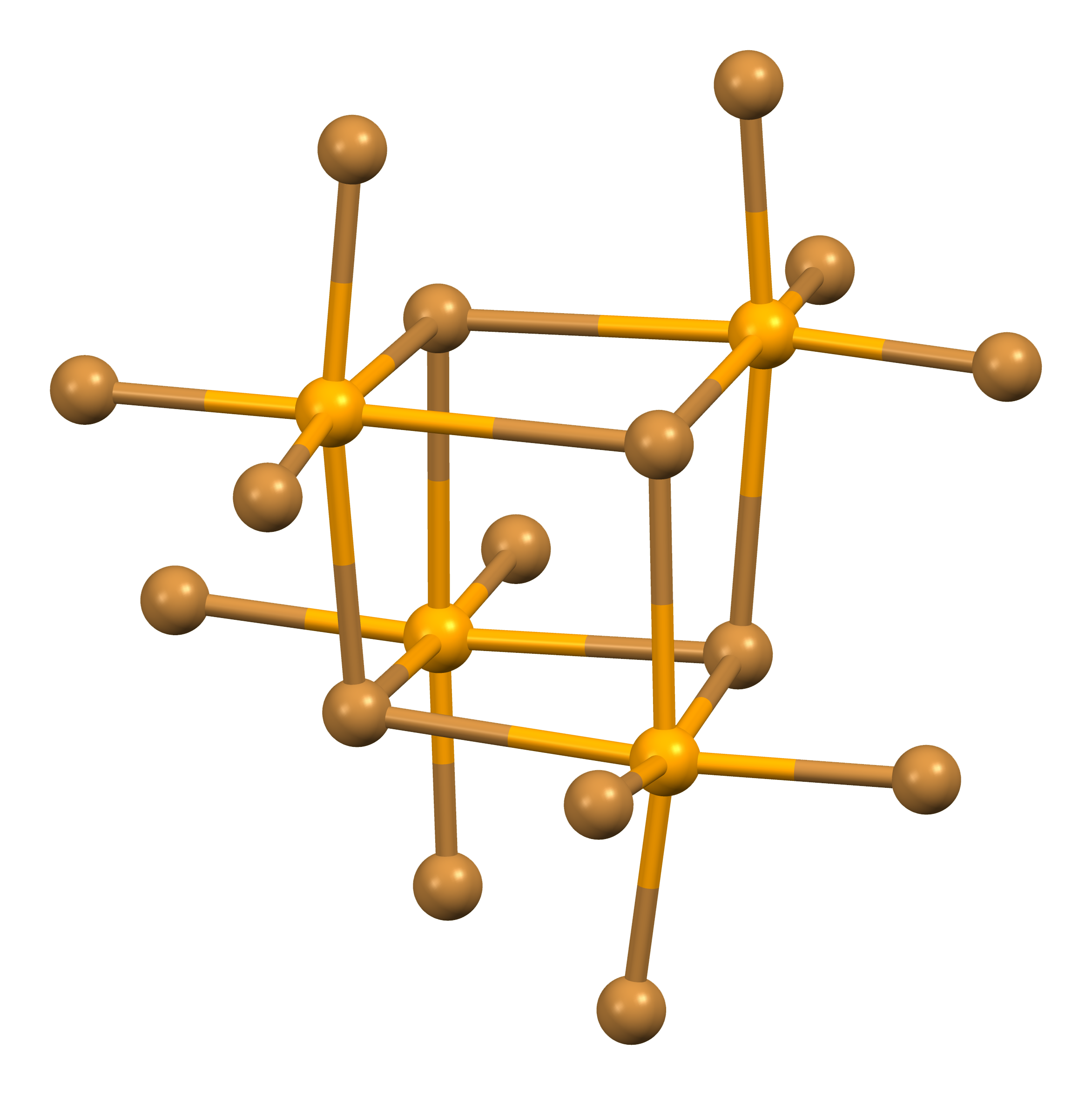

Names
- IUPAC name Tetrabromo-λ^{4}-selane
- Other names Selenium tetrabromide, selenium(IV) bromide

Identifiers
CAS Number	7789-65-3
3D model (JSmol)	Interactive image
ChemSpider	74224
ECHA InfoCard	100.029.256
EC Number	232-181-9
PubChem CID	82246
UNII	8O54YXR180
CompTox Dashboard (EPA)	DTXSID1064871
- InChI: InChI=1S/Br4Se/c1-5(2,3)4 Key: VTQZBGAODFEJOW-UHFFFAOYSA-N; InChI=1/Br4Se/c1-5(2,3)4 Key: VTQZBGAODFEJOW-UHFFFAOYAY
- SMILES: Br[Se](Br)(Br)Br

Properties
Chemical formula	SeBr_{4}
Molar mass	398.576
Density	4.029 g/cm^{3}
Melting point	75 °C (167 °F; 348 K) (dissolves)
Boiling point	115 °C (239 °F; 388 K) (sublimes)

Structure
Crystal structure	trigonal (α) monoclinic (β)
Space group	P31c, No. 159 (α); C2/c, No.15 (β)
Formula units (Z)	16

Hazards
- GHS labelling
Pictograms	(GHS05: Corrosive) (GHS06: Toxic) (GHS08: Health hazard) (GHS09: Environmental hazard)
Signal word	Danger
Hazard statements	H301, H311, H314, H331, H351, H373, H410
Precautionary statements	P201, P202, P260, P264, P270, P271, P273, P280, P281, P301+P310, P301+P330+P331, P302+P352, P303+P361+P353, P304+P340, P305+P351+P338, P308+P313, P310, P311, P312, P314, P321, P322, P330, P361, P363, P391, P403+P233, P405, P501

Related compounds
Other anions	Selenium tetrafluoride Selenium tetrachloride
Other cations	Tellurium tetrabromide
Related compounds	Selenium dibromide
- Except where otherwise noted, data are given for materials in their standard state (at 25 °C [77 °F], 100 kPa). Infobox references

Selenium tetrabromide is an inorganic compound with a chemical formula SeBr_{4}.

== Preparation ==
Selenium tetrabromide could be produced by mixing elemental bromine and selenium:

Se + 2Br_{2} → SeBr_{4}

== Properties ==
Selenium tetrabromide exists in two polymorphs, the trigonal, black α-SeBr_{4} and the monoclinic, orange-reddish β-SeBr_{4}, both of which feature tetrameric cubane-like Se_{4}Br_{16} units but differ in how they are arranged. It dissolves in carbon disulfide, chloroform and ethyl bromide, but decomposes in water, so that it produces selenous acid in wet air.

The compound is only stable under a bromine-saturated atmosphere; gas phase measurements of the gas density indicate that the compound decomposes into selenium monobromide and bromine.

2SeBr_{4} → Se_{2}Br_{2} + 3Br_{2}
