= Cubane-type cluster =

Molecular structure which forms a cube

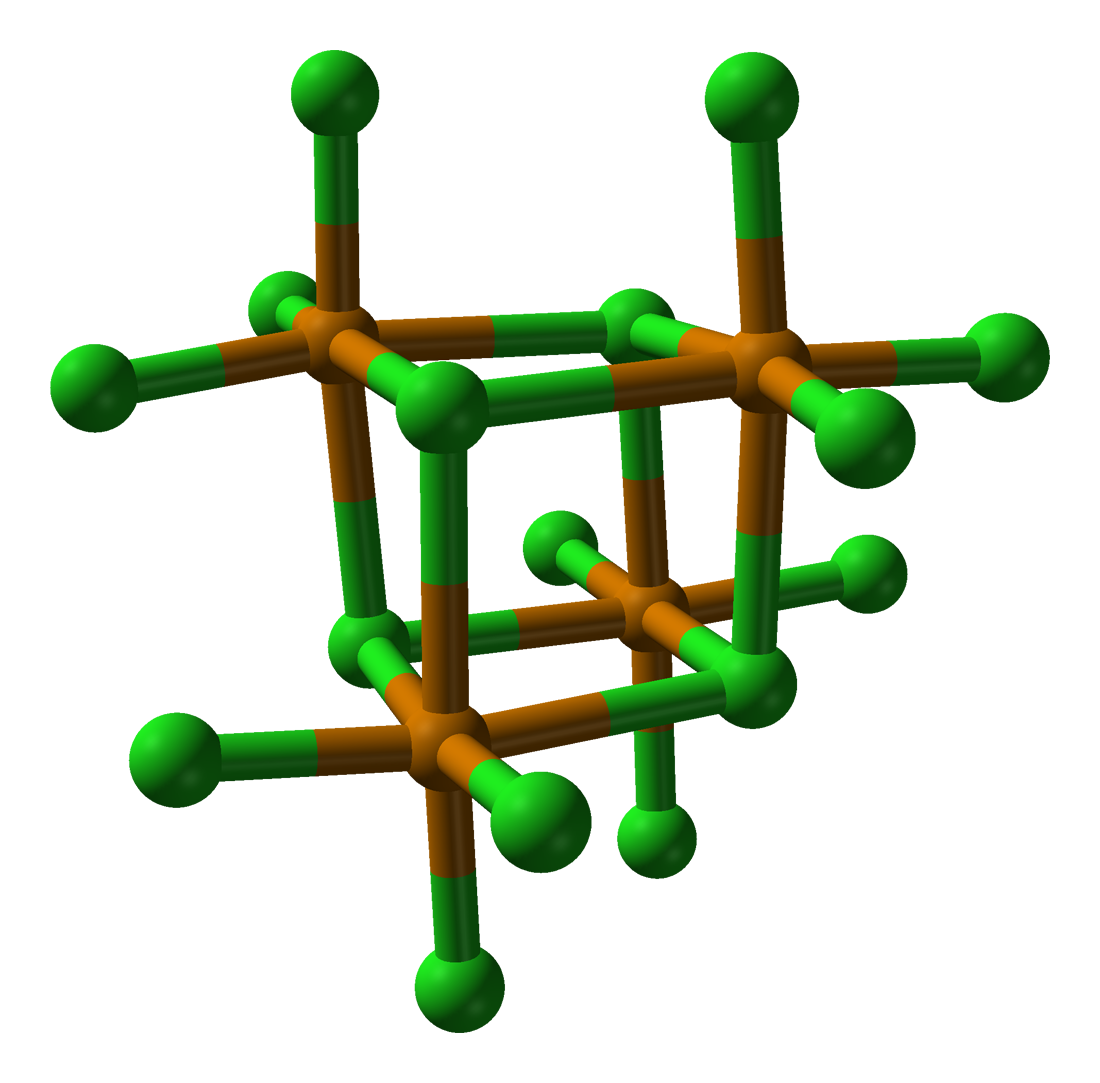
Tellurium tetrachloride cubane-like cluster.

A cubane-type cluster is an arrangement of atoms in a molecular structure that forms a cube. In the simplest case, the eight vertices are symmetry equivalent and the species has O_{h} symmetry. Such structure occurs in the hydrocarbon cubane (chemical formula C_{8}H_{8}), which has carbon atoms at the corners of a cube and covalent bonds forming the edges.

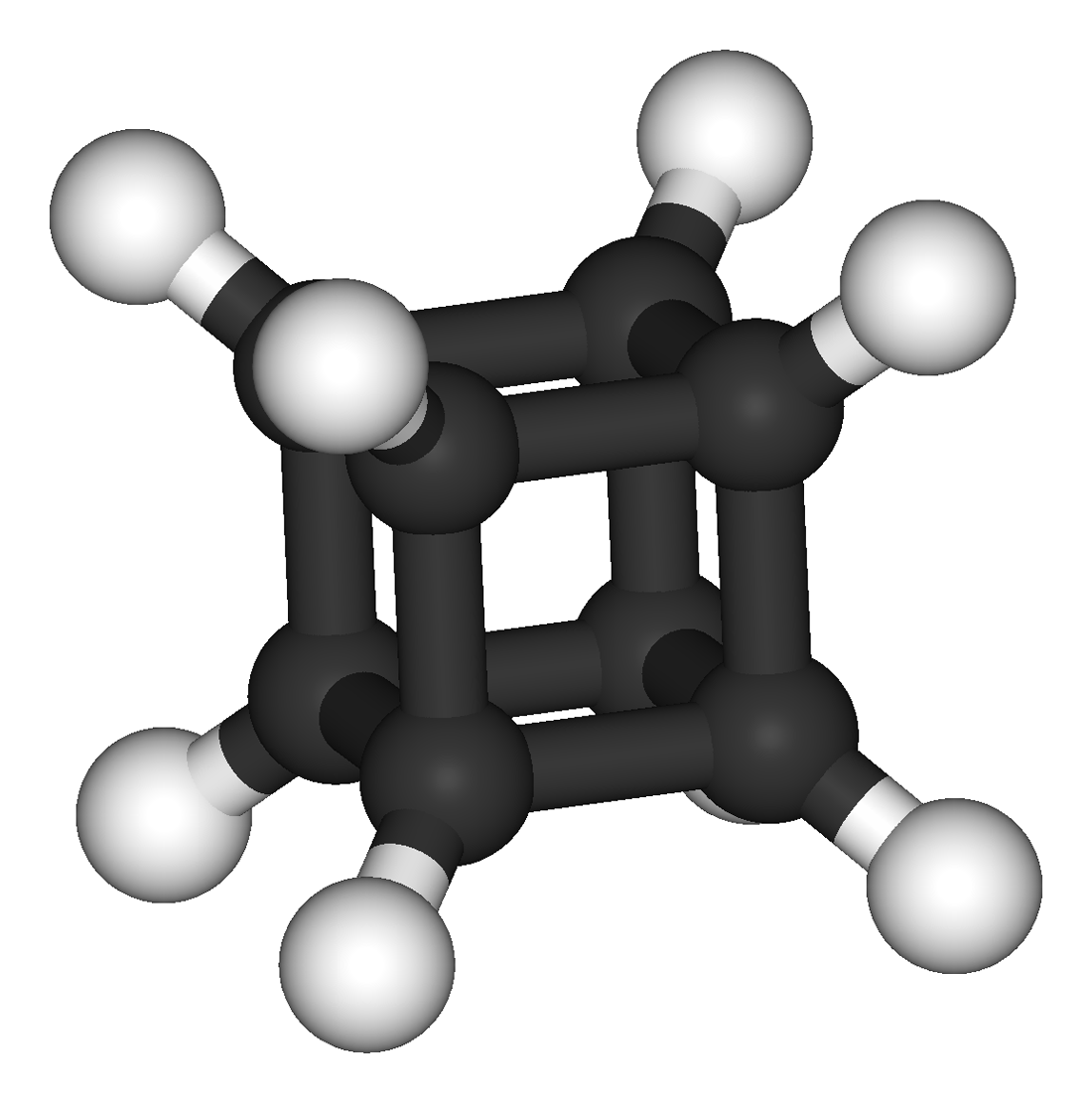
Cubane, the parent compound for the class

Other compounds in the class have different elements in the corners, and various atoms or groups bonded to the corners. Most cubanes have more complicated structures, usually with nonequivalent vertices. They may be simple covalent compounds or macromolecular or supramolecular cluster compounds.

== Examples ==
Heavier adamantogen cubanes with all vertices identical are all known, and exhibit only about half as much strain energy as cubane per molecule. The inert pair effect is believed to drive stability in cubanes with heavy main group elements: the bonding orbitals are almost entirely unhybridized p orbitals, and so naturally adopt 90° angles at the vertices.

Simple inorganic cubane-type clusters include selenium tetrachloride, tellurium tetrachloride, and sodium silox. Many alkyllithium compounds, including methyllithium and tert-butyllithium, exist as tetrameric clusters in solution. The four lithium atoms and the carbon from each alkyl group bonded to them occupy alternating vertices of the cube, with the additional atoms of the alkyl groups projecting off their respective corners. Tetra‑tert‑butyl tetraphosphacubane has been made in low yield from spontaneous tetramerization of pivalophosphile, tBu-C≡P; and oxidizing a related diphosphabicyclobutane-zirconocene complex obtains higher yields.

Cubane clusters are common throughout bioinorganic chemistry. Ferredoxins containing [Fe_{4}S_{4}] iron–sulfur clusters are pervasive in nature. The four iron atoms and four sulfur atoms form an alternating arrangement at the corners. The whole cluster is typically anchored by coordination of the iron atoms, usually with cysteine residues. In this way, each Fe center achieves tetrahedral coordination geometry. Some [Fe_{4}S_{4}] clusters arise via dimerization of square-shaped [Fe_{2}S_{2}] precursors. Many synthetic analogues are known including heterometallic derivatives.

Illustrative Cubane Clusters

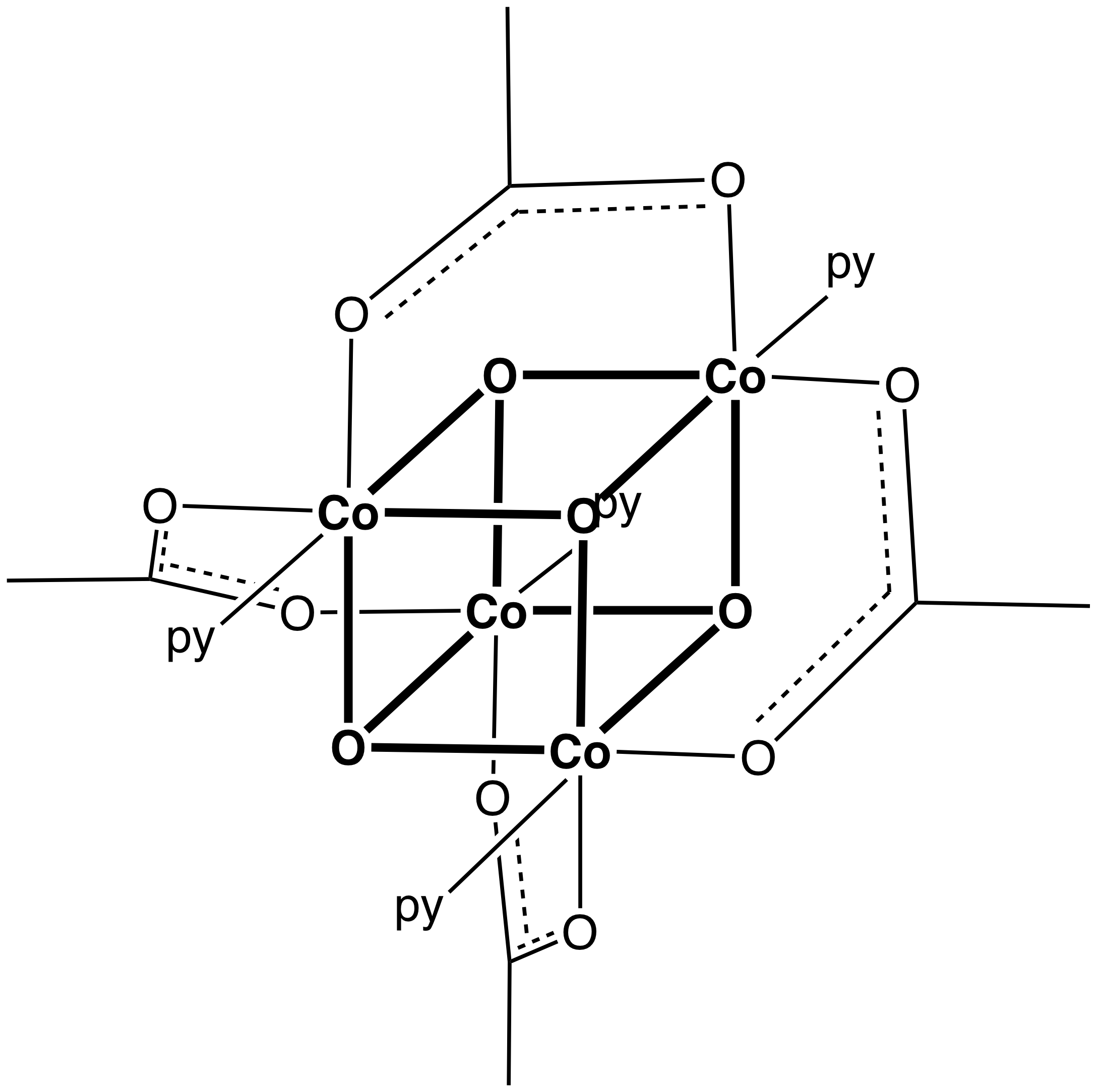
Das cubane, [CoO(OAc)py]_{4} (OAc = acetate; py = pyridine)

Ferredoxin (4Fe-4S-cubane)

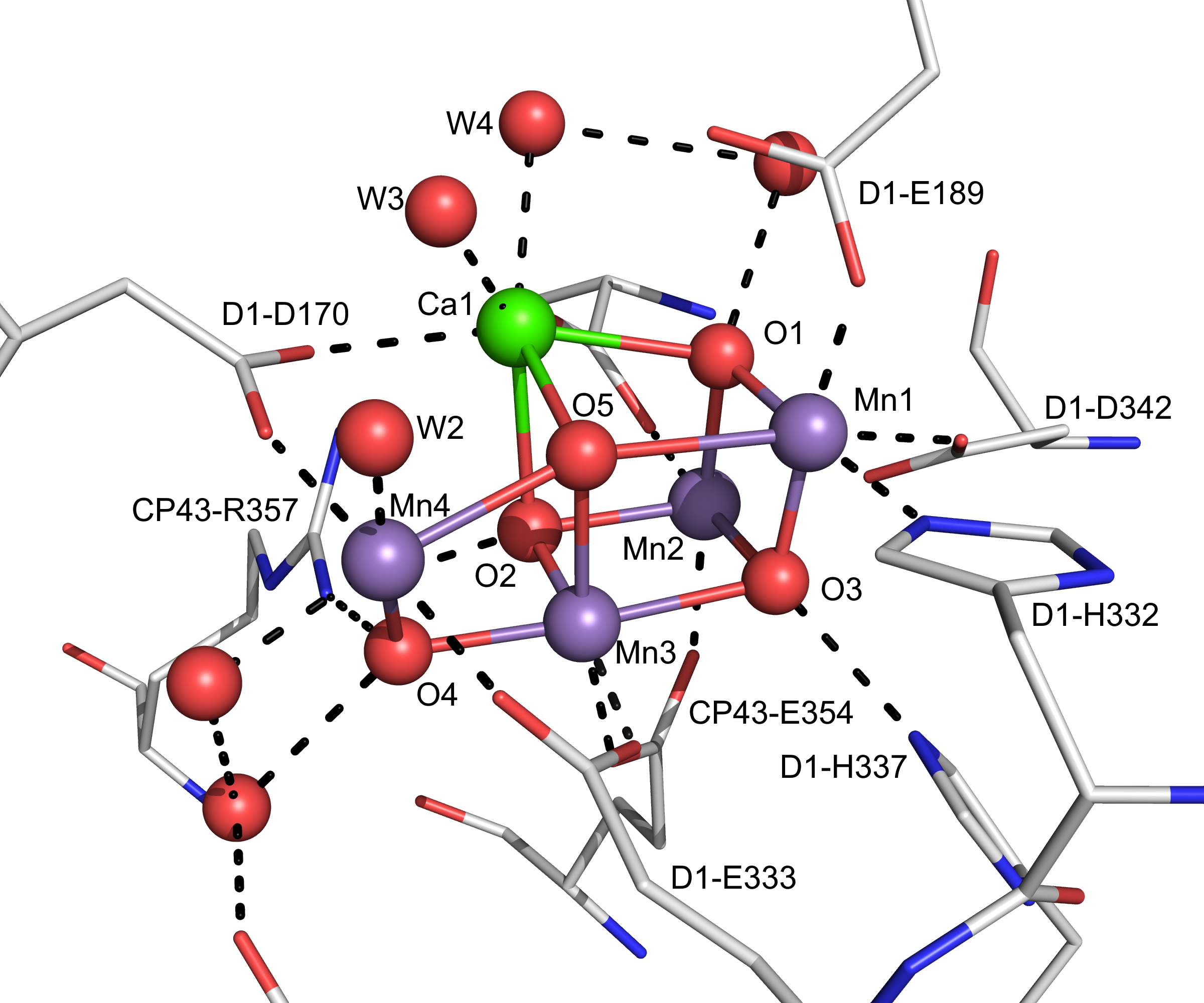
CaMn_{3}O_{4} cubane in Photosystem II.

Octaazacubane is a hypothetical allotrope of nitrogen with formula N_{8}; the nitrogen atoms are the corners of the cube. Like the carbon-based cubane compounds, octaazacubane is predicted to be highly unstable due to angle strain at the corners, and it also does not enjoy the kinetic stability seen for its organic analogues.
