= Selenium dichloride =

Identifiers
CAS Number	14457-70-6
3D model (JSmol)	Interactive image
ChemSpider	123257
PubChem CID	139762
UNII	PDE7WQS0XY
CompTox Dashboard (EPA)	DTXSID80162756
- InChI: InChI=1S/Cl2Se/c1-3-2 Key: SWAKCLHCWHYEOW-UHFFFAOYSA-N
- SMILES: Cl[Se]Cl

Properties
Chemical formula	Cl_{2}Se
Molar mass	149.87 g·mol^{−1}

Related compounds
Other anions	Selenium dibromide, SeBr_{2}
Other cations	Sulfur dichloride, SCl_{2} Tellurium dichloride, TeCl_{2} Polonium dichloride, PoCl_{2}
Related compounds	Selenium tetrachloride, SeCl_{4}
- Except where otherwise noted, data are given for materials in their standard state (at 25 °C [77 °F], 100 kPa). Infobox references

Selenium dichloride is the inorganic compound with the formula SeCl_{2}. It forms red-brown solutions in ethers. Selenium dichloride has been prepared by treating gray selenium with sulfuryl chloride. Adducts of selenium dichloride with thioethers and thioureas are well characterized. Related complexes of tellurium dichloride are known.

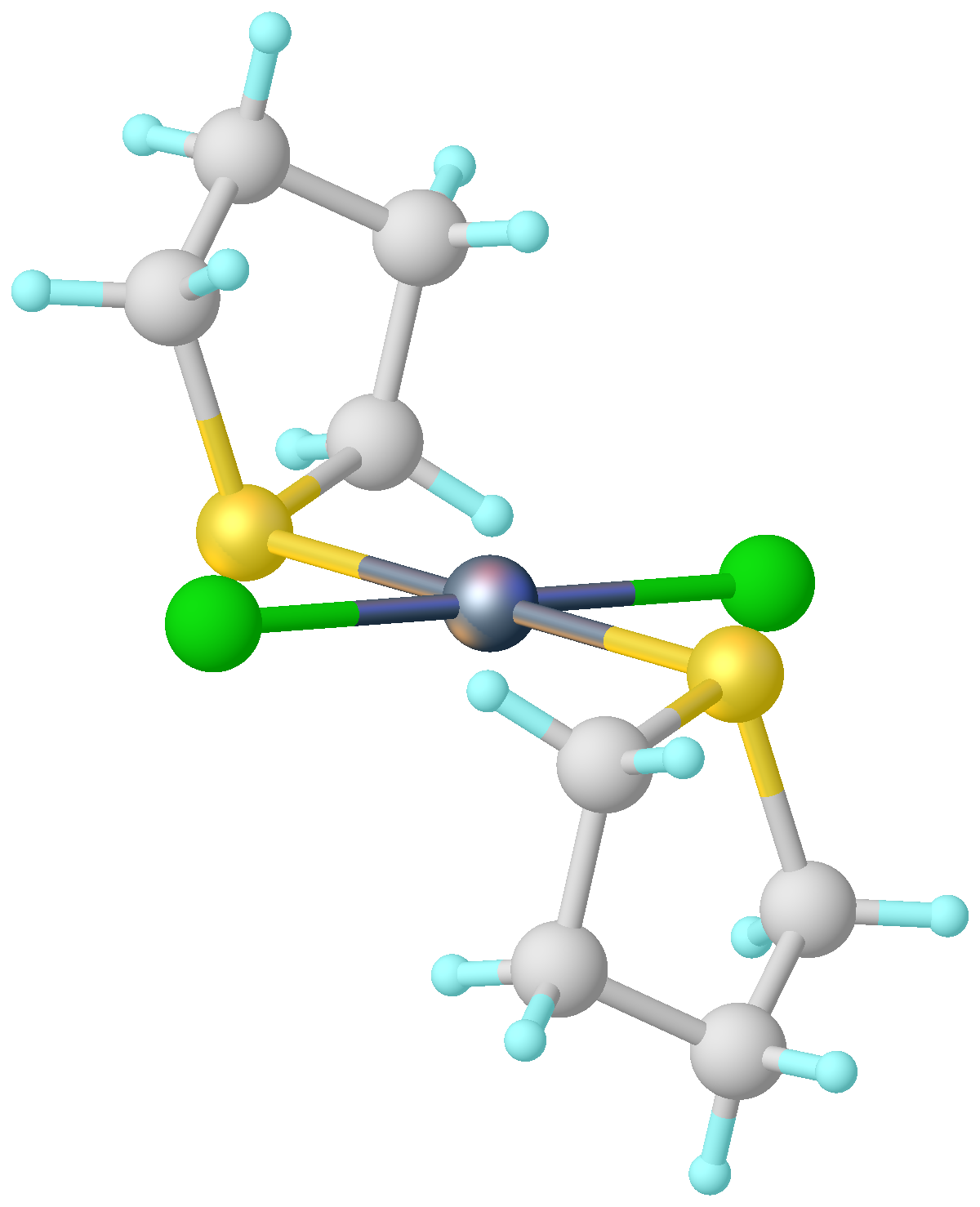
Structure of SeCl_{2}(tetrahydrothiophene)_{2}.

Solutions of selenium dichloride are unstable at room temperature, forming selenium monochloride after several minutes at room temperature:

3 SeCl_{2} → Se_{2}Cl_{2} + SeCl_{4}
