= Selenium tetrachloride =

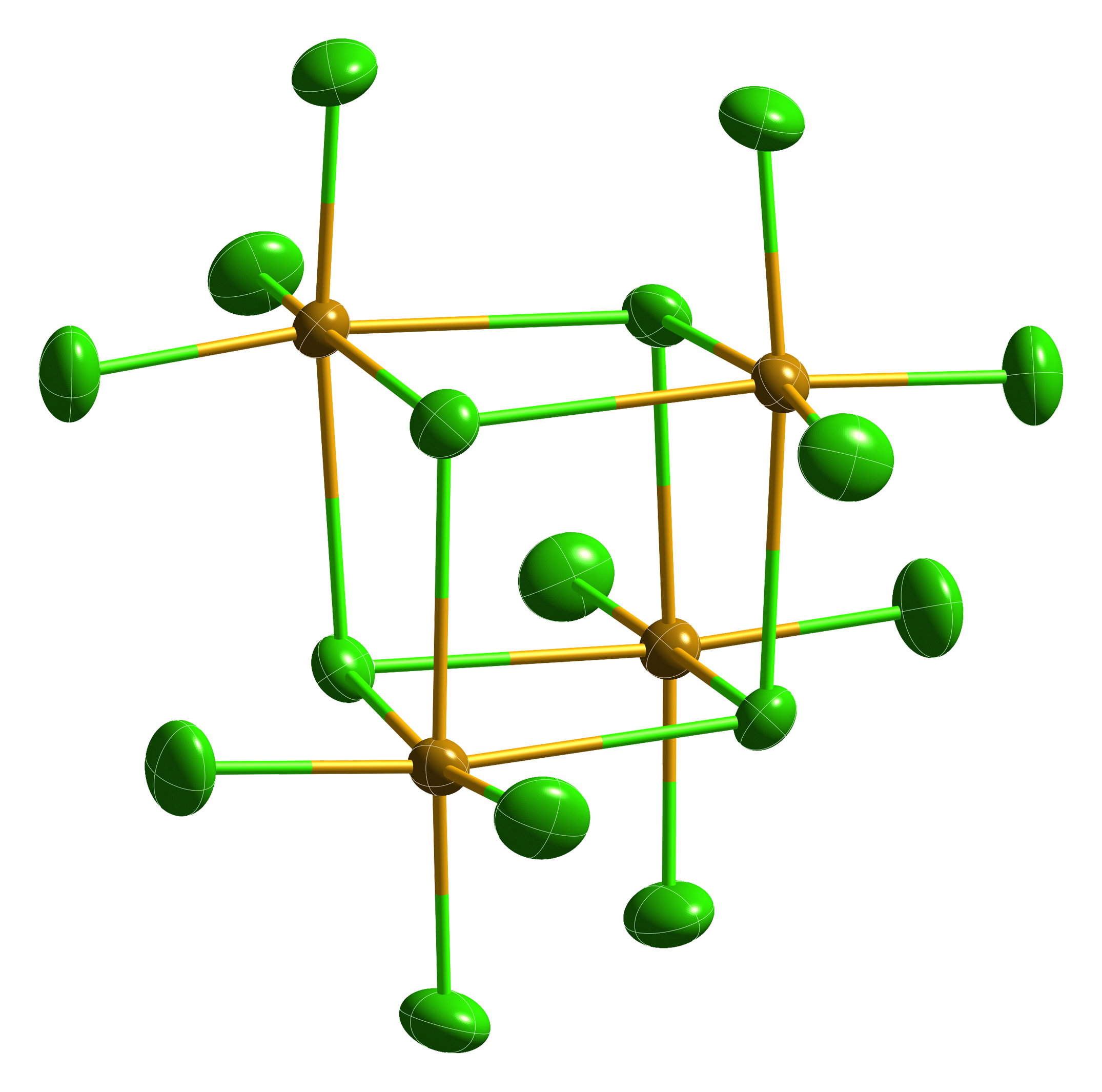

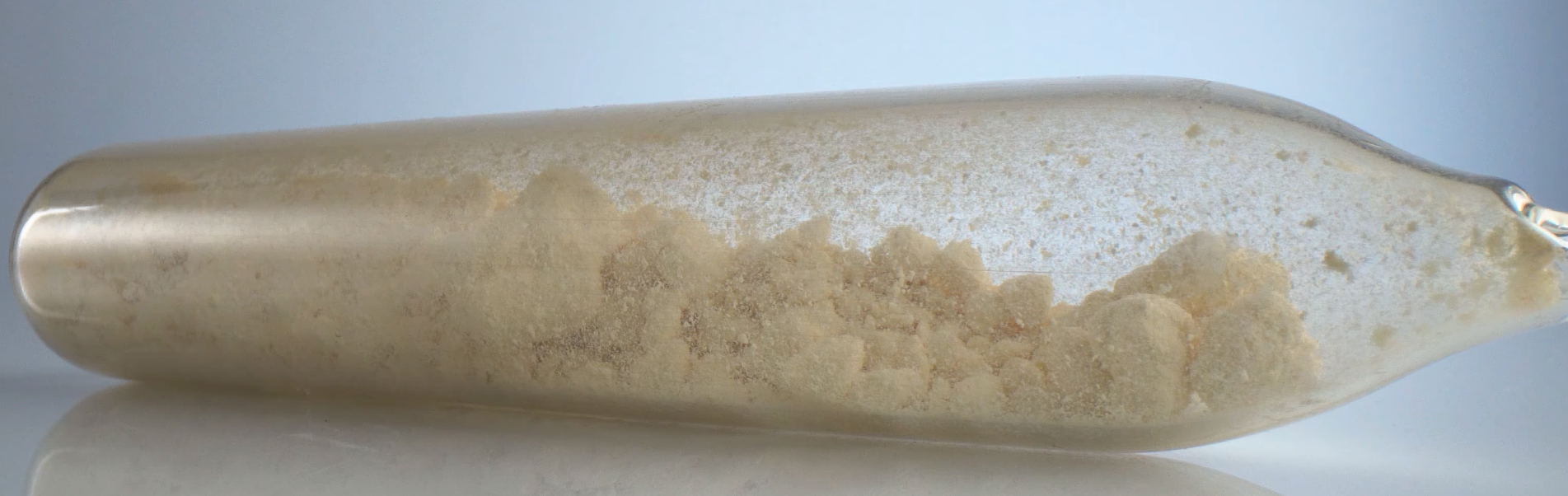

Names
- IUPAC name Selenium tetrachloride
- Other names Selenium(IV) chloride, tetrachloro-λ^{4}-selane

Identifiers
| CAS Number | 10026-03-6 |
| 3D model (JSmol) | Interactive image |
| ChemSpider | 59590 |
| ECHA InfoCard | 100.030.036 |
| EC Number | 233-053-5 |
| PubChem CID | 66205 |
| RTECS number | VS7875000 |
| UNII | 4GB8868P5J |
| CompTox Dashboard (EPA) | DTXSID6064903 |
- InChI: InChI=1S/Cl4Se/c1-5(2,3)4 Key: LNBXMNQCXXEHFT-UHFFFAOYSA-N; InChI=1/Cl4Se/c1-5(2,3)4 Key: LNBXMNQCXXEHFT-UHFFFAOYAD
- SMILES: Cl[Se](Cl)(Cl)Cl

Properties
| Chemical formula | SeCl_{4} |
| Molar mass | 220.771 g/mol |
| Appearance | white to yellow crystals |
| Density | 2.6 g/cm^{3}, solid |
| Melting point | sublimes at 191.4 °C |
| Solubility in water | decomposes in water |

Structure
| Crystal structure | Monoclinic, mS80 |
| Space group | C12/c1, No. 15 |
| Molecular shape | Seesaw (gas phase) |

Hazards
- GHS labelling
| Pictograms | (GHS06: Toxic) (GHS08: Health hazard) (GHS09: Environmental hazard) |
| Signal word | Danger |
| Hazard statements | H301, H331, H373, H410 |
| Precautionary statements | P260, P264, P270, P271, P273, P301+P310, P304+P340, P311, P314, P321, P330, P391, P403+P233, P405, P501 |
| NFPA 704 (fire diamond) | 3 0 2 W |
| Flash point | non-flammable |

Related compounds
| Other anions | Selenium tetrafluoride Selenium tetrabromide Selenium dioxide |
| Other cations | Dichlorine monoxide Sulfur tetrachloride Tellurium tetrachloride |
| Related compounds | Selenium dichloride |
- Except where otherwise noted, data are given for materials in their standard state (at 25 °C [77 °F], 100 kPa). verify (what is ?) Infobox references

Selenium tetrachloride is the inorganic compound composed with the formula SeCl_{4}. This compound exists as yellow to white volatile solid. It is one of two commonly available selenium chlorides, the other example being selenium monochloride, Se_{2}Cl_{2}. SeCl_{4} is used in the synthesis of other selenium compounds.

== Synthesis and structure ==
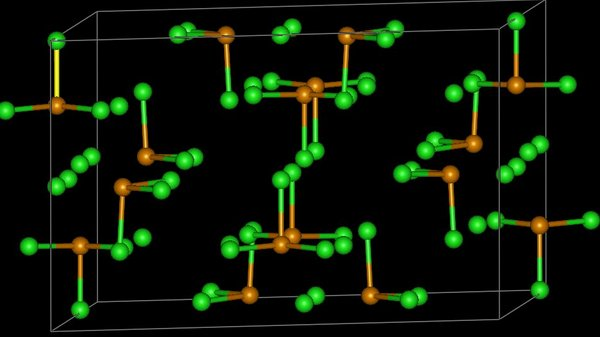
Structure of selenium tetrachloride

The compound is prepared by treating selenium with chlorine. When the reacting selenium is heated, the product sublimes from the reaction flask. The volatility of selenium tetrachloride can be exploited to purification of selenium.

Solid SeCl_{4} is actually a tetrameric cubane-type cluster, for which the Se atom of an SeCl_{6} octahedron sits on four corners of the cube and the bridging Cl atoms sit on the other four corners. The bridging Se-Cl distances are longer than the terminal Se-Cl distances, but all Cl-Se-Cl angles are approximately 90°.

SeCl_{4} has often been used as an example for teaching VSEPR rules of hypervalent molecules. As such, one would predict four bonds but five electron groups giving rise to a seesaw geometry. This clearly is not the case in the crystal structure. Others have suggested that the crystal structure can be represented as SeCl_{3}^{+} and Cl^{−}. This formulation would predict a pyramidal geometry for the SeCl_{3}^{+} cation with a Cl-Se-Cl bond angle of approximately 109°. However, this molecule is an excellent example of a situation where maximal bonding cannot be achieved with the simplest molecular formula. The formation of the tetramer (SeCl_{4})_{4}, with delocalized sigma bonding of the bridging chloride is clearly preferred over a "hypervalent" small molecule. Gaseous SeCl_{4} contains SeCl_{2} and chlorine, which recombine upon condensation.

== Reactions ==
Selenium tetrachloride can be reduced in situ to the dichloride using triphenylstibine:

SeCl_{4} + SbPh_{3} → SeCl_{2} + Cl_{2}SbPh_{3}

Selenium tetrachloride reacts with water to give selenous and hydrochloric acids:

SeCl_{4} + 3 H_{2}O → H_{2}SeO_{3} + 4 HCl

Upon treatment with selenium dioxide, it gives selenium oxychloride:

SeCl_{4} + SeO_{2} → 2SeOCl_{2}
