= Tellurium tetrachloride =

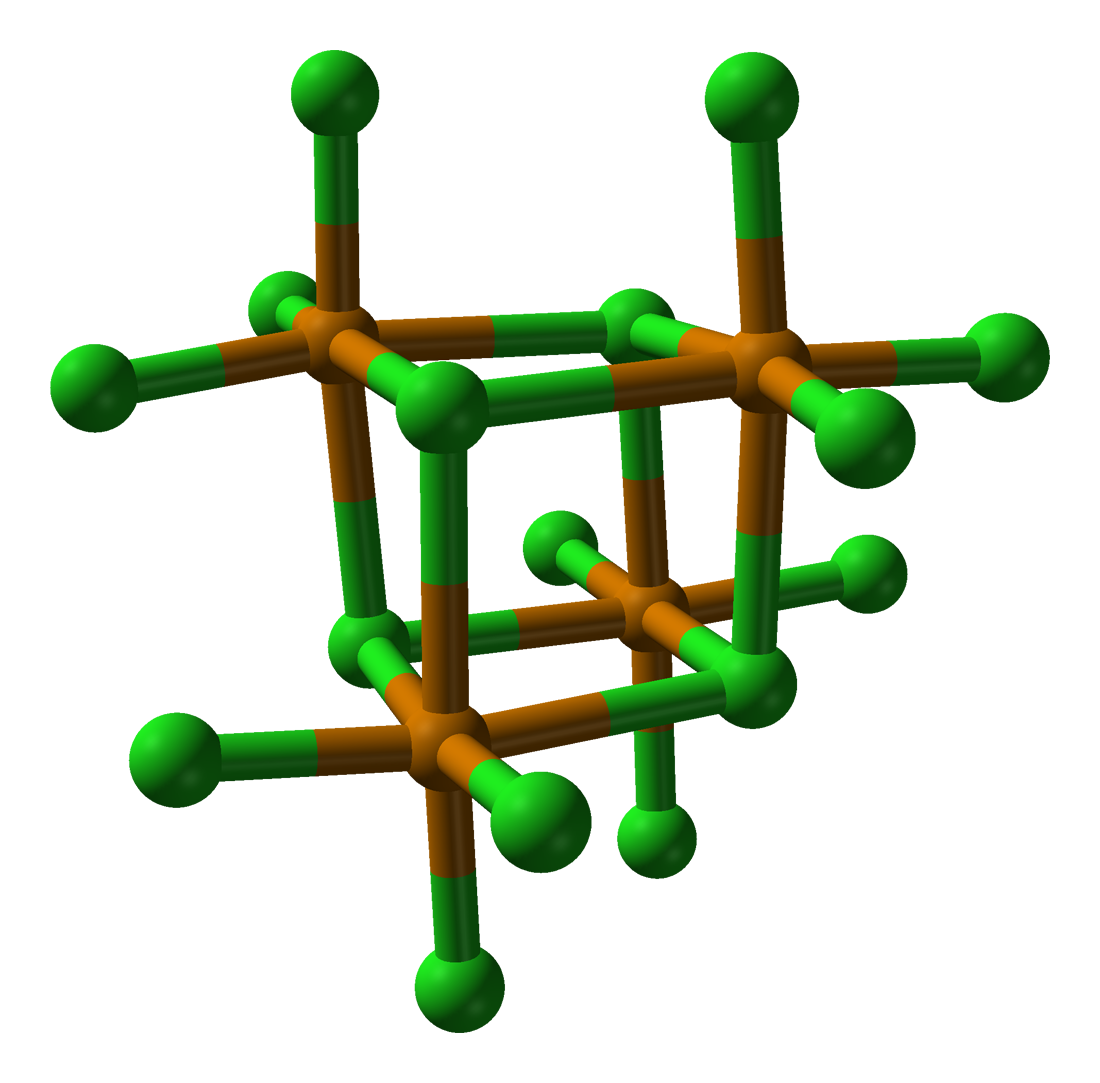
- Tellurium tetrachloride

Names
- IUPAC names Tellurium(IV) chloride Tetratellurium hexadecachloride
- Other names Tellurium chloride

Identifiers
CAS Number	10026-07-0
3D model (JSmol)	monomer: Interactive image; tetramer: Interactive image
ChemSpider	55367
ECHA InfoCard	100.030.038
PubChem CID	61443
UNII	DNY2R5498H
CompTox Dashboard (EPA)	DTXSID1064904
- InChI: InChI=1S/Cl4Te/c1-5(2,3)4 Key: SWLJJEFSPJCUBD-UHFFFAOYSA-N; InChI=1/Cl4Te/c1-5(2,3)4 Key: SWLJJEFSPJCUBD-UHFFFAOYAL
- SMILES: monomer: Cl[Te](Cl)(Cl)Cl; tetramer: [Cl+2]12[Te-2](Cl)(Cl)(Cl)3[Cl+2]4[Te-2](Cl)(Cl)(Cl)1[Cl+2]5[Te-2](Cl)(Cl)(Cl)2[Cl+2]3[Te-2]45(Cl)(Cl)(Cl)

Properties
Chemical formula	TeCl_{4}
Molar mass	269.41 g/mol
Appearance	hygroscopic pale yellow solid (if fused, maroon liquid)
Density	3.26 g/cm^{3}, solid
Melting point	224 °C (435 °F; 497 K)
Boiling point	380 °C (716 °F; 653 K)
Solubility	hot sulfur chloride

Structure
Crystal structure	Monoclinic, mS80
Space group	C12/c1, No. 15
Coordination geometry	Distorted octahedral (Te)
Molecular shape	Seesaw (gas phase)
Dipole moment	2.59 D (gas phase)

Hazards
- Occupational safety and health (OHS/OSH)
Main hazards	Toxic, corrosive, respiratory irritant

Related compounds
Other anions	Tellurium tetrafluoride Tellurium tetrabromide Tellurium tetraiodide
Other cations	Selenium tetrachloride Polonium tetrachloride
Related compounds	Tellurium dichloride
- Except where otherwise noted, data are given for materials in their standard state (at 25 °C [77 °F], 100 kPa). verify (what is ?) Infobox references

Tellurium tetrachloride is the inorganic compound with the empirical formula TeCl_{4}. The compound is volatile, subliming at 200 °C at 0.1 mmHg. Molten TeCl_{4} is ionic, dissociating into TeCl_{3}^{+} and Te_{2}Cl_{10}^{2−}.

== Structure ==
TeCl_{4} is monomeric in the gas phase, with a structure similar to that of SF_{4}. In the solid state, it is a tetrameric cubane-type cluster, consisting of a Te_{4}Cl_{4} core and three terminal chloride ligands for each Te. Alternatively, this tetrameric structure can be considered as a Te_{4} tetrahedron with face-capping chlorines and three terminal chlorines per tellurium atom, giving each tellurium atom a distorted octahedral environment

== Synthesis ==
TeCl_{4} is prepared by chlorination of tellurium powder:

Te + 2 Cl_{2} → TeCl_{4}

The reaction is initiated with heat. The product is isolated by distillation. Crude TeCl_{4} can be purified by distillation under an atmosphere of chlorine.

Alternatively TeCl_{4} can be prepared using sulfuryl chloride (SO_{2}Cl_{2}) as a chlorine source. Yet another method involves the reaction of tellurium with sulfur monochloride (S_{2}Cl_{2}) at room temperature. This exothermic reaction rapidly forms white needle-like crystals of TeCl_{4}.

== Reactions ==
Tellurium tetrachloride is the gateway compound for high valent organotellurium compounds. Arylation gives, depending on conditions, Te(C_{6}H_{4}R)_{2}Cl_{2}, [Te(C_{6}H_{4}R)_{5}]^{−}, [Te(C_{6}H_{4}R)_{6}]^{2−}.

TeCl_{4} has few applications in organic synthesis. Its equivalent weight is high, and the toxicity of organotellurium compounds is problematic. Possible applications of tellurium tetrachloride to organic synthesis have been reported. It adds to alkenes to give Cl-C-C-TeCl_{3} derivatives, wherein the Te can be subsequently removed with sodium sulfide. Electron-rich arenes react to give aryl Te compounds. Thus, anisole gives TeCl_{2}(C_{6}H_{4}OMe)_{2}, which can be reduced to the diaryl telluride. TeCl_{4} is a precursor to tellurium-containing heterocycles like tellurophenes.

Heating a mixture of TeCl_{4} and metallic tellurium gives tellurium dichloride (TeCl_{2}).

In moist air, TeCl_{4} forms tellurium oxychloride (TeOCl_{2}), which further decomposes with excess water to form tellurous acid (H_{2}TeO_{3}).

== Safety considerations ==
As is the case for other tellurium compounds, TeCl_{4} is toxic. It also releases HCl upon hydrolysis.
