= Tellurium tetraiodide =

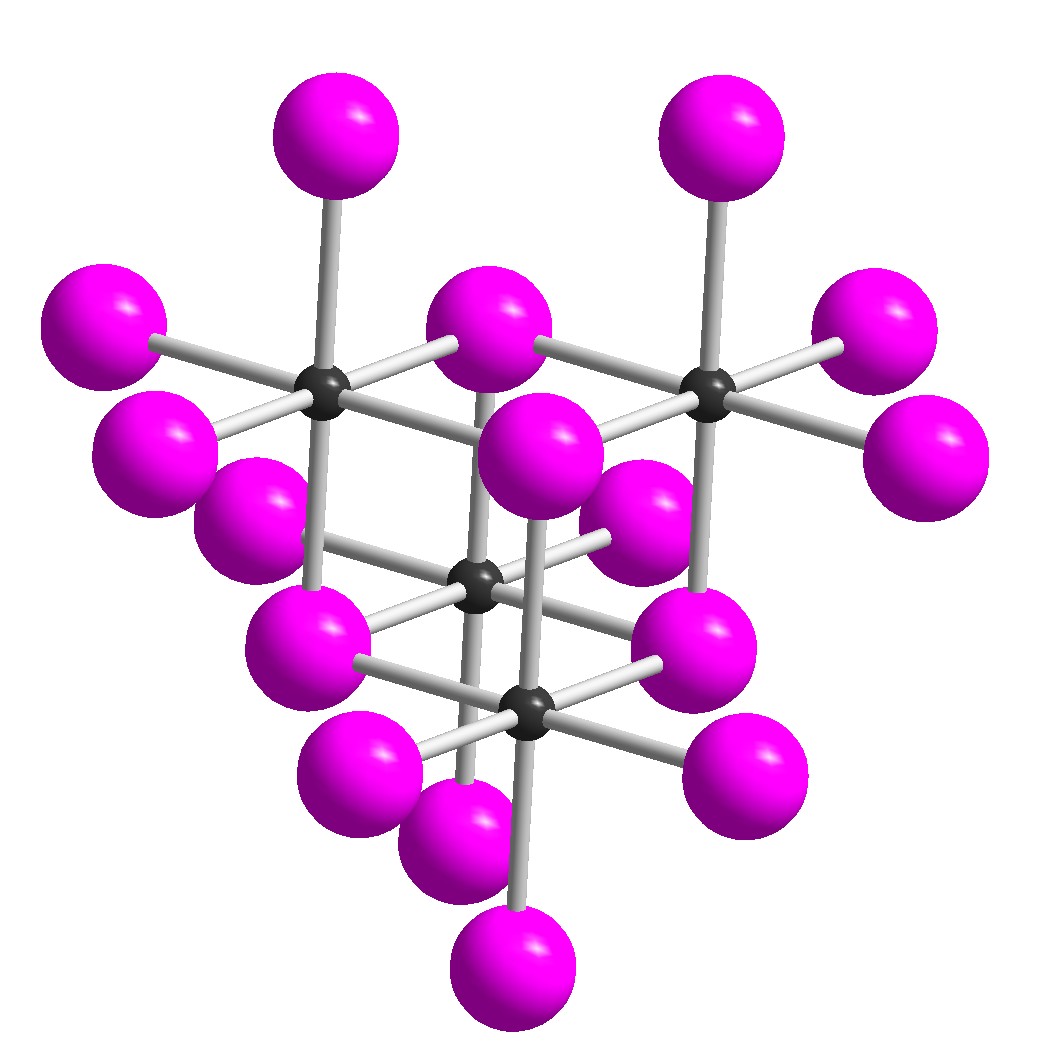

Names
- Other names tellurium(IV) iodide

Identifiers
CAS Number	7790-48-9
3D model (JSmol)	Interactive image
ChemSpider	74232
ECHA InfoCard	100.029.282
EC Number	232-210-5
PubChem CID	82255
UNII	ZB48I033V5
CompTox Dashboard (EPA)	DTXSID1064877
- InChI: InChI=1S/I4Te/c1-5(2,3)4 Key: XCOKHDCPVWVFKS-UHFFFAOYSA-N
- SMILES: [Te](I)(I)(I)I

Properties
Chemical formula	TeI_{4}
Molar mass	635.218 g/mol
Appearance	black crystals
Density	5.05 g/cm^{3}, solid
Melting point	280 °C (536 °F; 553 K)

Structure
Crystal structure	orthorhombic

Hazards
- GHS labelling
Pictograms	(GHS05: Corrosive) (GHS07: Exclamation mark)
Signal word	Danger
Hazard statements	H302, H312, H314, H332
Precautionary statements	P260, P264, P270, P271, P280, P301+P312, P301+P330+P331, P302+P352, P303+P361+P353, P304+P312, P304+P340, P305+P351+P338, P310, P312, P322, P330, P363, P405, P501
- Except where otherwise noted, data are given for materials in their standard state (at 25 °C [77 °F], 100 kPa). verify (what is ?) Infobox references

Tellurium tetraiodide (TeI_{4}) is an inorganic chemical compound. It has a tetrameric structure which is different from the tetrameric solid forms of TeCl_{4} and TeBr_{4}. In TeI_{4} the Te atoms are octahedrally coordinated and edges of the octahedra are shared.

== Preparation ==
Tellurium tetraiodide can be prepared by reacting Te and iodomethane, CH_{3}I. In the vapour TeI_{4} dissociates:

TeI_{4} → TeI_{2} + I_{2}

It can be also obtained by reacting telluric acid with hydrogen iodide.

Te(OH)_{6} + HI → TeI_{4} + I_{2} + 6 H_{2}O

It can also be obtained by reacting the elements, which can also produce tellurium diiodide and tellurium monoiodide, depending on the reaction conditions:

Te + 2 I_{2} → TeI_{4}

TeI_{4} → TeI_{2} + I_{2}

== Properties ==
Tellurium tetraiodide is an iron-gray solid that decomposes slowly in cold water and quickly in warm water to form tellurium dioxide and hydrogen iodide. It is stable even in moist air and decomposes when heated, releasing iodine. It is soluble in hydriodic acid to form H[TeI_{5}] and it is slightly soluble in acetone.

Tellurium tetraiodide is a conductor when molten, dissociating into the ions TeI_{3}^{+} and I^{−}. In solvents with donor properties such as acetonitrile, CH_{3}CN ionic complexes are formed which make the solution conducting:

TeI_{4} + 2 CH_{3}CN → (CH_{3}CN)_{2}TeI_{3}^{+} + I^{−}

Five modifications of tellurium tetraiodide are known, all of which are composed of tetrameric molecules. The δ form is the most thermodynamically stable form. This is structurally derived (as well as the α, β and γ forms) from the ε form.
