= Selenium tetrafluoride =

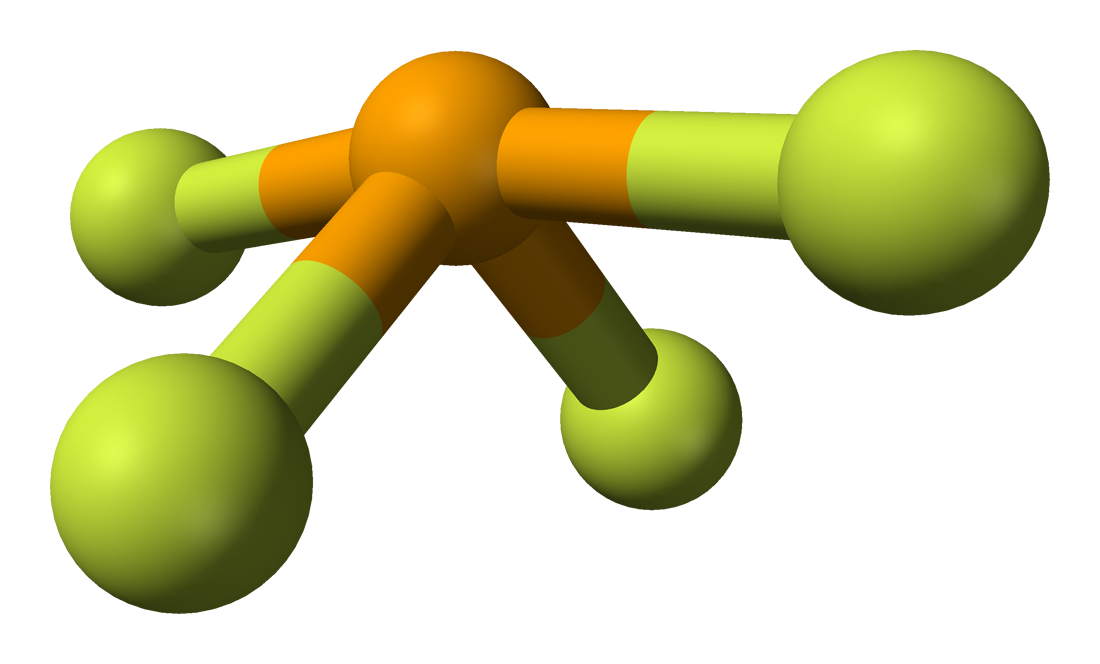

Identifiers
CAS Number	13465-66-2
3D model (JSmol)	Interactive image
ChEBI	CHEBI:30435
ChemSpider	109914
ECHA InfoCard	100.033.352
PubChem CID	123311
UNII	73U0ARO564
CompTox Dashboard (EPA)	DTXSID50158848
- InChI: InChI=1S/F4Se/c1-5(2,3)4 Key: PMOBWAXBGUSOPS-UHFFFAOYSA-N; InChI=1/F4Se/c1-5(2,3)4 Key: PMOBWAXBGUSOPS-UHFFFAOYAQ
- SMILES: F[Se](F)(F)F

Properties
Chemical formula	SeF_{4}
Molar mass	154.954 g/mol
Appearance	colourless liquid
Density	2.77 g/cm^{3}
Melting point	−13.2 °C (8.2 °F; 259.9 K)
Boiling point	101 °C (214 °F; 374 K)

Hazards
NFPA 704 (fire diamond)	3 0 2 W

Related compounds
Other anions	selenium dioxide, selenium(IV) chloride, selenium(IV) bromide
Other cations	sulfur tetrafluoride, tellurium(IV) fluoride
Related compounds	selenium difluoride, selenium hexafluoride
- Except where otherwise noted, data are given for materials in their standard state (at 25 °C [77 °F], 100 kPa). verify (what is ?) Infobox references

Selenium tetrafluoride (SeF_{4}) is an inorganic compound. It is a colourless liquid that reacts readily with water. It can be used as a fluorinating reagent in organic syntheses (fluorination of alcohols, carboxylic acids or carbonyl compounds) and has advantages over sulfur tetrafluoride in that milder conditions can be employed and it is a liquid rather than a gas.

== Synthesis ==
The first reported synthesis of selenium tetrafluoride was by Paul Lebeau in 1907, who treated selenium with fluorine:

Se + 2 F_{2} → SeF_{4}

A synthesis involving more easily handled reagents entails the fluorination of selenium dioxide with sulfur tetrafluoride:

SF_{4} + SeO_{2} → SeF_{4} + SO_{2}

An intermediate in this reaction is seleninyl fluoride (SeOF_{2}).

Other methods of preparation include fluorinating elemental selenium with chlorine trifluoride:

3 Se + 4 ClF_{3} → 3 SeF_{4} + 2 Cl_{2}

== Structure and bonding ==
Selenium in SeF_{4} has an oxidation state of +4. Its shape in the gaseous phase is similar to that of SF_{4}, having a see-saw shape. VSEPR theory predicts a pseudo-trigonal pyramidal disposition of the five electron pairs around the selenium atom. The axial Se-F bonds are 177 pm with an F-Se-F bond angle of 169.2°. The two other fluorine atoms are attached by shorter bonds (168 pm), with an F-Se-F bond angle of 100.6°. In solution at low concentrations this monomeric structure predominates, but at higher concentrations evidence suggests weak association between SeF_{4} molecules leading to a distorted octahedral coordination around the selenium atom. In the solid the selenium center also has a distorted octahedral environment.

== Reactions ==
In HF, SeF_{4} behaves as a weak base, weaker than sulfur tetrafluoride, SF_{4} (K_{b}= 2 X 10^{−2}):

SeF_{4} + HF → SeF_{3}^{+} + HF_{2}^{−}; (K_{b} = 4 X 10^{−4})

Ionic adducts containing the SeF_{3}^{+} cation are formed with SbF_{5}, AsF_{5}, NbF_{5}, TaF_{5}, and BF_{3}. With caesium fluoride, CsF, the SeF_{5}^{−} anion is formed, which has a square pyramidal structure similar to the isoelectronic chlorine pentafluoride, ClF_{5} and bromine pentafluoride, BrF_{5}. With 1,1,3,3,5,5-hexamethylpiperidinium fluoride or 1,2-dimethylpropyltrimethylammonium fluoride, the SeF_{6}^{2−} anion is formed. This has a distorted octahedral shape which contrasts to the regular octahedral shape of the analogous SeCl_{6}^{2−}.

== See also ==
- Selenium hexafluoride
- Sulfur tetrafluoride
- Tellurium tetrafluoride
