= Ditellurium decafluoride =

Ditellurium decafluoride was widely reported in the literature but what was believed to be Te_{2}F_{10} has been shown to be teflic anhydride, F_{5}TeOTeF_{5}. An account as to how this error occurred was made by P. M. Watkins.

If it existed, it would be valence isoelectronic with disulfur decafluoride, and have a similar structure.
