= Ditellurium bromide =

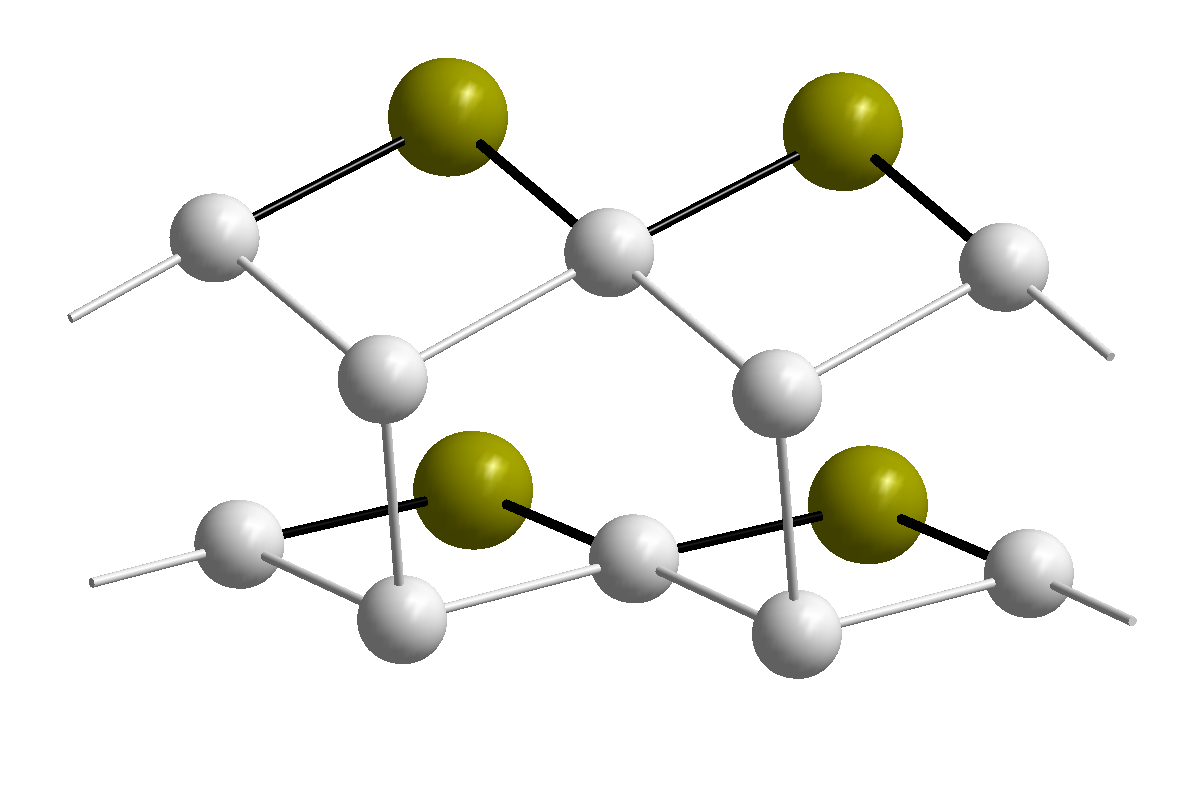

Identifiers
CAS Number	12514-37-3
3D model (JSmol)	Interactive image
PubChem CID	163195843
CompTox Dashboard (EPA)	DTXSID801312131
- InChI: InChI=1S/Br.2Te Key: YFIRGYCOHWGSSA-UHFFFAOYSA-N
- SMILES: [Te].[Te].[Br]

Properties
Chemical formula	Te_{2}Br
Molar mass	335.10 g·mol^{−1}
Appearance	Gray crystalline solid
Melting point	224 °C

Related compounds
Other anions	tritellurium dichloride
Other cations	selenium dibromide
Related compounds	tellurium tetrabromide
- Except where otherwise noted, data are given for materials in their standard state (at 25 °C [77 °F], 100 kPa). (what is ?) Infobox references

Ditellurium bromide is the inorganic compound with the formula Te_{2}Br. It is one of the few stable lower bromides of tellurium. Unlike sulfur and selenium, tellurium forms families of polymeric subhalides where the halide/chalcogen ratio is less than 2.

== Preparation and properties ==
Te_{2}Br is a gray solid. Its structure consists of a chain of Te atoms with Br occupying a doubly bridged site. It is prepared by heating tellurium with the appropriate stoichiometry of bromine near 215 °C, or reduction at room temperature of tellurium tetrabromide with tellurium metal in a tetrachloroaluminate ionic liquid. The corresponding chloride and iodide, Te_{2}Cl and Te_{2}I, are also known.

Other tellurium bromides include the yellow liquid Te_{2}Br_{2}, the orange solid TeBr_{4}, and the greenish-black solid TeBr_{2}. Complexes of the type TeBr_{2}(thiourea)_{2} are well characterized.
