= Selenium monochloride =

Diselenium dichloride
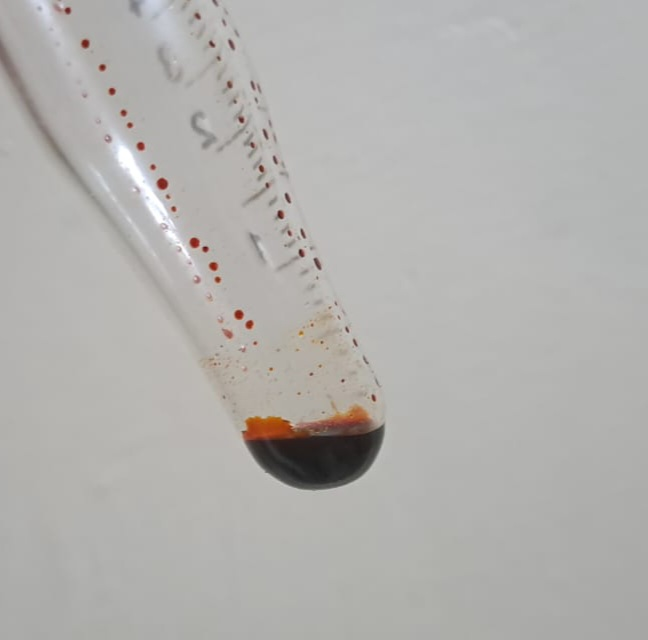

Names
- IUPAC name Diselenium dichloride
- Other names: 1,2-Dichlorodiselane; Dichlorodiselane; Dichlorodiselenide; Selenium chloride; Selenium monochloride

Identifiers
CAS Number	10025-68-0
3D model (JSmol)	Interactive image
ChemSpider	59591
ECHA InfoCard	100.030.022
EC Number	233-037-8
PubChem CID	66206
UNII	2A5292FC4P
CompTox Dashboard (EPA)	DTXSID1064902
- InChI: InChI=1S/Cl2Se2/c1-3-4-2 Key: VIEXQFHKRAHTQS-UHFFFAOYSA-N; InChI=1/Cl2Se2/c1-3-4-2 Key: VIEXQFHKRAHTQS-UHFFFAOYAC
- SMILES: Cl[Se][Se]Cl

Properties
Chemical formula	Se_{2}Cl_{2}
Molar mass	228.84 g·mol^{−1}
Appearance	Reddish-brown oily liquid
Density	2.7741 g/cm^{3}
Melting point	−85 °C (−121 °F; 188 K)
Boiling point	127 °C (261 °F; 400 K) at 0.997 atm
Solubility in water	insoluble, hydrolyses
Solubility in other solvents	Soluble in chloroform, carbon disulfide, and acetonitrile
Magnetic susceptibility (χ)	−94.8·10^{−6} cm^{3}/mol

Hazards
- GHS labelling
Pictograms	(GHS05: Corrosive) (GHS06: Toxic) (GHS08: Health hazard) (GHS09: Environmental hazard)
Signal word	Danger
Hazard statements	H301, H311, H314, H331, H373, H410
Precautionary statements	P260, P264, P270, P271, P273, P280, P301+P310, P301+P330+P331, P302+P352, P303+P361+P353, P304+P340, P305+P351+P338, P310, P311, P312, P314, P321, P322, P330, P361, P363, P391, P403+P233, P405, P501
- Except where otherwise noted, data are given for materials in their standard state (at 25 °C [77 °F], 100 kPa). verify (what is ?) Infobox references

Selenium monochloride or diselenium dichloride is an inorganic compound with the formula Se_{2}Cl_{2}. Although a common name for the compound is selenium monochloride, reflecting its empirical formula, IUPAC does not recommend that name, instead preferring the more descriptive diselenium dichloride.

Diselenium dichloride is a reddish-brown, oily liquid that hydrolyses slowly. It exists in chemical equilibrium with SeCl_{2}, SeCl_{4}, chlorine, and elemental selenium. Diselenium dichloride is mainly used as a reagent for the synthesis of Se-containing compounds.

== Structure and properties ==
Dielenium dichloride has the connectivity Cl−Se−Se−Cl. With a nonplanar structure, it has C_{2} molecular symmetry, similar to hydrogen peroxide and disulfur dichloride, which is referred to as gauche. The Se-Se bond length is 223 pm, and the Se-Cl bond lengths are 220 pm. The angle Se – Se – Cl is 104° and the dihedral angle between the Cl^{a}−Se−Se and Se−Se−Cl^{b} planes is 87°.

== Preparation ==
Early routes to diselenium dichloride involved chlorination of elemental selenium. An improved method involves the reaction of a mixture of selenium, selenium dioxide, and hydrochloric acid:

3 Se + SeO_{2} + 4 HCl → 2 Se_{2}Cl_{2} + 2 H_{2}O

A dense layer of diselenium dichloride settles from the reaction mixture, which can be purified by dissolving it in fuming sulfuric acid and reprecipitating it with hydrochloric acid. A second method for the synthesis involves the reaction of selenium with oleum and hydrochloric acid:

2 Se + 2 SO_{3} + 3 HCl → Se_{2}Cl_{2} + SO_{2} + H_{2}O + SO_{2}(OH)Cl

The crude diselenium dichloride is removed via separatory funnel. Diselenium dichloride cannot be distilled without decomposition, even at reduced pressure.

In acetonitrile solutions, it exists in equilibrium with SeCl_{2} and SeCl_{4}. Selenium dichloride degrades to diselenium dichloride after a few minutes at room temperature:

3 SeCl_{2} → Se_{2}Cl_{2} + SeCl_{4}

== Reactions ==
Diselenium dichloride is an electrophilic selenizing agent, and thus it reacts with simple alkenes to give bis(β-chloroalkyl)selenide and bis(chloroalkyl)selenium dichloride. It converts hydrazones of hindered ketones into the corresponding selenoketones, the structural analogs of ketones whereby the oxygen atom is replaced with a selenium atom. Finally, the compound has been used to introduce bridging selenium ligands between the metal atoms of some iron and chromium carbonyl complexes.
