= Tritellurium dichloride =

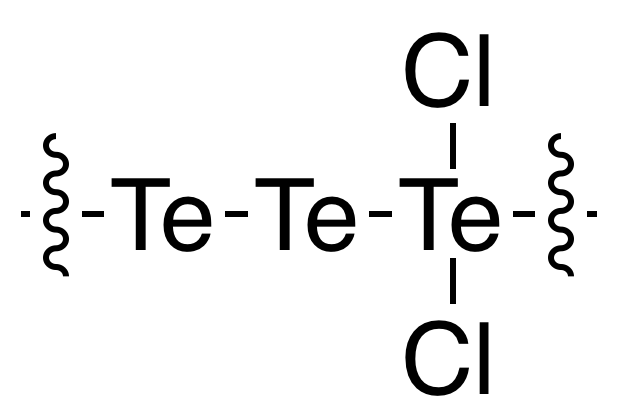

Identifiers
CAS Number	12526-08-8
3D model (JSmol)	Interactive image
- InChI: InChI=1S/Cl2Te3/c1-5(2)4-3 Key: TWWCHESXRMILGP-UHFFFAOYSA-N
- SMILES: Cl[Te](=[Te])(=[Te])Cl

Properties
Chemical formula	Te_{3}Cl_{2}
Molar mass	453.71 g/mol
Appearance	Gray solid
- Except where otherwise noted, data are given for materials in their standard state (at 25 °C [77 °F], 100 kPa). (what is ?) Infobox references

Tritellurium dichloride is the inorganic compound with the formula Te_{3}Cl_{2}. It is one of the more stable lower chlorides of tellurium.

== Preparation and properties ==
Te_{3}Cl_{2} is a gray solid. Its structure consists of a long chain of tellurium (Te) atoms, with every third Te center carrying two chloride ligands for the repeat unit -Te-Te-TeCl_{2}-. It is a semiconductor with a band gap of 1.52 eV, which is larger than that for elemental Te (0.34 eV). It is prepared by heating tellurium with the appropriate stoichiometry of chlorine.
