= Diphenyl sulfide =

Organic compound

Names
- IUPAC name Phenylsulfanylbenzene

Identifiers
CAS Number	139-66-2
3D model (JSmol)	Interactive image
Abbreviations	Ph_{2}S
Beilstein Reference	1907932
ChEBI	CHEBI:38959
ChEMBL	ChEMBL219876
ChemSpider	8436
ECHA InfoCard	100.004.884
EC Number	205-371-4
UNII	B5P3Y93MNR
CompTox Dashboard (EPA)	DTXSID8044383
- InChI: InChI=1S/C12H10S/c1-3-7-11(8-4-1)13-12-9-5-2-6-10-12/h1-10H Key: LTYMSROWYAPPGB-UHFFFAOYSA-N
- SMILES: C1=CC=C(C=C1)SC2=CC=CC=C2

Properties
Chemical formula	C_{12}H_{10}S
Molar mass	186.27 g·mol^{−1}
Appearance	Colorless liquid
Odor	Unpleasant
Density	1.113 g/cm^{3} (20 °C); Vapor: 6.42 (air = 1.0)
Melting point	−25.9 °C (−14.6 °F; 247.2 K)
Boiling point	296 °C (565 °F; 569 K)
Solubility in water	insoluble
Solubility	Soluble in diethyl ether, benzene, carbon disulfide.
Vapor pressure	0.01 hPa at 25 °C
Refractive index (n_{D})	1.6327
Viscosity	Dynamic: 21.45 mPa·s at 20 °C; 18.4 mPa·s at 40 °C; Kinematic: 19.43 mm^{2}/s at 20 °C; 16.7 mm^{2}/s at 40 °C

Structure
Molecular shape	Bent on the sulfur atom

Hazards
- GHS labelling
Pictograms	(GHS07: Exclamation mark) (GHS09: Environmental hazard)
Signal word	Warning
Hazard statements	H302, H315, H319, H410
Precautionary statements	P264, P270, P273, P280, P301+P312, P301+P317, P302+P352, P305+P351+P338, P321, P330, P332+P317, P362+P364, P391, P501
Flash point	113 °C (235 °F)
- Lethal dose or concentration (LD, LC)
LD_{50} (median dose)	300 to 2000 mg/kg (oral, female rat); 5000 mg/kg (dermal, female rat); 11300 μL/kg (dermal, rabbit); 490 μL/kg (oral, rat); 545 mg/kg (oral, rat); 12600 mg/kg (dermal, rabbit)

Related compounds
Related compounds	Diphenyl ether; Diphenyl selenide; Diphenyl telluride; Diphenyl disulfide; Thiophenol; Diphenyl sulfone
- Except where otherwise noted, data are given for materials in their standard state (at 25 °C [77 °F], 100 kPa). Infobox references

Diphenyl sulfide is an organosulfur compound with the chemical formula (C_{6}H_{5})_{2}S, often abbreviated as Ph_{2}S, where Ph stands for phenyl. It is a colorless liquid with an unpleasant odor. Diphenyl sulfide is an aromatic sulfide. The molecule consists of two phenyl groups attached to a sulfur atom.

== Synthesis, reactions, occurrence ==
Many methods exist for the preparation of diphenyl sulfide. It arises by a Friedel-Crafts-like reaction of sulfur monochloride and benzene. Diphenyl sulfide and its analogues can also be produced by coupling reactions using metal catalysts. It can also be prepared by reduction of diphenyl sulfone.

Diphenyl sulfide is a product of the photodegradation of the fungicide edifenphos.

Diphenyl sulfide is a precursor to triarylsulfonium salts, which are used as photoinitiators. The compound can be oxidized to the sulfoxide with hydrogen peroxide.
