= Benzenetellurol =

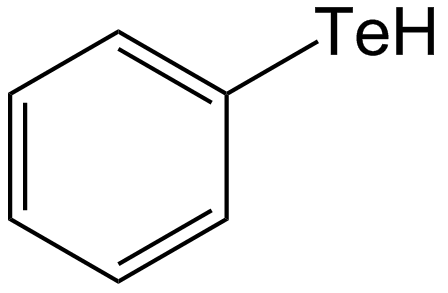

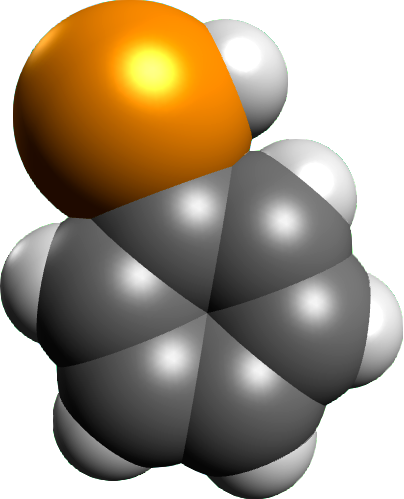

Names
- IUPAC name Benzenetellurol
- Other names Tellurophenol

Identifiers
CAS Number	69577-06-6
3D model (JSmol)	Interactive image
ChemSpider	4414346
PubChem CID	5246059
CompTox Dashboard (EPA)	DTXSID40412946
- InChI: InChI=1S/C6H6Te/c7-6-4-2-1-3-5-6/h1-5,7H Key: NGTSCMPNJJGTPR-UHFFFAOYSA-N
- SMILES: C1=CC=C(C=C1)[TeH]

Properties
Chemical formula	C_{6}H_{6}Te
Molar mass	205.71 g·mol^{−1}
Appearance	Colorless oily liquid
Odor	Unpleasant
Solubility	Soluble in organic solvents

Related compounds
Related compounds	Phenol; Thiophenol; Benzeneselenol
- Except where otherwise noted, data are given for materials in their standard state (at 25 °C [77 °F], 100 kPa). Infobox references

Benzenetellurol is an organotellurium compound with the chemical formula C_{6}H_{6}Te or C_{6}H_{5}TeH, often abbreviated as PhTeH, where Ph stands for phenyl. It is an analog of phenol C_{6}H_{5}OH, where oxygen is replaced by tellurium.

== Synthesis ==
Benzenetellurol can be synthesized by methanolysis of phenyl trimethylsilyl telluride (C_{6}H_{5}TeSi(CH_{3})_{3}) or its reaction with water or reduction of diphenyl ditelluride with phosphinic acid or sodium borohydride.

C_{6}H_{5}TeSi(CH_{3})_{3} + H_{2}O → (CH_{3})_{3}SiOH + C_{6}H_{5}TeH

== Uses ==
Benzenetellurol is unstable in air, so it is used as a reducing agent in situ in organic synthesis, for example, to reduce aromatic nitro compounds to amines.

Benzenetellurol is an effective novel reagent for the reductive conversion of ketones into unsymmetrical ethers under the catalization of ZnI_{2}.

== Related compounds ==
Sodium benzenetellurolate C_{6}H_{5}Te^{−}Na^{+} is isolated as an air- and moisture-sensitive gray powder. It is prepared and stored under nitrogen atmosphere. Its solutions in acetone and THF are stable for months when kept under nitrogen atmosphere.
