= Diphenyl ether =

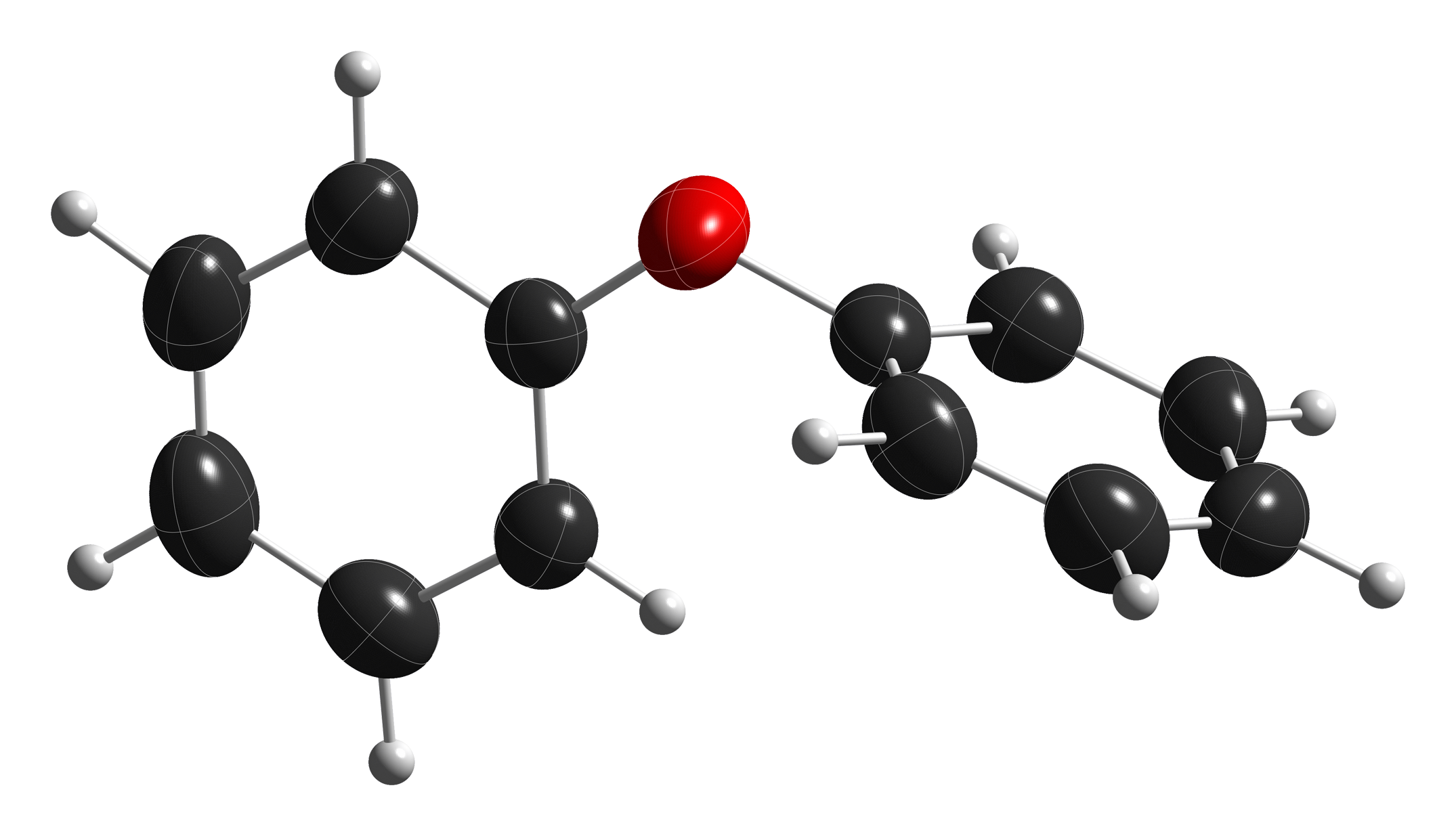

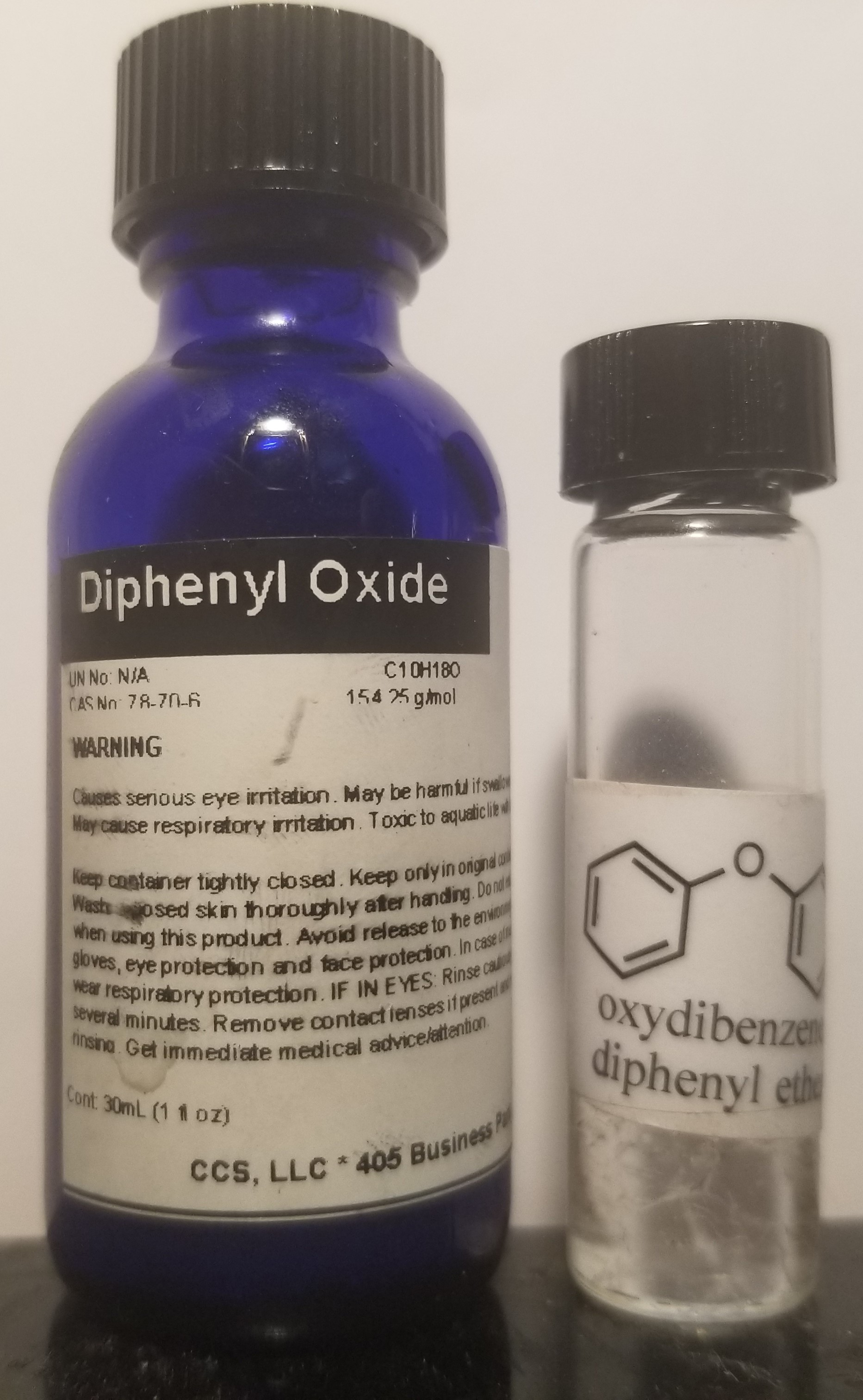

Names
- Preferred IUPAC name 1,1′-Oxydibenzene
- Systematic IUPAC name Phenoxybenzene
- Other names Oxydibenzene; Diphenyl ether Diphenyl oxide 1,1′-Oxybisbenzene; Phenoxybenzene

Identifiers
| CAS Number | 101-84-8 |
| 3D model (JSmol) | Interactive image |
| Abbreviations | Ph_{2}O |
| Beilstein Reference | 1364620 |
| ChEBI | CHEBI:39258 |
| ChEMBL | ChEMBL38934 |
| ChemSpider | 7302 |
| ECHA InfoCard | 100.002.711 |
| EC Number | 202-981-2 |
| Gmelin Reference | 165477 |
| PubChem CID | 7583 |
| RTECS number | KN8970000 |
| UNII | 3O695R5M1U |
| UN number | 3077 |
| CompTox Dashboard (EPA) | DTXSID9021847 |
- InChI: InChI=1S/C12H10O/c1-3-7-11(8-4-1)13-12-9-5-2-6-10-12/h1-10H Key: USIUVYZYUHIAEV-UHFFFAOYSA-N; InChI=1/C12H10O/c1-3-7-11(8-4-1)13-12-9-5-2-6-10-12/h1-10H Key: USIUVYZYUHIAEV-UHFFFAOYAV
- SMILES: O(c1ccccc1)c2ccccc2

Properties
| Chemical formula | C_{12}H_{10}O |
| Molar mass | 170.211 g·mol^{−1} |
| Appearance | Colorless solid or liquid |
| Odor | geranium-like |
| Density | 1.08 g/cm^{3} (20 °C) |
| Melting point | 25 to 26 °C (77 to 79 °F; 298 to 299 K) |
| Boiling point | 258.55 °C (497.39 °F; 531.70 K) at 100 kPa (1 bar), 121 °C at 1.34 kPa (10.05 mm Hg) |
| Solubility in water | Insoluble |
| Vapor pressure | 0.02 mmHg (25 °C) |
| Magnetic susceptibility (χ) | −108.1·10^{−6} cm^{3}/mol |

Hazards
- GHS labelling
| Pictograms | (GHS07: Exclamation mark) (GHS08: Health hazard) (GHS09: Environmental hazard) |
| Signal word | Danger |
| Hazard statements | H317, H319, H360Fd, H400, H411 |
| Precautionary statements | P264, P273, P280, P305+P351+P338, P337+P313, P391, P501 |
| NFPA 704 (fire diamond) | 2 1 |
| Flash point | 115 °C (239 °F; 388 K) |
| Explosive limits | 0.7%–6.0% |
- Lethal dose or concentration (LD, LC)
| LD_{50} (median dose) | 3370 mg/kg (rat, oral); 4000 mg/kg (rat, oral); 4000 mg/kg (guinea pig, oral) |
- NIOSH (US health exposure limits)
| PEL (Permissible) | TWA 1 ppm (7 mg/m^{3}) |
| REL (Recommended) | TWA 1 ppm (7 mg/m^{3}) |
| IDLH (Immediate danger) | 100 ppm |
| Safety data sheet (SDS) | Aldrich MSDS |

Related compounds
| Related compounds | Diphenyl sulfide; Diphenyl selenide; Diphenyl telluride |
- Except where otherwise noted, data are given for materials in their standard state (at 25 °C [77 °F], 100 kPa). verify (what is ?) Infobox references

Diphenyl ether is the organic compound with the formula (C_{6}H_{5})_{2}O. It is a colorless, low-melting solid. This compound, the simplest diaryl ether, has a variety of niche applications.

== Synthesis and reactions ==
Diphenyl ether was discovered by Heinrich Limpricht and Karl List in 1855, when they reproduced Carl Ettling's destructive distillation of copper benzoate and separated it from the low-melting oily distillate components ignored by previous researchers. They named the compound phenyl oxide (German: Phenyloxyd) and studied some of its derivatives. Many methods were examined including the use of benzenediazonium salts and various phenoxides.

It is synthesized by a Ullmann-like reaction of sodium phenoxide and bromobenzene in the presence of copper:

PhOH + PhBr → PhOPh + HBr

Involving similar reactions, diphenyl ether is a significant side product in the high-pressure hydrolysis of chlorobenzene in the production of phenol.

Related compounds are prepared by Ullmann reactions.

The compound undergoes reactions typical of other phenyl rings, including hydroxylation, nitration, halogenation, sulfonation, and Friedel–Crafts alkylation or acylation.

== Uses ==
The main application of diphenyl ether is as a eutectic mixture with biphenyl, used as a heat transfer fluid. Such a mixture is well-suited for heat transfer applications because of the relatively large temperature range of its liquid state. A eutectic mixture (commercially, Dowtherm A) is 73.5% diphenyl ether and 26.5% biphenyl.

Diphenyl ether is a starting material in the production of phenoxathiin via the Ferrario reaction. Phenoxathiin is used in polyamide and polyimide production.

Because of its odor reminiscent of scented geranium, as well as its stability and low price, diphenyl ether is used widely in soap perfumes. Diphenyl ether is also used as a processing aid in the production of polyesters.

== Related compounds ==
Several polybrominated diphenyl ethers (PBDEs) are useful flame retardants. Of penta-, octa-, and decaBDE, the three most common PBDEs, only decaBDE is still in widespread use since its ban in the European Union in 2003. DecaBDE, also known as decabromodiphenyl oxide, is a high-volume industrial chemical with over 450,000 kilograms produced annually in the United States. Decabromodiphenyl oxide is sold under the trade name Saytex 102 as a flame retardant in the manufacture of paints and reinforced plastics.
