= Diphenyl telluride =

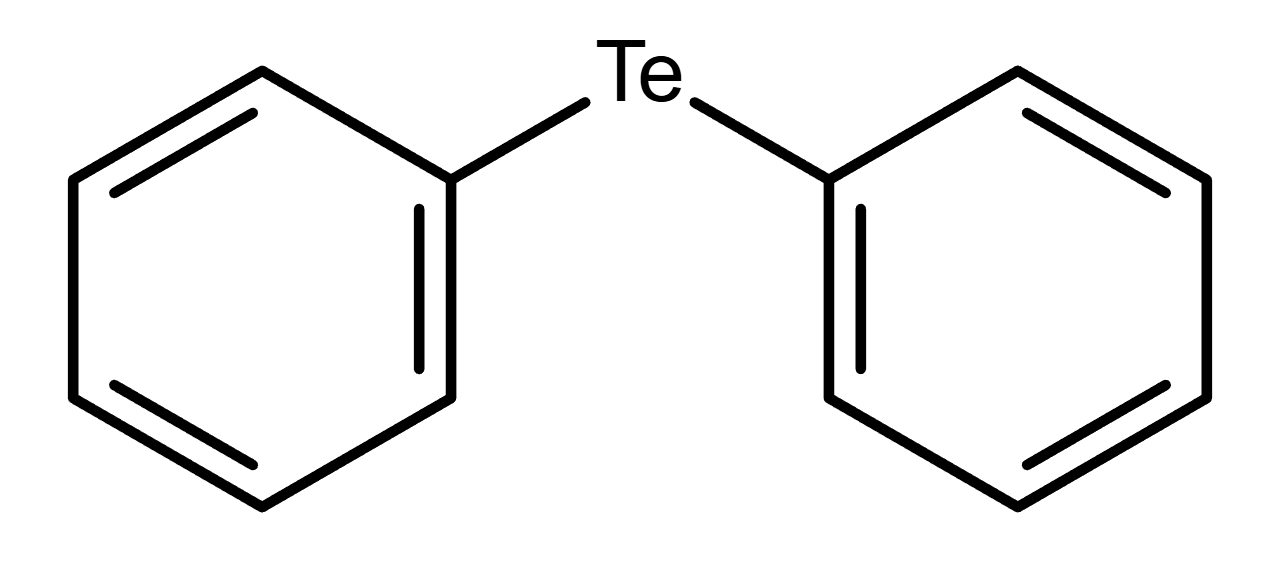

Names
- IUPAC name Phenyltellanylbenzene
- Other names: 1,1′-Tellanyldibenzene; Benzene, 1,1′-tellurobis-; 1,1'-Tellurobis(benzene); Diphenyl telluride; Diphenyltellane; Diphenyltellurium

Identifiers
| CAS Number | 1202-36-4 |
| 3D model (JSmol) | Interactive image |
| ChemSpider | 64156 |
| ECHA InfoCard | 100.013.514 |
| EC Number | 214-865-9 |
| PubChem CID | 70995 |
| CompTox Dashboard (EPA) | DTXSID00152730 |
- InChI: InChI=1S/C12H10Te/c1-3-7-11(8-4-1)13-12-9-5-2-6-10-12/h1-10H Key: XTCBHFKSTRGVMZ-UHFFFAOYSA-N
- SMILES: C1=CC=C(C=C1)[Te]C2=CC=CC=C2

Properties
| Chemical formula | (C_{6}H_{5})_{2}Te |
| Molar mass | 281.81 g·mol^{−1} |
| Appearance | yellow oily liquid |
| Odor | Unpleasant |
| Boiling point | 182 °C (14 mmHg); 172 °C (10 mmHg); 110–112 °C (vacuum) |
| Solubility in water | Very soluble in diethyl ether, practically insoluble in cold ethanol, very soluble in hot ethanol |

Hazards
- Occupational safety and health (OHS/OSH)
| Main hazards | Toxic |
- Lethal dose or concentration (LD, LC)
| LD_{50} (median dose) | 250 mg/kg (rat, intraperitoneal) |

Related compounds
| Related compounds | Diphenyl ether; Diphenyl sulfide; Diphenyl selenide; Diphenyl ditelluride |
- Except where otherwise noted, data are given for materials in their standard state (at 25 °C [77 °F], 100 kPa). Infobox references

Diphenyl telluride is an organotellurium compound with the chemical formula (C_{6}H_{5})_{2}Te. It is a yellow liquid or solid, depending on purity and temperature, and it has a strong refractive index. It is a member of the diphenyl chalcogenide series containing diphenyl ether, diphenyl sulfide, and diphenyl selenide.

== Preparation ==
Diphenyl telluride can be prepared by the reaction of elemental tellurium and diphenylmercury.

2 Te + (C_{6}H_{5})_{2}Hg → (C_{6}H_{5})_{2}Te + HgTe

The reactants are heated to 220 °C (428 °F) for several hours in a melting tube filled with carbon dioxide. After cooling, a grey-black crystalline slurry permeated with liquid diphenyl telluride is obtained. Diphenyl telluride can then be isolated from the mixture using diethyl ether and filtration. After removal of the ether, diphenyl telluride as a yellow oily liquid remains.

It can also be prepared by reflux reaction of diphenyl ditelluride and copper in toluene.

== Structure ==
Its molecule consists of two phenyl rings C_{6}H_{5}− bridged by a single tellurium atom.

== Reactions ==
Diphenyl telluride decomposes upon heating to 312–320 °C (594–608 °F) to benzene and a bright-lustrous crystalline solid.

Upon addition of hydrochloric acid, under heating and presence of oxygen, the diphenyltellurium(IV) dichloride is formed.

2 (C_{6}H_{5})_{2}Te + 4 HCl + O_{2} → 2 (C_{6}H_{5})_{2}TeCl_{2} + 2 H_{2}O

It reacts with iodomethane and silver tetrafluoroborate in 1,2-dichloroethane to obtain the salt of methyl(diphenyl)telluronium tetrafluoroborate [CH_{3}(C_{6}H_{5})_{2}Te]^{+}[BF_{4}]^{−}.

== Safety ==
Organotellurium compounds, such as diphenyl telluride, are cytotoxic, triggering cell apoptosis.
