= Diphenyl sulfone =

Names
- Preferred IUPAC name 1,1′-Sulfonyldibenzene
- Other names Diphenyl sulphone

Identifiers
CAS Number	127-63-9
3D model (JSmol)	Interactive image
ChEBI	CHEBI:78360
ChemSpider	29117
ECHA InfoCard	100.004.413
PubChem CID	31386
UNII	V25W2CFS3M
CompTox Dashboard (EPA)	DTXSID6041892
- InChI: InChI=1S/C12H10O2S/c13-15(14,11-7-3-1-4-8-11)12-9-5-2-6-10-12/h1-10H Key: KZTYYGOKRVBIMI-UHFFFAOYSA-N; InChI=1/C12H10O2S/c13-15(14,11-7-3-1-4-8-11)12-9-5-2-6-10-12/h1-10H Key: KZTYYGOKRVBIMI-UHFFFAOYAU
- SMILES: O=S(=O)(c1ccccc1)c2ccccc2

Properties
Chemical formula	C_{12}H_{10}O_{2}S
Molar mass	218.27 g·mol^{−1}
Appearance	White solid
Melting point	123 °C (253 °F; 396 K)
Boiling point	379 °C (714 °F; 652 K)
- Except where otherwise noted, data are given for materials in their standard state (at 25 °C [77 °F], 100 kPa). Infobox references

Diphenyl sulfone is an organosulfur compound with the formula (C_{6}H_{5})_{2}SO_{2}. It is a white solid that is soluble in organic solvents. It is a simple example of a molecule with a sulfone functional group.

== Uses ==
It is used as a high temperature solvent. Such high temperature solvents are useful for processing highly rigid polymers, such as PEEK, which only dissolve in very hot solvents.

== Preparation and reactions ==
Diphenyl sulfone is produced by the sulfonation of benzene with sulfuric acid and oleum. For typical processes, benzenesulfonic acid is an intermediate. It is also produced from benzenesulfonyl chloride and benzene.

Oxidation of diphenylsulfide with 30% hydrogen peroxide efficiently gives the sulfone in the presence of a tungstate catalyst.

(C_{6}H_{5})_{2}S + 2 H_{2}O_{2} → (C_{6}H_{5})_{2}SO_{2} + 2 H_{2}O

Diphenyl sulfone reacts with butyllithium to give the dilithio derivative:

(C_{6}H_{5})_{2}SO_{2} + 2 C_{4}H_{9}Li → (C_{6}H_{4}Li)_{2}SO_{2} + 2 C_{4}H_{10}

The dilithio derivative can be quenched with a variety of electrophiles
