= Pentafluorosulfanylbenzene =

Names
- Preferred IUPAC name Pentafluoro(phenyl)-λ^{6}-sulfane
- Other names Phenylsulfur pentafluoride, PhSF5

Identifiers
CAS Number	2557-81-5
3D model (JSmol)	Interactive image
ChemSpider	8118076
ECHA InfoCard	100.150.718
EC Number	621-907-3
PubChem CID	9942464
CompTox Dashboard (EPA)	DTXSID90433126
- InChI: InChI=1S/C6H5F5S/c7-12(8,9,10,11)6-4-2-1-3-5-6/h1-5H Key: DMNYFEWFSFTYEL-UHFFFAOYSA-N
- SMILES: C1=CC=C(C=C1)S(F)(F)(F)(F)F

Properties
Chemical formula	C_{6}H_{5}F_{5}S
Molar mass	204.16 g·mol^{−1}
Appearance	Colorless liquid
Density	1.49 g/mL
Boiling point	149 °C (300 °F; 422 K)
log P	3.36

Hazards
- GHS labelling
Pictograms	(GHS07: Exclamation mark) (GHS02: Flammable)
Signal word	Warning
Hazard statements	H226, H302, H315, H319, H335
Precautionary statements	P210, P233, P240, P241, P242, P243, P261, P270, P271, P280, P302+P352, P303+P361+P353, P304+P340, P305+P351+P338, P321, P330, P362+P364, P370+P378, P403+P233, P403+P235, P405, P501
- Except where otherwise noted, data are given for materials in their standard state (at 25 °C [77 °F], 100 kPa). Infobox references

Pentafluorosulfanylbenzene, or phenylsulfur pentafluoride, is an organosulfur compound with the formula C_{6}H_{5}SF_{5}. It is colorless liquid with high chemical stability.

== Reactivity ==
Pentafluorosulfanylbenzene possesses high chemical stability under a wide range of conditions including oxidizing, reducing, strongly acidic and strongly basic environments. For example, it does not react with a refluxing solution of sodium hydroxide in aqueous ethanol, but it can react with concentrated sulfuric acid at elevated temperatures. The pentafluorosulfanyl group is a strong electron withdrawing group, and leads to electrophilic aromatic substitution reactions at the meta position.

== Synthesis ==
Pentafluorosulfanylbenzene was originally synthesized by fluorination of diphenyl disulfide by AgF_{2}. Even with xenon difluoride, the method suffers from low yield. Contrariwise, using dichlorine as oxidant and a fluoride salt as fluorine source generally gives excellent yields.

Better techniques add the pentafluorosulfur moiety, then aromatize the ring. The simplest case dehydrogenates the corresponding dihydrobenzene from a Diels-Alder cycloaddition:
$$\ce{H2C=CH-CH=CH2 + F5SC#CH -> F5SC6H7}$$
$$\ce{F5SC6H7 ->[\ce{Pt},\Delta] F5SC6H5 + H2}$$
A more modern technique instead adds SF_{5}Cl radically to a dichlorocyclohexene, then dehydrohalogenates.

== Analytics ==
Pentafluorosulfanylbenzene in CDCl_{3} appears in ^{19}F NMR as two distinct signal. The four equatorial fluorine atom at +63.2 ppm as a doublet (J = 147.7 Hz) and the axial fluorine as a multiplet between +85.0 and +86.6 ppm.
