= Diphenyl selenide =

Identifiers
CAS Number	1132-39-4
3D model (JSmol)	Interactive image
ChemSpider	13694
EC Number	214-474-3
PubChem CID	14333
UNII	K6MKC9X9CZ
CompTox Dashboard (EPA)	DTXSID8061551
- InChI: InChI=1S/C12H10Se/c1-3-7-11(8-4-1)13-12-9-5-2-6-10-12/h1-10H Key: ORQWTLCYLDRDHK-UHFFFAOYSA-N
- SMILES: C1=CC=C(C=C1)[Se]C2=CC=CC=C2

Properties
Chemical formula	C_{12}H_{10}Se
Molar mass	233.183 g·mol^{−1}
Appearance	Yellow oil
Boiling point	165–167 °C (329–333 °F; 438–440 K) 12 mm Hg

Hazards
- GHS labelling
Pictograms	(GHS06: Toxic) (GHS08: Health hazard) (GHS09: Environmental hazard)
Signal word	Danger
Hazard statements	H301, H331, H373, H410
Precautionary statements	P260, P264, P270, P271, P273, P301+P316, P304+P340, P316, P319, P321, P330, P391, P403+P233, P405, P501

Related compounds
Related compounds	Diphenyl ether; Diphenyl sulfide; Diphenyl telluride
- Except where otherwise noted, data are given for materials in their standard state (at 25 °C [77 °F], 100 kPa). Infobox references

Diphenyl selenide is an organoselenium compound with the formula (C_{6}H_{5})_{2}Se. A pale yellow viscous liquid, it is a member of the series diphenyl ether, diphenyl sulfide, and diphenyl telluride. It can be prepared by treating phenyldiazonium chloride with sodium polyselenide.

== Selected reactions ==
It can be oxidized with aqua regia to give diphenylselenium dichloride ((C_{6}H_{5})_{2}SeCl_{2}). When oxidized with hydrogen peroxide, diphenylselenoxide ((C_{6}H_{5})_{2}SeO) results.
