= Benzeneselenol =

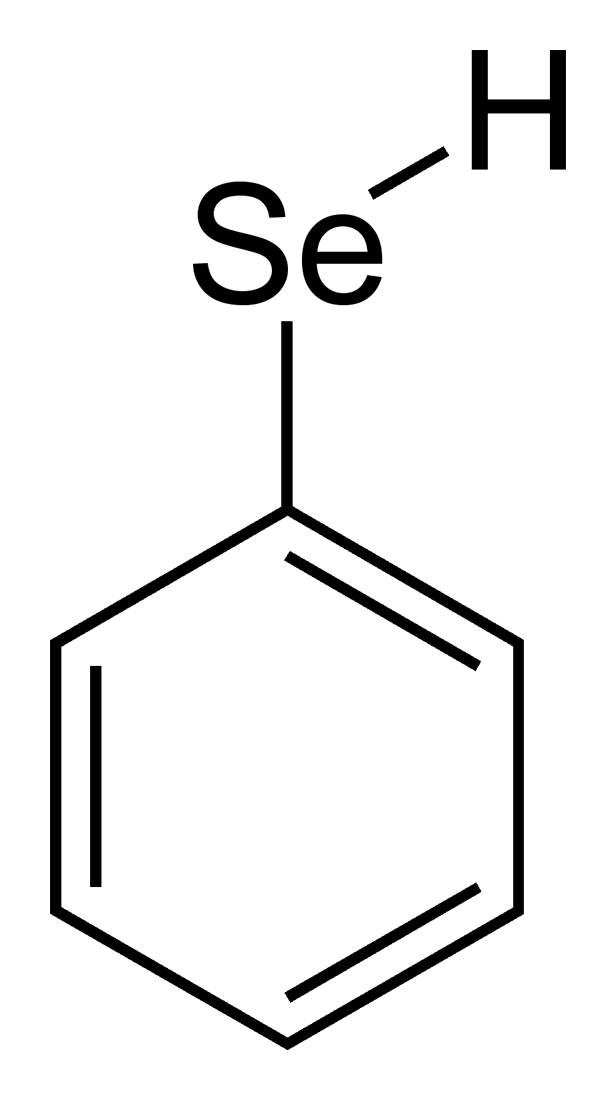

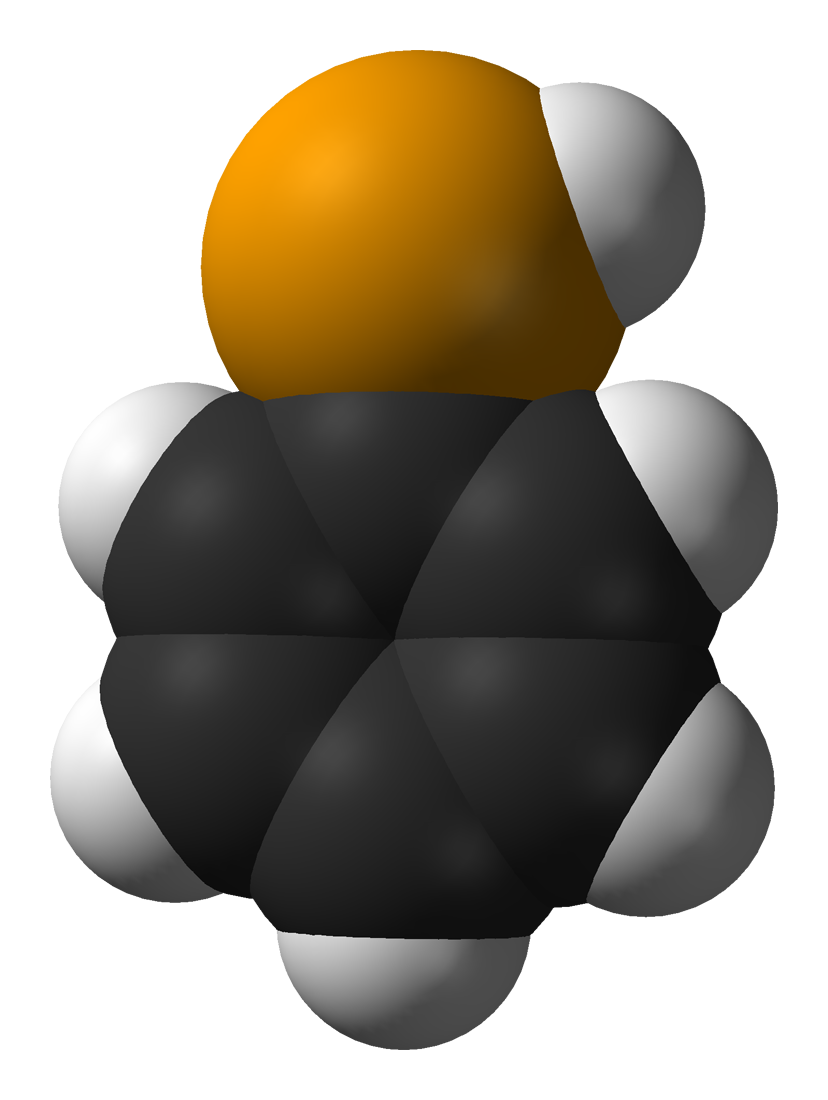

Names
- IUPAC name Benzeneselenol
- Other names: Phenylselenol; Selenaphenol; Selenophenol

Identifiers
CAS Number	645-96-5
3D model (JSmol)	Interactive image
ChemSpider	62734
ECHA InfoCard	100.010.417
EC Number	211-457-2
PubChem CID	69530
CompTox Dashboard (EPA)	DTXSID30275709
- InChI: InChI=1S/C6H6Se/c7-6-4-2-1-3-5-6/h1-5,7H Key: WDODWFPDZYSKIA-UHFFFAOYSA-N; InChI=1/C6H6Se/c7-6-4-2-1-3-5-6/h1-5,7H Key: WDODWFPDZYSKIA-UHFFFAOYAD
- SMILES: [SeH]c1ccccc1

Properties
Chemical formula	C_{6}H_{6}Se
Molar mass	157.085 g·mol^{−1}
Appearance	colorless liquid
Odor	extremely foul yet characteristic
Density	1.479 g/cm^{3}
Boiling point	71 to 72 °C (160 to 162 °F; 344 to 345 K) (18 mmHg)
Solubility in water	slightly
Solubility in other solvents	most organic solvents
Refractive index (n_{D})	1.616

Structure
Dipole moment	1.1 D

Hazards
- Occupational safety and health (OHS/OSH)
Main hazards	toxic
- GHS labelling
Pictograms	(GHS06: Toxic) (GHS08: Health hazard) (GHS09: Environmental hazard)
Signal word	Danger
Hazard statements	H301, H331, H373, H410

Related compounds
Related compounds	Phenol; Thiophenol; Benzenetellurol; Hydrogen selenide; Diphenyl diselenide
- Except where otherwise noted, data are given for materials in their standard state (at 25 °C [77 °F], 100 kPa). verify (what is ?) Infobox references

Benzeneselenol, also known as selenophenol, is the organoselenium compound with the formula C_{6}H_{6}Se or C_{6}H_{5}SeH, often abbreviated PhSeH. It is the selenium analog of phenol. This colourless, malodorous compound is a reagent in organic synthesis.

== Synthesis ==
Benzeneselenol is prepared by the reaction of phenylmagnesium bromide and selenium:

PhMgBr + Se → PhSeMgBr
PhSeMgBr + HCl → PhSeH + MgBrCl

Since benzeneselenol does not have a long shelf life, it is often generated in situ. A common method is by reduction of diphenyldiselenide. A further reason for this conversion is that often, it is the anion that is sought.

== Reactions ==
More so than thiophenol, benzeneselenol is easily oxidized by air. The facility of this reaction reflects the weakness of the Se-H bond, bond dissociation energy of which is estimated to be between 67 and 74 kcal/mol. In contrast, the S-H BDE for thiophenol is near 80 kcal/mol. The product is diphenyl diselenide as shown in this idealized equation:

4 PhSeH + O_{2} → 2 PhSeSePh + 2 H_{2}O

The presence of the diselenide in benzeneselenol is indicated by a yellow coloration. The diselenide can be converted back to the selenol by reduction followed by acidification of the resulting PhSe^{−}.

PhSeH is acidic with a pK_{a} of 5.9. Thus at neutral pH, it is mostly ionized:

PhSeH → PhSe^{−} + H^{+}

It is approximately seven times more acidic than the related thiophenol. Both compounds dissolve in water upon the addition of base. The conjugate base is PhSe^{−}, a potent nucleophile.

== History ==
Benzeneselenol was first reported in 1888 by the reaction of benzene with selenium tetrachloride (SeCl_{4}) in the presence of aluminium trichloride (AlCl_{3}).

== Safety ==
The compound is intensely malodorous and, like other organoselenium compounds, toxic.
