= Diphenyl diselenide =

- Chemical structure of diphenyl diselenide

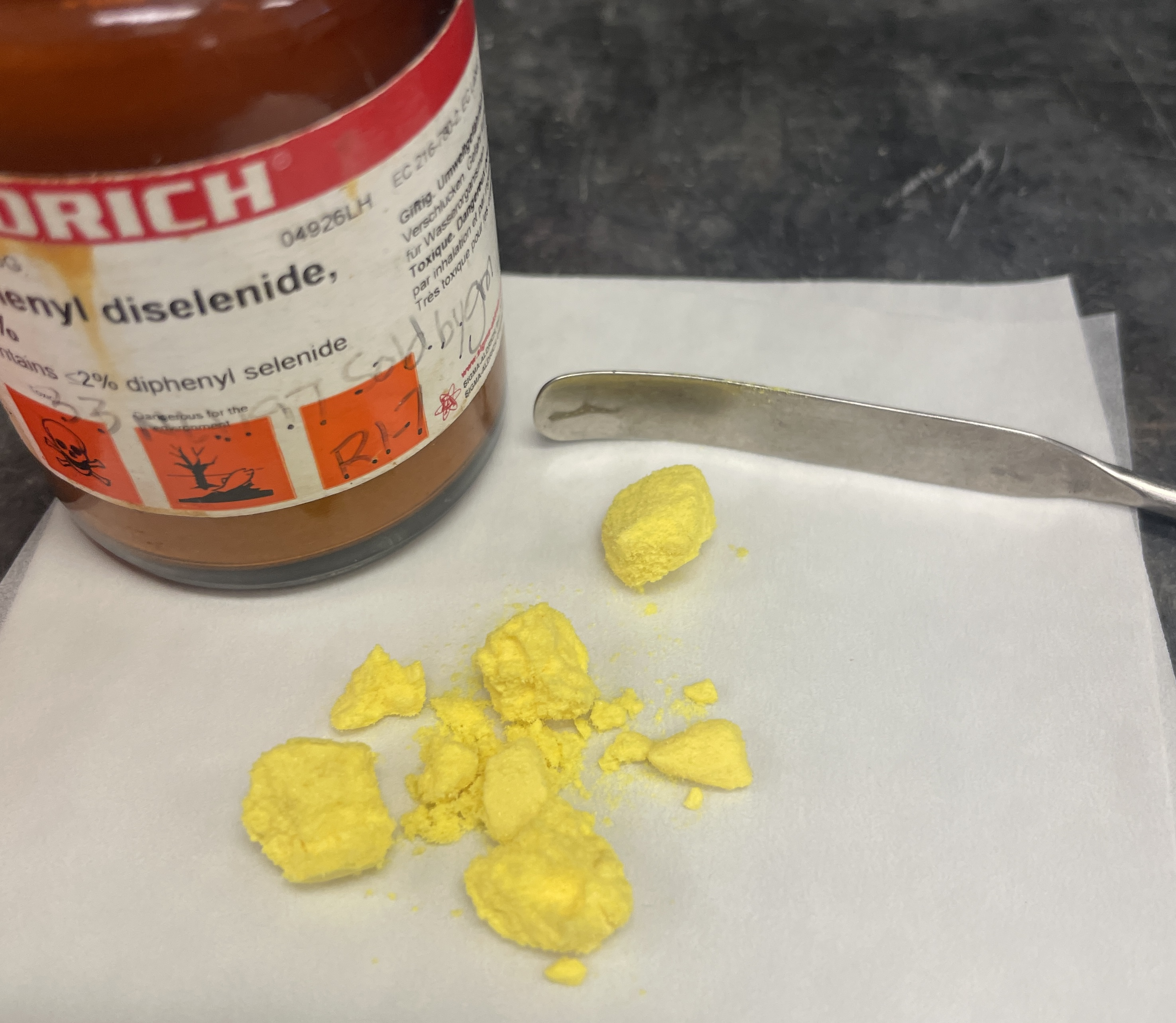

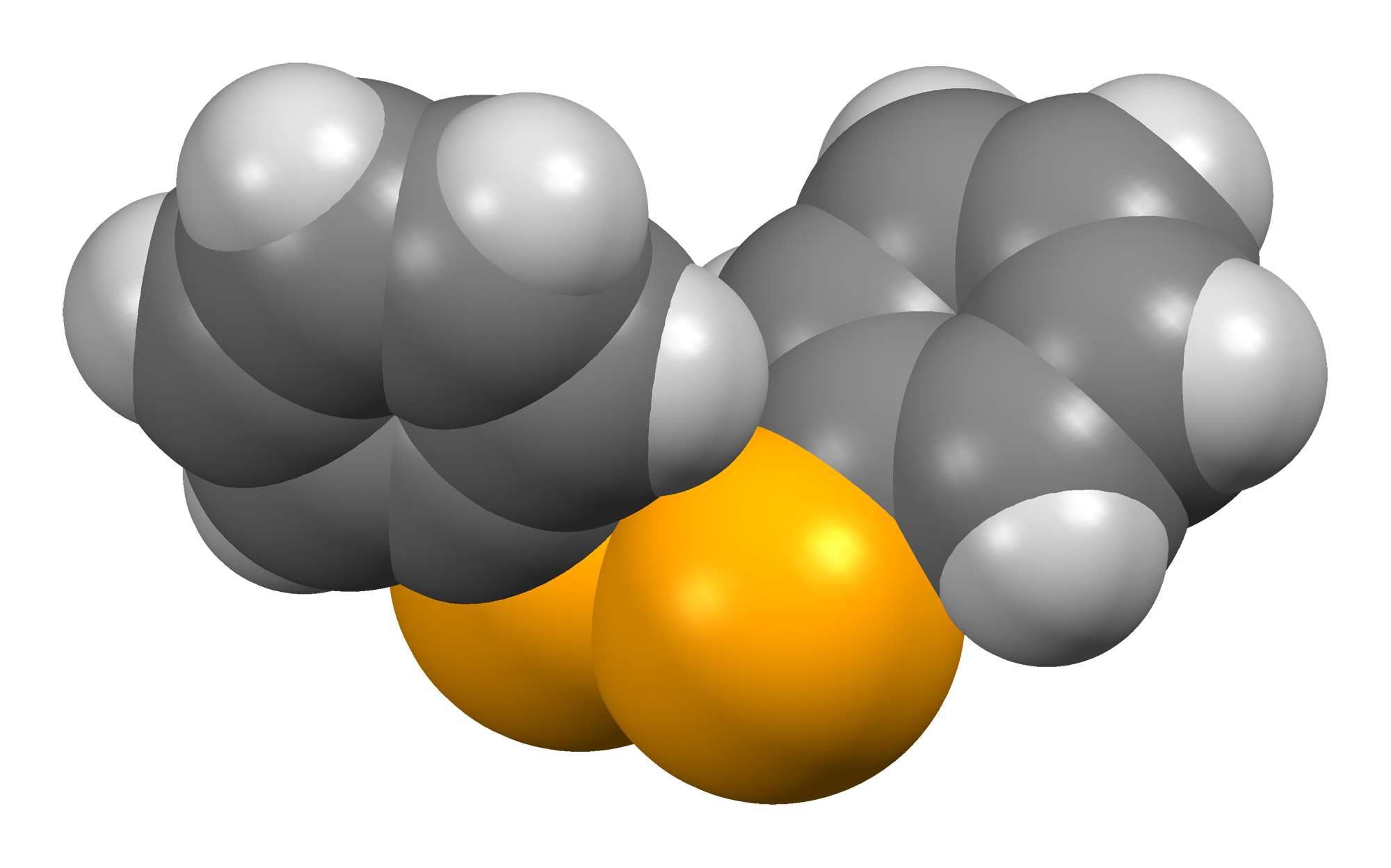
- Space-filling model

Names
- IUPAC name 1,1′-Diselanediyldibenzene
- Other names Phenyl diselenide

Identifiers
CAS Number	1666-13-3
3D model (JSmol)	Interactive image
ChemSpider	14710
ECHA InfoCard	100.015.256
EC Number	216-780-2
PubChem CID	15460
RTECS number	JM9152500
UNII	9ATU3Z459Q
CompTox Dashboard (EPA)	DTXSID6061864
- InChI: InChI=1S/C12H10Se2/c1-3-7-11(8-4-1)13-14-12-9-5-2-6-10-12/h1-10H Key: YWWZCHLUQSHMCL-UHFFFAOYSA-N; InChI=1/C12H10Se2/c1-3-7-11(8-4-1)13-14-12-9-5-2-6-10-12/h1-10H Key: YWWZCHLUQSHMCL-UHFFFAOYAK
- SMILES: c1ccc(cc1)[Se][Se]c2ccccc2

Properties
Chemical formula	C_{12}H_{10}Se_{2}
Molar mass	312.154 g·mol^{−1}
Appearance	Yellow crystals
Density	1.84 g/cm^{3}
Melting point	59 to 61 °C (138 to 142 °F; 332 to 334 K)
Solubility in water	Insoluble
Solubility in other solvents	Dichloromethane, THF, hot Hexane

Structure
Coordination geometry	90° at Se; C_{2} symmetry
Dipole moment	0 D

Hazards
- GHS labelling
Pictograms	(GHS06: Toxic) (GHS08: Health hazard) (GHS09: Environmental hazard)
Signal word	Danger
Hazard statements	H301, H331, H373, H410
Precautionary statements	P260, P264, P270, P271, P273, P301+P310, P304+P340, P311, P314, P321, P330, P391, P403+P233, P405, P501

Related compounds
Related compounds	Diphenyl disulfide; Diphenyl ditelluride; Benzeneselenol
- Except where otherwise noted, data are given for materials in their standard state (at 25 °C [77 °F], 100 kPa). verify (what is ?) Infobox references

Diphenyl diselenide is the chemical compound with the formula (C_{6}H_{5})_{2}Se_{2}, abbreviated Ph_{2}Se_{2}. This yellow-coloured solid is the oxidized derivative of benzeneselenol. It is used as a source of the PhSe unit in organic synthesis.

== Structure ==
Ph_{2}Se_{2} has idealized C_{2}-symmetry, like hydrogen peroxide and related molecules. The Se-Se bond length of 2.29 Å the C-Se-Se-C dihedral angle is 82° and the C-Se-Se angles are near 110°.

== Preparation ==
The molecule is prepared by the oxidation of benzeneselenoate, the conjugate base of benzeneselenol which is generated via the Grignard reagent:

PhMgBr + Se → PhSeMgBr
2 PhSeMgBr + Br_{2} → Ph_{2}Se_{2} + 2 MgBr_{2}

Alternatively, phenyl iodide undergoes photoinduced radical-nucleophilic aromatic substitution with sodium selenide to make benzeneselenoate ions:

PhI + Na_{2}Se → PhSeNa + NaI

== Medical applications ==
Diphenyl diselenide alleviates methylmercury poisoning in grass carp.

== Reactions ==
A reaction characteristic of Ph_{2}Se_{2} is its reduction:

Ph_{2}Se_{2} + 2 Na → 2 PhSeNa

PhSeNa is a useful nucleophile used to introduce the phenylselenyl group by nucleophilic substitution of alkyl halides, alkyl sulfonates (mesylates or tosylates) and epoxides. The example below was taken from a synthesis of morphine.

Another characteristic reaction is chlorination:

Ph_{2}Se_{2} + Cl_{2} → 2 PhSeCl

PhSeCl is a powerful electrophile, used to introduce PhSe groups by reaction with a variety of nucleophiles, including enolates, enol silyl ethers, Grignard reagents, organolithium reagents, alkenes and amines. In the sequence below (early steps in the synthesis of Strychnofoline), a PhSe group is introduced by reaction of a lactam enolate with PhSeCl. This sequence is a powerful method for the conversion of carbonyl compounds to their α,β-unsaturated analogs.

Diphenyl diselenide itself is also a source of a weakly electrophilic PhSe group in reactions with relatively powerful nucleophiles like Grignard reagents, lithium reagents and ester enolates (but not ketone enolates or weaker nucleophiles). PhSeCl is both more reactive, and more efficient, since with Ph_{2}Se_{2} half of the selenium is wasted.

Ph_{2}Se_{2} + Nu^{−} → PhSeNu + PhSe^{−}

N-Phenylselenophthalimide (N-PSP) can be used if PhSeCl is too strong and diphenyl diselenide is too weak or wasteful.
