= Thiophenol =

Skeletal formula
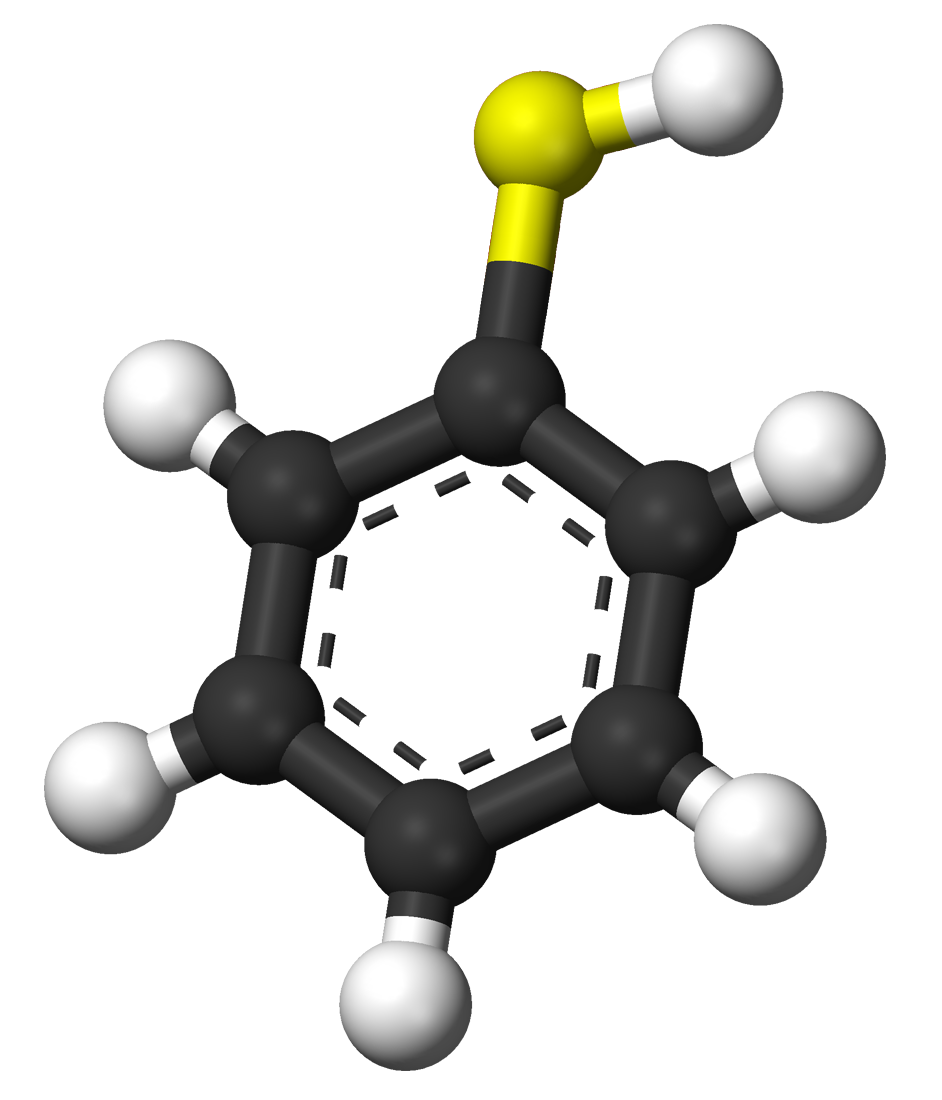
Ball-and-stick model

Names
- Preferred IUPAC name Benzenethiol
- Other names: Thiophenol (or phenylthiol); Phenyl mercaptan; Mercaptobenzene

Identifiers
CAS Number	108-98-5
3D model (JSmol)	Interactive image
Abbreviations	PhSH
Beilstein Reference	506523
ChEBI	CHEBI:48498
ChEMBL	ChEMBL119405
ChemSpider	7681
ECHA InfoCard	100.003.306
EC Number	203-635-3
PubChem CID	7969
RTECS number	DC0525000
UNII	7K011JR4T0
CompTox Dashboard (EPA)	DTXSID7026811
- InChI: InChI=1S/C6H6S/c7-6-4-2-1-3-5-6/h1-5,7H Key: RMVRSNDYEFQCLF-UHFFFAOYSA-N; InChI=1/C6H6S/c7-6-4-2-1-3-5-6/h1-5,7H Key: RMVRSNDYEFQCLF-UHFFFAOYAL
- SMILES: Sc1ccccc1

Properties
Chemical formula	C_{6}H_{6}S
Molar mass	110.17 g·mol^{−1}
Appearance	Colorless liquid
Odor	Unpleasant, pungent
Density	1.0766 g/mL
Melting point	−15 °C (5 °F; 258 K)
Boiling point	169 °C (336 °F; 442 K)
Solubility in water	0.08%
Solubility	Most organic solvents; aqueous base
Vapor pressure	1 mmHg (18°C)
Acidity (pK_{a})	6.62 (H_{2}O); 10.28 (DMSO)
Magnetic susceptibility (χ)	−70.8·10^{−6} cm^{3}/mol

Hazards
- Occupational safety and health (OHS/OSH)
Main hazards	Toxic
- GHS labelling
Pictograms	(GHS02: Flammable) (GHS05: Corrosive) (GHS06: Toxic) (GHS07: Exclamation mark) (GHS09: Environmental hazard)
Signal word	Danger
Hazard statements	H226, H300, H310, H314, H315, H330, H410
Precautionary statements	P210, P233, P240, P241, P242, P243, P260, P262, P264, P270, P271, P273, P280, P284, P301+P310, P301+P330+P331, P302+P350, P302+P352, P303+P361+P353, P304+P340, P305+P351+P338, P310, P312, P320, P321, P330, P332+P313, P361, P362, P363, P370+P378, P391, P403+P233, P403+P235, P405, P501
NFPA 704 (fire diamond)	4 2 1 OX
Flash point	56 °C; 132 °F; 329 K
- NIOSH (US health exposure limits)
PEL (Permissible)	none
REL (Recommended)	C 0.1 ppm (0.5 mg/m^{3}) [15-minute]
IDLH (Immediate danger)	N.D.

Related compounds
Related thiols	1,2-Benzenedithiol; Benzenemethanethiol
Related compounds	Phenol; Benzeneselenol; Benzenetellurol; Diphenyl disulfide
- Except where otherwise noted, data are given for materials in their standard state (at 25 °C [77 °F], 100 kPa). verify (what is ?) Infobox references

Thiophenol is an organosulfur compound with the formula C_{6}H_{5}SH, sometimes abbreviated as PhSH. This foul-smelling colorless liquid is the simplest aromatic thiol. The chemical structures of thiophenol and its derivatives are analogous to phenols, where the oxygen atom in the hydroxyl group (−OH) bonded to the aromatic ring in phenol is replaced by a sulfur atom. The prefix thio- implies a sulfur-containing compound and when used before a root word name for a compound which would normally contain an oxygen atom, in the case of 'thiol' that the alcohol oxygen atom is replaced by a sulfur atom.

Thiophenols also describes a class of compounds formally derived from thiophenol itself. All have a sulfhydryl group (-SH) covalently bonded to an aromatic ring. The organosulfur ligand in the medicine thiomersal is a thiophenol.

== Synthesis ==
There are several methods of synthesis for thiophenol and related compounds, although thiophenol itself is usually purchased for laboratory operations. 2 methods are the reduction of benzenesulfonyl chloride with zinc and the action of elemental sulfur on phenyl magnesium halide or phenyllithium followed by acidification.

Via the Newman–Kwart rearrangement, phenols (1) can be converted to the thiophenols (5) by conversion to the O-aryl dialkylthiocarbamates (3), followed by heating to give the isomeric S-aryl derivative (4).

In the Leuckart thiophenol reaction, the starting material is an aniline through the diazonium salt (ArN_{2}X) and the xanthate (ArS(C=S)OR). Alternatively, sodium sulfide and triazenes can react in organic solutions and yield thiophenols.

Thiophenol can be manufactured from chlorobenzene and hydrogen sulfide over alumina at 700 to 1,300 °F (371 to 704 °C). The disulfide is the primary byproduct. The reaction medium is corrosive and requires ceramic or similar reactor lining. Aryl iodides and sulfur in certain conditions may also produce thiophenols.

== Applications ==
Thiophenols are used in the production of pharmaceuticals including of sulfonamides. The antifungal agents butoconazole and merthiolate are derivatives of thiophenols.

== Properties and reactions ==
=== Acidity ===
Thiophenol has appreciably greater acidity than does phenol, as is shown by their pK_{a} values (6.62 for thiophenol and 9.95 for phenol). A similar pattern is seen for H_{2}S versus H_{2}O, and all thiols versus the corresponding alcohols. Treatment of PhSH with strong base such as sodium hydroxide (NaOH) or sodium metal affords the salt sodium thiophenolate (PhSNa).

=== Alkylation ===
The thiophenolate is highly nucleophilic, which translates to a high rate of alkylation. Thus, treatment of C_{6}H_{5}SH with methyl iodide in the presence of a base gives methyl phenyl sulfide, C_{6}H_{5}SCH_{3}, a thioether often referred to as thioanisole. Such reactions are fairly irreversible. C_{6}H_{5}SH also adds to α,β-unsaturated carbonyls via Michael addition.

=== Oxidation ===
Thiophenols, especially in the presence of base are easily oxidized to diphenyl disulfide:

4 C_{6}H_{5}SH + O_{2} → 2 C_{6}H_{5}S-SC_{6}H_{5} + 2 H_{2}O

The disulfide can be reduced back the thiol using sodium borohydride followed by acidification. This redox reaction is also exploited in the use of C_{6}H_{5}SH as a source of H atoms.

=== Chlorination ===
Phenylsulfenyl chloride, a blood-red liquid (b.p. 41–42 °C, 1.5 mm Hg), can be prepared by the reaction of thiophenol with sulfurylchloride (SO_{2}Cl_{2}).

=== Coordination to metals ===
Metal cations form thiophenolates, some of which are polymeric. One example is "C_{6}H_{5}SCu," obtained by treating copper(I) chloride with thiophenol.

== Safety ==
The US National Institute for Occupational Safety and Health has established a recommended exposure limit at a ceiling of 0.1 ppm (0.5 mg m^{−3}), and exposures not greater than 15 minutes.
