= Phenoxathiin =

Names
- Preferred IUPAC name Phenoxathiine
- Other names 1,4-Dibenzothioxine

Identifiers
CAS Number	262-20-4
3D model (JSmol)	Interactive image
ChemSpider	8862
ECHA InfoCard	100.005.433
PubChem CID	9217
UNII	BJC51V8XW8
CompTox Dashboard (EPA)	DTXSID4024937
- InChI: InChI=1S/C12H8OS/c1-3-7-11-9(5-1)13-10-6-2-4-8-12(10)14-11/h1-8H Key: GJSGGHOYGKMUPT-UHFFFAOYSA-N
- SMILES: c1ccc2c(c1)Oc3ccccc3S2

Properties
Chemical formula	C_{12}H_{8}OS
Molar mass	200.26 g·mol^{−1}
Melting point	52–56 °C (126–133 °F; 325–329 K)
Boiling point	150–152 °C (302–306 °F; 423–425 K) (at 5 mmHg)
- Except where otherwise noted, data are given for materials in their standard state (at 25 °C [77 °F], 100 kPa). Infobox references

Phenoxathiin (dibenzooxathiane) C_{12}H_{8}OS is a heterocyclic compound of molecular weight 200.25632 g/mol with the CAS Registry Number 262-20-4.

Diphenyl ether is a starting material in the production of phenoxathiin via the Ferrario reaction. Phenoxathiin is used in polyamide and polyimide production.
