= Ferrario–Ackermann reaction =

Chemical reaction

Named after	M. E. Ferrario; Fritz Ackermann
Reaction type	Ring forming reaction

In organic chemistry, the Ferrario–Ackermann reaction or simply the Ferrario reaction is a name reaction that allow for the generation of phenoxathiin from diphenyl ether and sulfur in the presence of aluminum chloride catalyst.
