= Edifenphos =

Names
- Preferred IUPAC name O-Ethyl S,S-diphenyl phosphorodithioate
- Other names O-Ethyl-S,S-diphenyldithiophosphate; EDDP

Identifiers
CAS Number	17109-49-8
3D model (JSmol)	Interactive image
ChEBI	CHEBI:34735
ChEMBL	ChEMBL1671900
ChemSpider	26320
ECHA InfoCard	100.037.420
KEGG	C14436
PubChem CID	28292
UNII	770M9U0F8Q
CompTox Dashboard (EPA)	DTXSID7041910
- InChI: InChI=1S/C14H15O2PS2/c1-2-16-17(15,18-13-9-5-3-6-10-13)19-14-11-7-4-8-12-14/h3-12H,2H2,1H3 Key: AWZOLILCOUMRDG-UHFFFAOYSA-N
- SMILES: CCOP(=O)(Sc1ccccc1)Sc2ccccc2

Properties
Chemical formula	C_{14}H_{15}O_{2}PS_{2}
Molar mass	310.37 g·mol^{−1}
Density	1.23 g/cm^{3}
Melting point	−25 °C (−13 °F; 248 K)
Solubility in water	56 mg/L (20 °C)

Hazards
- GHS labelling
Pictograms	(GHS06: Toxic) (GHS09: Environmental hazard)
Signal word	Danger
Hazard statements	H301, H311, H317, H331, H410
Precautionary statements	P261, P273, P280, P301+P310, P311, P501
- Except where otherwise noted, data are given for materials in their standard state (at 25 °C [77 °F], 100 kPa). Infobox references

Edifenphos (O-ethyl-S,S-diphenyldithiophosphate, EDDP) is a systemic fungicide that inhibits phosphatidylcholine biosynthesis. It was introduced in 1966 by Bayer to combat blast fungus and Pellicularia sasakii in rice cultivation. It was never authorized for use in the EU.
