= Benzenesulfonyl chloride =

Names
- Preferred IUPAC name Benzenesulfonyl chloride

Identifiers
| CAS Number | 98-09-9 |
| 3D model (JSmol) | Interactive image |
| ChemSpider | 7091 |
| ECHA InfoCard | 100.002.397 |
| PubChem CID | 7369 |
| UNII | OI9V0QJV9N |
| CompTox Dashboard (EPA) | DTXSID1026619 |
- InChI: InChI=1S/C6H5ClO2S/c7-10(8,9)6-4-2-1-3-5-6/h1-5H Key: CSKNSYBAZOQPLR-UHFFFAOYSA-N; InChI=1/C6H5ClO2S/c7-10(8,9)6-4-2-1-3-5-6/h1-5H Key: CSKNSYBAZOQPLR-UHFFFAOYAR
- SMILES: C1=CC=C(C=C1)S(=O)(=O)Cl

Properties
| Chemical formula | C_{6}H_{5}ClO_{2}S |
| Molar mass | 176.62 |
| Appearance | colourless liquid |
| Density | 1.384 g/mL at 25 °C(lit.) |
| Melting point | 13 to 14 °C (55 to 57 °F; 286 to 287 K) |
| Solubility in water | reacts |
- Except where otherwise noted, data are given for materials in their standard state (at 25 °C [77 °F], 100 kPa). Infobox references

Benzenesulfonyl chloride is an organosulfur compound with the formula C_{6}H_{5}SO_{2}Cl. It is a colourless viscous oil that dissolves in organic solvents, but reacts with compounds containing reactive N-H and O-H bonds. It is mainly used to prepare sulfonamides and sulfonate esters by reactions with amines and alcohols, respectively. The closely related compound toluenesulfonyl chloride is often preferred for laboratory use because it is a solid at room temperature and easier to handle.

== Production ==
The compound is prepared by the chlorosulfonation of benzene:

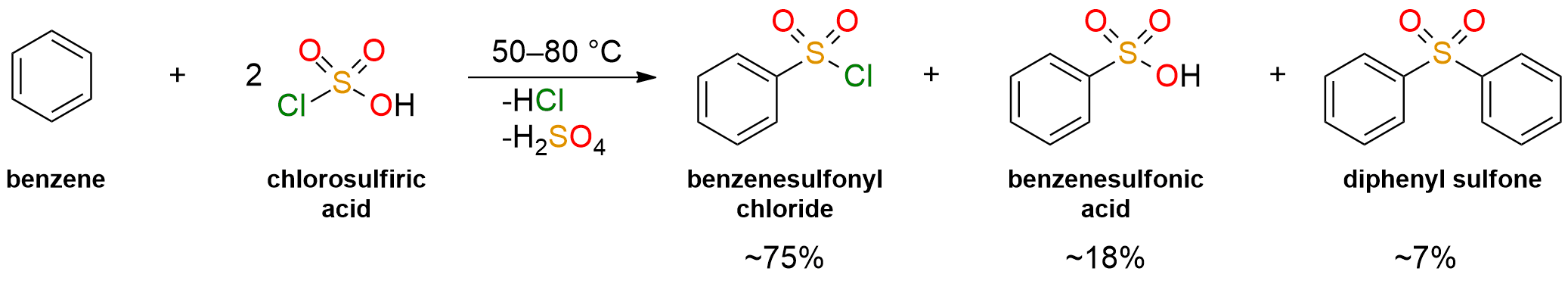

Benzenesulfonic acid is an intermediate in this conversion. Diphenylsulfone is a side product.

Benzenesulfonyl chloride can also be prepared by treating benzenesulfonate salts with phosphorus oxychloride.

== Reactions ==
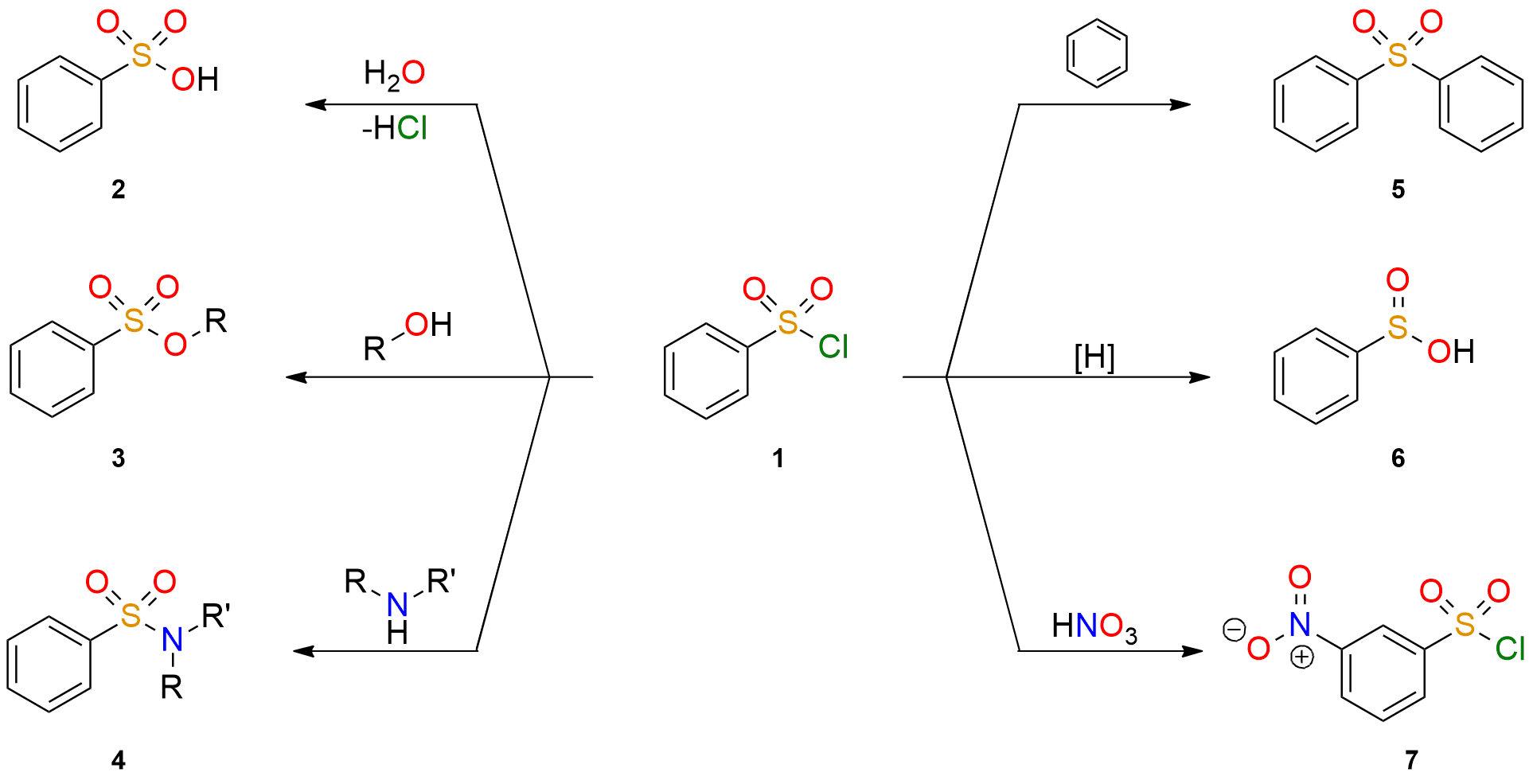

Benzenesulfonyl chloride is an electrophilic reagent. It hydrolyzes with heat but is stable toward cold water. Amines react to give sulfonamides. This reaction is the basis of the Hinsberg test for amines.
