= Diphenyl ditelluride =

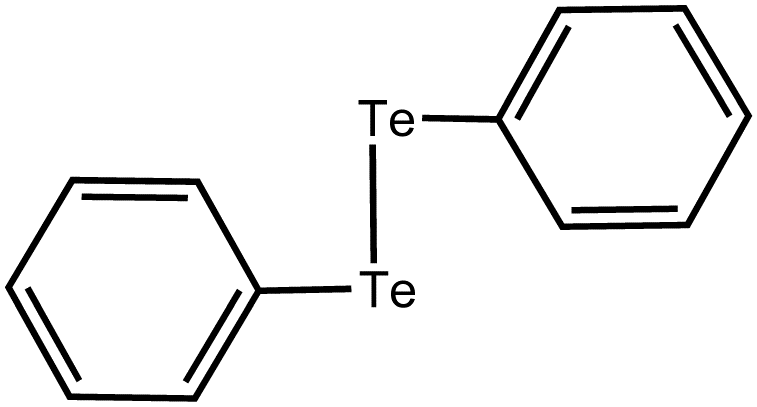

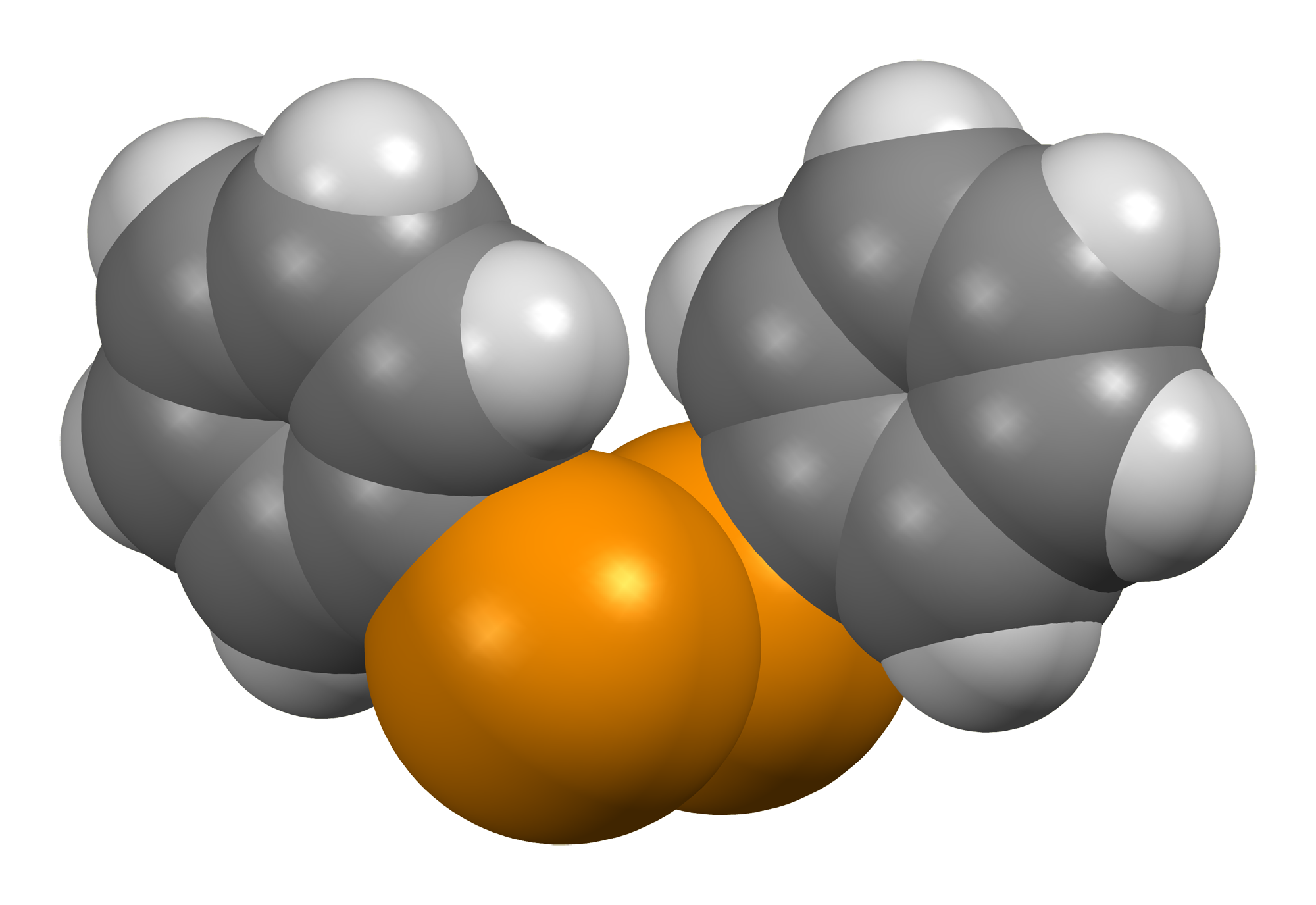

Names
- Preferred IUPAC name 1,1′-Ditellanediyldibenzene
- Other names Phenylditelluride; Diphenylditelluride

Identifiers
CAS Number	32294-60-3
3D model (JSmol)	Interactive image; Interactive image
ChEMBL	ChEMBL4540731
ChemSpider	90943
ECHA InfoCard	100.046.332
EC Number	250-982-1
PubChem CID	100657
UNII	PH6WV9U6X9
CompTox Dashboard (EPA)	DTXSID1043916
- InChI: InChI=1S/C12H10Te2/c1-3-7-11(8-4-1)13-14-12-9-5-2-6-10-12/h1-10H Key: VRLFOXMNTSYGMX-UHFFFAOYSA-N; InChI=1/C12H10Te2/c1-3-7-11(8-4-1)13-14-12-9-5-2-6-10-12/h1-10H Key: VRLFOXMNTSYGMX-UHFFFAOYAJ
- SMILES: C1([Te][Te]C2=CC=CC=C2)=CC=CC=C1; [Te]([Te]c1ccccc1)c2ccccc2

Properties
Chemical formula	C_{12}H_{10}Te_{2}
Molar mass	409.42 g/mol
Appearance	Orange powder
Density	2.23 g/cm^{3}
Melting point	66 to 67 °C (151 to 153 °F; 339 to 340 K)
Boiling point	decomposes
Solubility in water	Insoluble
Solubility in other solvents	Dichloromethane

Structure
Coordination geometry	90° at Se; C_{2} symmetry
Dipole moment	0 D

Hazards
- Occupational safety and health (OHS/OSH)
Main hazards	Toxic
- GHS labelling
Pictograms	(GHS07: Exclamation mark)
Signal word	Warning
Hazard statements	H302, H312, H315, H319, H332, H335
Precautionary statements	P261, P264, P270, P271, P280, P301+P312, P302+P352, P304+P312, P304+P340, P305+P351+P338, P312, P321, P322, P330, P332+P313, P337+P313, P362, P363, P403+P233, P405, P501

Related compounds
Related compounds	Diphenyl disulfide; Diphenyl diselenide
- Except where otherwise noted, data are given for materials in their standard state (at 25 °C [77 °F], 100 kPa). verify (what is ?) Infobox references

Diphenylditelluride is the chemical compound with the formula (C_{6}H_{5}Te)_{2}, abbreviated Ph_{2}Te_{2}. This orange-coloured solid is the oxidized derivative of the unstable benzenetellurol, PhTeH. Ph_{2}Te_{2} is used as a source of the PhTe unit in organic synthesis and as a catalyst for redox reactions. The compound is a strong nucleophile, easily displacing halides. It also adds electrophilically across multiple bonds, and traps radicals.

== Preparation ==
Ph_{2}Te_{2} is prepared by the oxidation of tellurophenolate, which is generated via the Grignard reagent:

PhMgBr + Te → PhTeMgBr
2PhTeMgBr + 0.5 O_{2} + H_{2}O → Ph_{2}Te_{2} + 2 MgBr(OH)

The molecule has C_{2} symmetry.
