= Diphenyl disulfide =

Names
- Preferred IUPAC name 1,1′-Disulfanediyldibenzene
- Other names Disulfanyldibenzene; Diphenyl disulfide Phenyl disulfide 1,2-Diphenyldisulfane (not recommended)

Identifiers
CAS Number	882-33-7
3D model (JSmol)	Interactive image
ChEBI	CHEBI:174102
ChEMBL	ChEMBL462861
ChemSpider	12861
ECHA InfoCard	100.011.752
EC Number	212-926-4
PubChem CID	13436
RTECS number	SS6825000
UNII	7P54H519IJ
CompTox Dashboard (EPA)	DTXSID6022131
- InChI: InChI=1S/C12H10S2/c1-3-7-11(8-4-1)13-14-12-9-5-2-6-10-12/h1-10H Key: GUUVPOWQJOLRAS-UHFFFAOYSA-N; InChI=1/C12H10S2/c1-3-7-11(8-4-1)13-14-12-9-5-2-6-10-12/h1-10H Key: GUUVPOWQJOLRAS-UHFFFAOYAY
- SMILES: c1ccc(cc1)SSc2ccccc2

Properties
Chemical formula	C_{12}H_{10}S_{2}
Molar mass	218.33 g·mol^{−1}
Appearance	Colorless crystals
Melting point	61 to 62 °C (142 to 144 °F; 334 to 335 K)
Solubility in water	Insoluble
Solubility in other solvents	Soluble in diethyl ether, benzene, carbon disulfide, and THF

Structure
Dipole moment	0 D

Hazards
- Occupational safety and health (OHS/OSH)
Main hazards	Flammable
- GHS labelling
Pictograms	(GHS07: Exclamation mark)
Signal word	Warning
Hazard statements	H315, H319, H335
Precautionary statements	P261, P264, P271, P273, P280, P302+P352, P304+P340, P305+P351+P338, P312, P321, P332+P313, P337+P313, P362, P391, P403+P233, P405, P501

Related compounds
Related compounds	Thiophenol, Dimethyl disulfide, Diphenyl diselenide
- Except where otherwise noted, data are given for materials in their standard state (at 25 °C [77 °F], 100 kPa). verify (what is ?) Infobox references

Diphenyl disulfide is the chemical compound with the formula (C_{6}H_{5}S)_{2}. This colorless crystalline material is often abbreviated Ph_{2}S_{2}. It is one of the more commonly encountered organic disulfides in organic synthesis. Minor contamination by thiophenol is responsible for the disagreeable odour associated with this compound.

== Preparation and structure ==
Diphenyl disulfide is usually prepared by the oxidation of thiophenol:

2 PhSH + I_{2} → Ph_{2}S_{2} + 2 HI

Hydrogen peroxide can also be used as the oxidant. Ph_{2}S_{2} is rarely prepared in the laboratory because it is inexpensive, and the precursor has a disagreeable odour.

Like most organic disulfides, the C–S–S–C core of Ph_{2}S_{2} is non-planar with a dihedral angle approaching 85°.

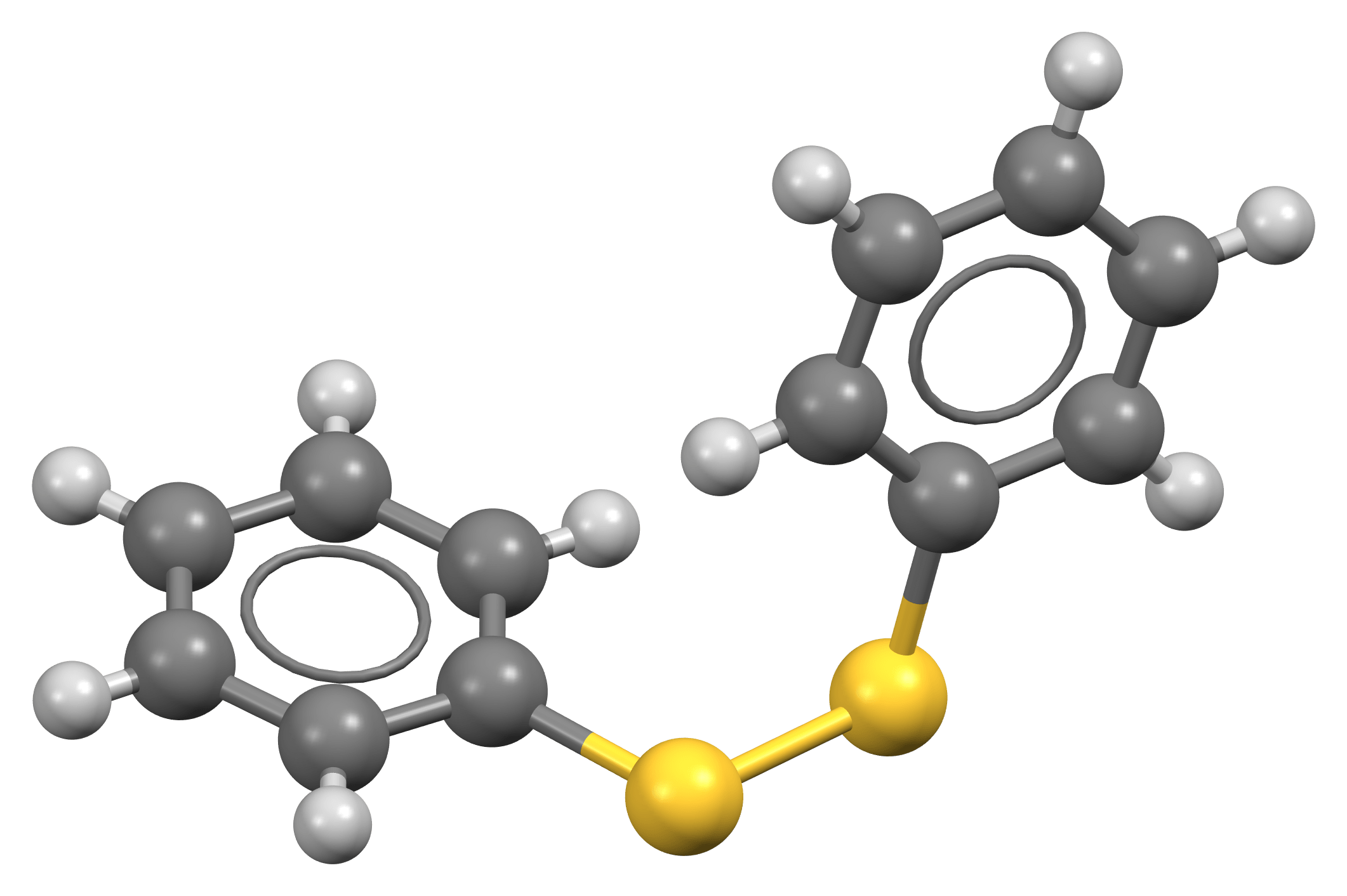
Ball-and-stick model of diphenyl disulfide. The S-S bond distance is 2.03 Å.

== Reactions ==
Ph_{2}S_{2} is mainly used in organic synthesis as a source of the PhS substituent. A typical reaction entails the formation of PhS-substituted carbonyl compounds via the enolate:

RC(O)CHLiR' + Ph_{2}S_{2} → RC(O)CH(SPh)R' + LiSPh

=== Reduction ===
Ph_{2}S_{2} undergoes reduction, a reaction characteristic of disulfides:

Ph_{2}S_{2} + 2 M → 2 MSPh (M = Li, Na, K)

Hydride reagents such as sodium borohydride and super hydride can also be used as reductants. The salts PhSM are sources of the potent nucleophile PhS^{−}. Most alkyl halides, RX (X = halide) convert it to the thioethers with the general formula RSPh. Analogously, protonation of MSPh gives thiophenol:

PhSM + HCl → HSPh + MCl

=== Halogenation ===
Ph_{2}S_{2} reacts with chlorine to give phenylsulfenyl chloride PhSCl (Zincke disulfide cleavage). This species is usually generated and used in situ. With xenon difluoride, Ph_{2}S_{2} reacts to give phenylsulfur pentafluoride.

=== Catalyst for photoisomerization of alkenes ===
Ph_{2}S_{2} catalyzes the cis-trans isomerization of alkenes under UV-irradiation.

=== Oxidation ===
Oxidation of Ph_{2}S_{2} with lead(IV) acetate (Pb(OAc)_{4}) in methanol affords the sulfinite ester PhS(O)OMe.
