= Pseudohalogen =

Compounds with similar properties to polyatomic halogens

Pseudohalogens (also known as halogenoids) are polyatomic analogues of halogens, whose chemistry, resembling that of the true halogens, allows them to substitute for halogens in several classes of chemical compounds. Pseudohalogens occur in pseudohalogen molecules, inorganic molecules of the general forms Ps–Ps or Ps–X (where Ps is a pseudohalogen group), such as cyanogen; pseudohalide anions, such as cyanide ion; inorganic acids, such as hydrogen cyanide; as ligands in coordination complexes, such as ferricyanide; and as functional groups in organic molecules, such as the nitrile group. Well-known pseudohalogen functional groups include cyanide, cyanate, thiocyanate, and azide.

== Definition ==
The pseudohalogen concept was introduced by Lothar Birckenbach and Karl Kellermann in 1925. They defined the word pseudohalogen in order to describe a pattern of halogen-like behavior while avoiding the disputed term radical; it is unclear whether this term had reached its modern sense at the time. They initially applied it to describe the chalcocyanate (cyanate OCN, thiocyanate SCN, selenocyanate SeCN, tellurocyanate TeCN), azide (N_{3}), and cyanide (CN) groups.

Cotton and Wilkinson (1968) give the following criteria for Ps to be an ideal pseudohalogen group:

- Ps_{2} is a volatile, covalently bonded molecular substance, which is symmetrical (structure Ps−Ps). The Ps group must contain more than one electronegative atom; interpseudohalogens Ps−Ps' must contain more than two such atoms.
- Ps_{2} reacts with metals M to yield salts M^{n+}(Ps^{−})_{n} that contain Ps^{−} anions, analogous to the ionic halides M^{n+}(X^{−})_{n}
- Ps^{−} reacts with oxidants to re-form Ps_{2}
- Ps also forms covalent pseudohalides APs_{n} analogous to the covalent halides AX_{n}
- In particular, Ps forms covalent compounds Ps−X and Ps−Ps' with other halogens X and pseudohalogens Ps' that are analogous to the interhalogens X−X'
- HPs is an acid
- The salts M^{n+}(Ps^{−})_{n} are insoluble for M^{n+} = Ag^{+}, Hg^{2+}_{2}, Pb^{2+}
- Ps^{−} forms similar metal complexes to the halogens, such as HgPs^{2−}_{4}, the pseudohalogen analog of tetrachloromercurate(II)

Downs and Adams (1973) provide a similar list of criteria, with additional comments as follows:

- Ps_{2} reversibly undergoes alkali-induced disproportionation: Ps_{2} + 2OH^{−} ⇌ Ps^{−} + OPs^{−} + H_{2}O
- Ps_{2} adds across double bonds: Ps_{2} + CH_{2}=CH_{2} → PsCH_{2}CH_{2}Ps
- Ambident pseudohalogens, such as thiocyanate, may form multiple isomeric compounds with other groups, such as methyl thiocyanate CH_{3}−SCN and methyl isothiocyanate CH_{3}−NCS
- Some pseudohalogens form trimeric anions analogous to the polyhalides X^{−}_{3}, such as (SeCN)^{−}_{3} and [I(SCN)_{2}]^{−}
- Hydrogen pseudohalides (HPs) are typically weaker acids than the hydrogen halides
- Ag^{+}, Hg^{2+}_{2}, Pb^{2+} pseudohalide salts are often sparingly soluble
- Pseudohalogen–metal complexes often have different stability constants to the analogous halogen–metal complexes

Not all these criteria need be met for Ps to be considered a pseudohalogen. For example, the parent compound (−OCN)_{2} of cyanate, a classical pseudohalogen group, has never been prepared. Conversely, if the class of pseudohalogen groups is widened to include any univalent group possessing several of the properties above, it becomes extremely broad, encompassing groups such as nitryl (NO_{2}), thiyl (RS), hydroxy (HO), fluorosulfate (FSO_{3}), and perchloryl (ClO_{3}).

Cotton and Wilkinson consider the most important pseudohalides to be cyanide, thiocyanate, selenocyanate, azide, cyanate, and CS_{2}N^{−}_{3} (whose structure was later determined to be that of the substituted heterocycle 1,2,3,4-thiatriazole-5-thiolate, (−S−C(−S^{−})=N−N=N−)). Golub and Köhler (1978) instead list azide, cyanide, fulminate CNO^{−}, cyanate, thiocyanate, selenocyanate, dicyanamide N(CN)^{−}_{2}, and tricyanomethanide C(CN)^{−}_{3}.

== Examples of pseudohalogen molecules ==
Examples of symmetrical pseudohalogen compounds (Ps−Ps, where Ps is a pseudohalogen) include cyanogen (CN)_{2}, thiocyanogen (SCN)_{2} and hydrogen peroxide H_{2}O_{2}. Another complex symmetrical pseudohalogen compound is dicobalt octacarbonyl, Co_{2}(CO)_{8}. This substance can be considered as a dimer of the hypothetical cobalt tetracarbonyl, Co(CO)_{4}.

Examples of non-symmetrical pseudohalogen compounds (pseudohalogen halides Ps−X, where Ps is a pseudohalogen and X is a halogen, or interpseudohalogens Ps^{1}−Ps^{2}, where Ps^{1} and Ps^{2} are two different pseudohalogens), analogous to the binary interhalogen compounds, are cyanogen halides like cyanogen chloride (Cl−CN), cyanogen bromide (Br−CN), nitryl fluoride (F−NO_{2}), nitrosyl chloride (Cl−NO) and chlorine azide (Cl−N_{3}), as well as interpseudohalogens like dinitrogen trioxide (O=N−NO_{2}), nitric acid (HO−NO_{2}) and cyanogen azide (N_{3}−CN).

Not all combinations of interpseudohalogens and pseudohalogen halides are known to be stable (e.g. sulfanol HS−OH).

== Pseudohalide ions ==
Pseudohalides form univalent anions which form binary acids with hydrogen and form insoluble salts with silver such as silver cyanide (AgCN), silver cyanate (AgOCN), silver fulminate (AgCNO), silver thiocyanate (AgSCN) and silver azide (AgN_{3}).

A common complex pseudohalide is a tetracarbonylcobaltate [Co(CO)_{4}]^{−}. The acid cobalt tetracarbonyl hydride HCo(CO)_{4} is in fact quite a strong acid, though its low solubility renders it not as strong as the true hydrogen halide.

The behavior and chemical properties of the above pseudohalides are identical to that of the true halide ions. The presence of the internal multiple bonds does not appear to affect their chemical behavior. For example, they can form strong acids of the type HX (compare hydrogen chloride HCl to hydrogen tetracarbonylcobaltate HCo(CO)_{4}), and they can react with metals M to form compounds like MX (compare sodium chloride NaCl to sodium azide NaN_{3}).

In addition to cyanate and thiocyanate, a range of other chalcogen and pnictogen analogs have been prepared or studied theoretically.

== Pseudohalides as covalent ligands ==
Many non-symmetric pseudohalides can bond covalently to give two isomeric products. For example, the conjugate acids of cyanate are cyanic acid (H–OCN) and isocyanic acid (H–NCO), which are tautomers of each other. The thiocyanate complexes [(NH_{3})_{5}Co-SCN]^{2+} and [(NH_{3})_{5}Co-NCS]^{2+} are linkage isomers of each other that are distinctly differently colored.

== Table of pseudohalogen groups ==
Many pseudohalogens are known by specialized common names according to where they occur in a compound. The true halogen chlorine is listed for comparison.

Group	Dimer	Hydrogen compound	Pseudohalide anion	Ligand name	In organic compounds	Formula	Structural formula	Ref
True halogens								
chloro	chlorine	hydrogen chloride	chloride	chlorido- chloro-	-yl chloride	~ Cl	−Cl	
Classical pseudohalogen groups								
cyano	cyanogen	hydrogen cyanide	cyanide	cyanido- cyano-	-nitrile -yl cyanide	~ CN	−C≡N	
isocyano	diisocyanogen	hydrogen isocyanide	cyanide	isocyanido- isocyano-	-yl isocyanide	~ NC	−N^{+}≡C^{−}	
cyanate	never isolated	cyanic acid	cyanate	cyanato-	-yl cyanate	~ OCN	−O−C≡N	
isocyanate	diisooxocyan	isocyanic acid	cyanate	isocyanato-	-yl isocyanate	~ NCO	−N=C=O	
thiocyanate	thiocyanogen	thiocyanic acid	thiocyanate	thiocyanato-	-yl thiocyanate	~ SCN	−S−C≡N	
isothiocyanate	isothiocyanogen	isothiocyanic acid	thiocyanate	isothiocyanato-	-yl isothiocyanate	~ NCS	−N=C=S	
selenocyanate	selenocyanogen	selenocyanic acid	selenocyanate	selenocyanato-	-yl selenocyanate	~ SeCN	−Se−C≡N	
isoselenocyanate	isoselenocyanogen	isoselenocyanic acid	selenocyanate	isoselenocyanato-	-yl isoselenocyanate	~ NCSe	−N=C=Se	
tellurocyanate	tellurocyanogen	tellurocyanic acid	tellurocyanate	tellurocyanato-	-yl tellurocyanate	~ TeCN	−Te−C≡N	
isotellurocyanate	isotellurocyanogen	isotellurocyanic acid	tellurocyanate	isotellurocyanato-	-yl isotellurocyanate	~ NCTe	−N=C=Te	
azide	hexanitrogen	hydrazoic acid	azide	azido-	-yl azide	~ N_{3}	−N^{−}−N^{+}≡N ↕ −N=N^{+}=N^{−}	
Other groups sometimes considered to be pseudohalogens
fulminate	cyanogen di-N-oxide	fulminic acid	fulminate	fulminato-	-nitrile oxide (Note: Syntheses of organic nitrile oxides from fulminates are rare.)	~ CNO	−C≡N^{+}−O^{−}	
dicyanamide	never isolated	never isolated	dicyanamide	dicyanamido-	-yl dicyanamide (Note: Alkyl dicyanamides have been prepared via the reaction RNH_{2} + 2ClCN → RN(CN)_{2} + 2HCl, rather than via dicyanamide acting as a nucleophile. While they have been hypothesized to be formed during the decomposition of dicyanamide-based ionic liquids, this is yet to be proven.)	~ N(CN)_{2}	···[NCNCN]^{−}···	
tricyanomethanide	hexacyanoethane	tricyanomethane (cyanoform)	tricyanomethanide	tricyanomethanido-	-yl tricyanomethanide	~ C(CN)_{3}	−C(−C≡N)_{3}	
1,2,3,4-thiatriazol-5-thiolate	bis(1,2,3,4-thiatriazol-5-yl)disulfane	2H-thiatriazole-5-thione (Note: As proven by X-ray crystallography, the pseudohalide acid is protonated at nitrogen rather than sulfur.)	1,2,3,4-thiatriazol-5-thiolate	1,2,3,4-thiatriazol-5-thiolato-	-yl 1,2,3,4-thiatriazol-5-thiolate	~ CS_{2}N_{3}		
trinitromethanide	hexanitroethane	trinitromethane (nitroform)	trinitromethanide	trinitromethanido-	-yl trinitromethanide	~ C(NO_{2})_{3}	−C(−NO_{2})_{3}	
cobalt carbonyl	dicobalt octacarbonyl	cobalt tetracarbonyl hydride	tetracarbonylcobaltate	tetracarbonylcobaltato-	-	~ Co(CO)_{4}	−Co(C≡O)_{4}	
cyapho	cyaphogen	phosphaethyne	cyaphide	cyaphido- cyapho-	-yl cyaphide	~ CP	−C≡P	
phosphaethynolate		never isolated	phosphaethynolate	phosphaethynolato-	-yl oxyphosphaalkyne	~ OCP	−O−C≡P	
phosphaketenyl	never isolated (Note: [O−C=P−P=C−O]^{4−}, a reduced version of diisophosphaethynolate, is known.)	phosphaketene	phosphaethynolate	phosphaketenyl-	-yl phosphaketene (Note: As of 2012, only 2,4,6-tri-tert-butylphenyl (supermesityl) and t-butyl phosphaketenes had been prepared in bulk, both via the reaction RP(Si(CH_{3})_{3})_{2} + COCl_{2} → RPCO + 2 (CH_{3})_{3}SiCl (R = Mes*, t-Bu). A transient W(CO)_{5}–methylphosphaketene complex has also been reported.)	~ PCO	−P=C=O	
hydroxyl	hydrogen peroxide (dioxidane)	water (oxidane)	hydroxide	hydroxido- hydroxy-	-ol	~ OH	−O−H	
sulfanyl	hydrogen disulfide (disulfane)	hydrogen sulfide (sulfane)	hydrosulfide	sulfanido- thiolato-	-thiol -yl mercaptane	~ SH	−S−H	
selanyl	hydrogen diselenide (diselane)	hydrogen selenide (selane)	hydroselenide	selanido- selenolato-	-selenol	~ SeH	−Se−H	
tellanyl	hydrogen ditelluride (ditellane)	hydrogen telluride (tellane)	hydrotelluride	tellanido- tellurolato-	-tellurol	~ TeH	−Te−H	
nitric oxide	dinitrogen dioxide	nitroxyl	nitroxide	nitrosyl	nitroso-	~ NO	−N=O	
nitrogen dioxide	dinitrogen tetroxide	nitrous acid	nitrite	nitryl	nitro-	~ NO_{2}	−NO_{2}	

=== Auride ===
Gold displays halogen-like behavior in certain respects, which have sometimes led it to be described as a 'pseudo-halogen', albeit its chemical properties are clearly distinct from the halogens and classical pseudohalogens. Gold atoms have the highest electron affinity of any metal, comparable to iodine atoms, and allowing gold to form stable Au^{−} salts in compounds like caesium auride CsAu. Gold also undergoes halogen-like disproportionation to Au(I) and Au(−I) when heated with alkali metals (Cs, Rb, K) together with their oxides, in reactions such as:

3Cs + 5Au + 2Cs_{2}O → Cs_{7}Au_{5}O_{2}, with structure [Cs^{+}Au^{−}]_{4}[(Cs^{+})_{3}(AuO_{2})^{3−}]

There are also some differences between the crystal chemical properties of Au^{−} compared to halides. In particular, the first excitation energy of Au^{−}, corresponding to the promotion of an electron from the 6s orbital to the 6p orbital, should be roughly half of the first excitation energy of I^{−}, which explains why the anionic character of gold in a formal Au(−I) oxidation state is far more dependent on its local chemical environment.

== See also ==
- Superhalogen
