= Hydrogen chalcogenide =

Chemical compound with hydrogen and chalcogen atoms

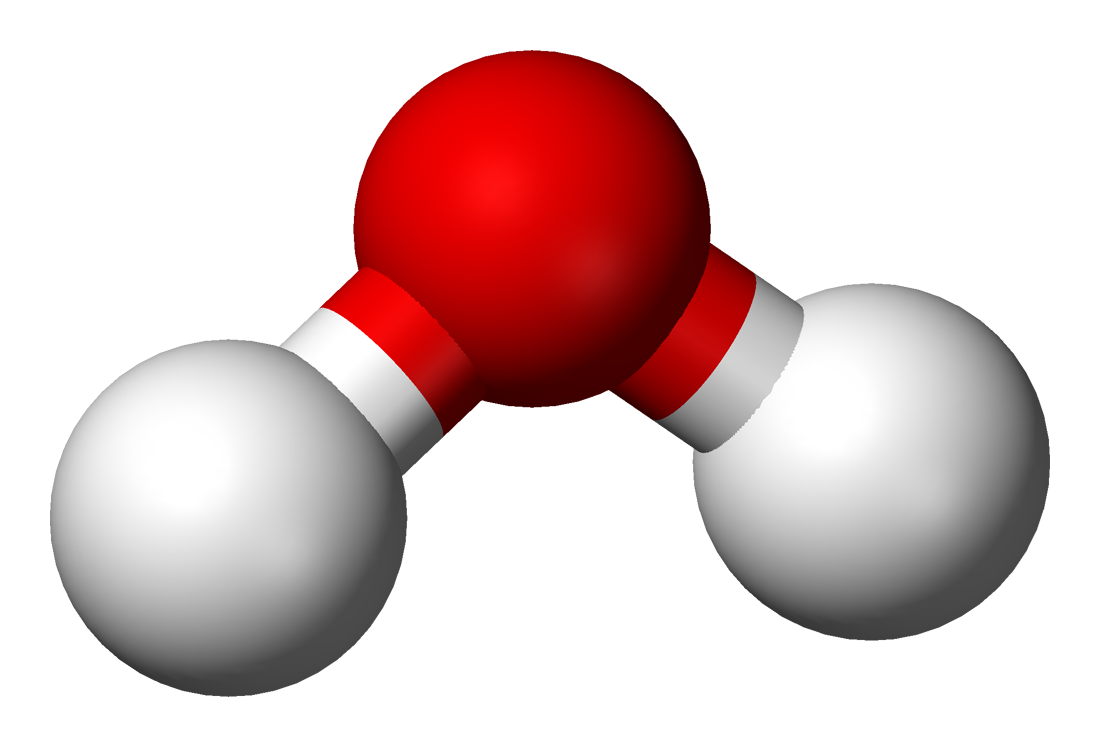
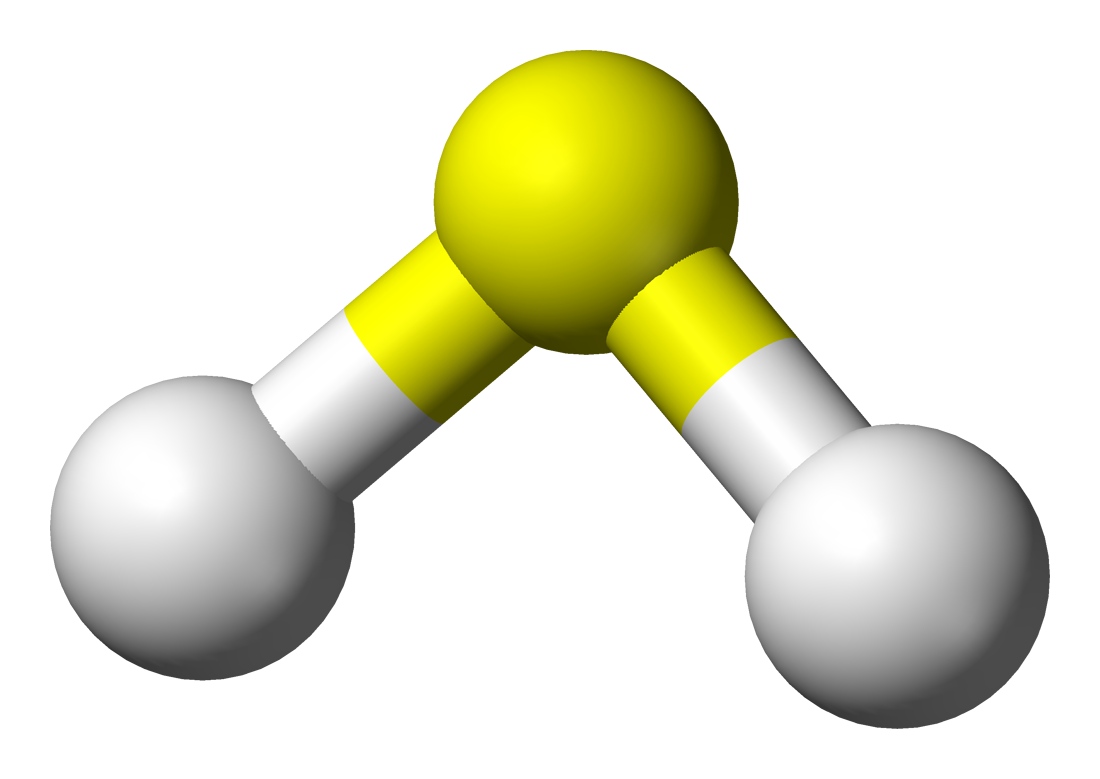

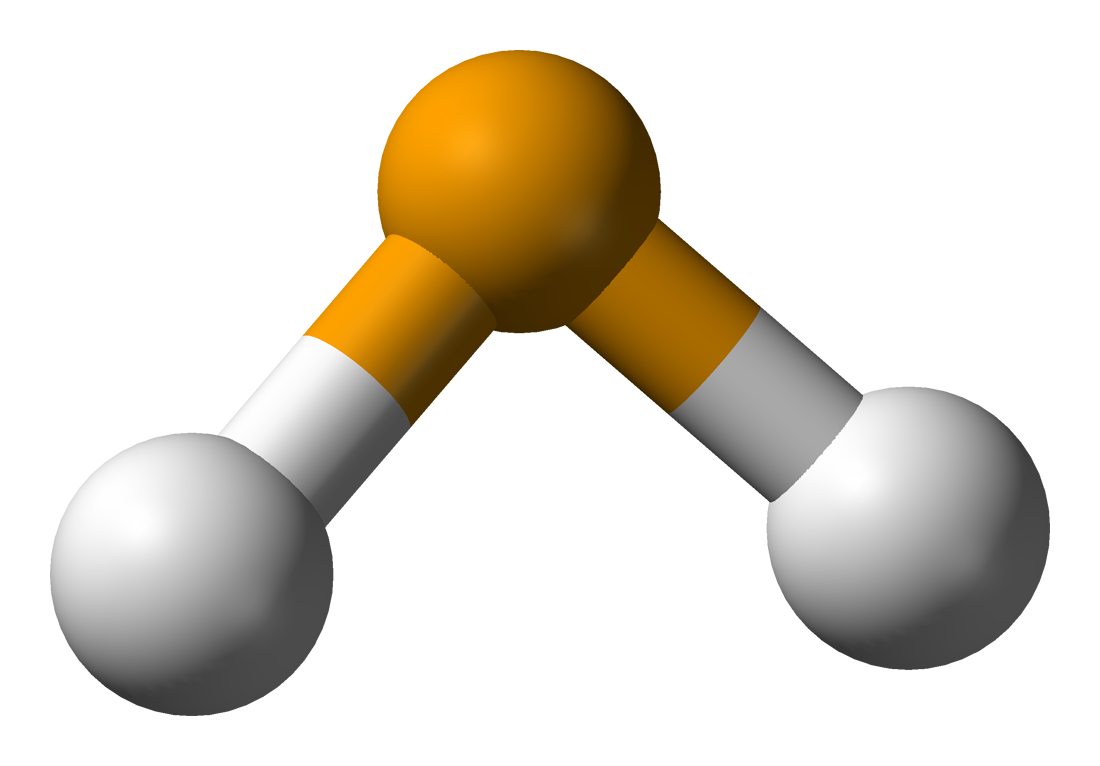
Water, hydrogen sulfide, and hydrogen selenide, three simple hydrogen chalcogenides

Hydrogen chalcogenides (also chalcogen hydrides or hydrogen chalcides) are binary compounds of hydrogen with chalcogen atoms (elements of group 16: oxygen, sulfur, selenium, tellurium, and polonium). Water, the first chemical compound in this series, contains one oxygen atom and two hydrogen atoms, and is the most common compound on the Earth's surface.

== Dihydrogen chalcogenides ==
The most important series, including water, has the chemical formula H_{2}X, with X representing any chalcogen. They are therefore triatomic. They take on a bent structure and as such are polar molecules. Water is an essential compound to life on Earth today, covering 70.9% of the planet's surface. The other hydrogen chalcogenides are usually extremely toxic, and have strong unpleasant scents usually resembling rotting eggs or vegetables. Hydrogen sulfide is a common product of decomposition in oxygen-poor environments and as such is one chemical responsible for the smell of flatulence. It is also a volcanic gas. Despite its toxicity, the human body intentionally produces it in small quantities for use as a signaling molecule.

Water can dissolve the other hydrogen chalcogenides (at least those up to hydrogen telluride), forming acidic solutions known as hydrochalcogenic acids. Although these are weaker acids than the hydrohalic acids, they follow a similar trend of acid strength increasing with heavier chalcogens, and also form in a similar way (turning the water into a hydronium ion H_{3}O^{+} and the solute into a XH^{−} ion). It is unknown if polonium hydride forms an acidic solution in water like its lighter homologues, or if it behaves more like a metal hydride (see also hydrogen astatide).

| Compound | As aqueous solution | Chemical formula | Geometry | pK_{a} | model |
|---|---|---|---|---|---|
| hydrogen oxide oxygen hydride water (oxidane) | water | H_{2}O | | 13.995 | |
| hydrogen sulfide sulfur hydride (sulfane) | hydrosulfuric acid | H_{2}S | | 7.0 | |
| hydrogen selenide selenium hydride (selane) | hydroselenic acid | H_{2}Se | | 3.89 | |
| hydrogen telluride tellurium hydride (tellane) | hydrotelluric acid | H_{2}Te | | 2.6 | |
| hydrogen polonide polonium hydride (polane) | hydropolonic acid | H_{2}Po | | ? | |

Some properties of the hydrogen chalcogenides follow:

| Property | H_{2}O | H_{2}S | H_{2}Se | H_{2}Te | H_{2}Po |
|---|---|---|---|---|---|
| Melting point (°C) | 0.0 | −85.6 | −65.7 | −51 | −35.3 |
| Boiling point (°C) | 100.0 | −60.3 | −41.3 | −4 | 36.1 |
| $\Delta H^\circ_f \left(\mathrm{kJ \cdot mol}^{-1}\right)$ | −285.9 | +20.1 | +73.0 | +99.6 | ? |
| Bond angle (H–X–H) (gas) | 104.45° | 92.1° | 91° | 90° | 90.9° (predicted) |
| Dissociation constant (HX^{−}, K_{1}) | 1.8 × 10^{−16} | 1.3 × 10^{−7} | 1.3 × 10^{−4} | 2.3 × 10^{−3} | ? |
| Dissociation constant (X^{2−}, K_{2}) | 0 | 7.1 × 10^{−15} | 1 × 10^{−11} | 1.6 × 10^{−11} | ? |

Comparison of the boiling points of the hydrogen chalcogenides and hydrogen halides; it can be seen that hydrogen fluoride similarly exhibits anomalous effects due to hydrogen bonding. Ammonia also misbehaves similarly.

Comparison of the melting (blue) and boiling (red) points of the hydrogen chalcogenides. The blue and red lines are least sqares fits for the non-oxygen chalcogenides, showing water should melt at −88 °C and boil at −75 °C.

Many of the anomalous properties of water compared to the rest of the hydrogen chalcogenides may be attributed to significant hydrogen bonding between hydrogen and oxygen atoms. Some of these properties are the high melting and boiling points (it is a liquid at room temperature), as well as the high dielectric constant and observable ionic dissociation. Hydrogen bonding in water also results in large values of heat and entropy of vaporisation, surface tension, and viscosity.

The other hydrogen chalcogenides are highly toxic, malodorous gases. Hydrogen sulfide occurs commonly in nature and its properties compared with water reveal a lack of any significant hydrogen bonding. Since they are both gases at STP, hydrogen can be simply burned in the presence of oxygen to form water in a highly exothermic reaction; such a test can be used in beginner chemistry to test for the gases produced by a reaction as hydrogen will burn with a pop. Water, hydrogen sulfide, and hydrogen selenide may be made by heating their constituent elements together above 350 °C, but hydrogen telluride and polonium hydride are not attainable by this method due to their thermal instability; hydrogen telluride decomposes in moisture, in light, and in temperatures above 0 °C. Polonium hydride is unstable, and due to the intense radioactivity of polonium (resulting in self-radiolysis upon formation), only trace quantities may be obtained by treating dilute hydrochloric acid with polonium-plated magnesium foil. Its properties are somewhat distinct from the rest of the hydrogen chalcogenides, since polonium is a metal while the other chalcogens are not, and hence this compound is intermediate between a normal hydrogen chalcogenide or hydrogen halide such as hydrogen chloride, and a metal hydride like stannane. Like water, the first of the group, polonium hydride is also a liquid at room temperature. Unlike water, however, the strong intermolecular attractions that cause the higher boiling point are van der Waals interactions, an effect of the large electron clouds of polonium.

== Dihydrogen dichalcogenides ==
Dihydrogen dichalcogenides have the chemical formula H_{2}X_{2}, and are generally less stable than the monochalcogenides, commonly decomposing into the monochalcogenide and the chalcogen involved.

The most important of these is hydrogen peroxide, H_{2}O_{2}, a pale blue, nearly colourless liquid that has a lower volatility than water and a higher density and viscosity. It is important chemically as it can be either oxidised or reduced in solutions of any pH, can readily form peroxometal complexes and peroxoacid complexes, as well as undergoing many proton acid/base reactions. In its less concentrated form hydrogen peroxide has some major household uses, such as a disinfectant or for bleaching hair; much more concentrated solutions are much more dangerous.

| Compound | Chemical formula | Bond length | Model |
|---|---|---|---|
| hydrogen peroxide (dioxidane) | H_{2}O_{2} | | |
| hydrogen disulfide (disulfane) | H_{2}S_{2} | | |
| hydrogen diselenide (diselane) | H_{2}Se_{2} | — | |
| hydrogen ditelluride (ditellane) | H_{2}Te_{2} | — | |

Some properties of the hydrogen dichalcogenides follow:

| Property | H_{2}O_{2} | H_{2}S_{2} | H_{2}Se_{2} | H_{2}Te_{2} |
|---|---|---|---|---|
| Melting point (°C) | −0.43 | −89.6 | ? | ? |
| Boiling point (°C) | 150.2 _{(decomposes)} | 70.7 | ? | ? |

An alternative structural isomer of the dichalcogenides, in which both hydrogen atoms are bonded to the same chalcogen atom, which is also bonded to the other chalcogen atom, have been examined computationally. These H_{2}X^{+}–X^{–} structures are ylides. This isomeric form of hydrogen peroxide, oxywater, has not been synthesized experimentally. The analogous isomer of hydrogen disulfide, thiosulfoxide, has been detected by mass spectrometry experiments.

It is possible for two different chalcogen atoms to share a dichalcogenide, as in hydrogen thioperoxide (H_{2}SO); more well-known compounds of similar description include sulfuric acid (H_{2}SO_{4}).

== Higher dihydrogen chalcogenides ==
All straight-chain hydrogen chalcogenides follow the formula H_{2}X_{n}.

Higher hydrogen polyoxides than H_{2}O_{2} are not stable. Trioxidane, with three oxygen atoms, is a transient unstable intermediate in several reactions. The next two in the oxygen series, tetraoxidane and pentaoxidane, have also been synthesized and found to be highly reactive. An alternative structural isomer of trioxidane, in which the two hydrogen atoms are attached to the central oxygen of the three-oxygen chain rather than one on each end, has been examined computationally.

Beyond H_{2}S and H_{2}S_{2}, many higher polysulfanes H_{2}S_{n} (n = 3–8) are known as stable compounds. They feature unbranched sulfur chains, reflecting sulfur's tendency for catenation. Starting with H_{2}S_{2}, all known polysulfanes are liquids at room temperature. H_{2}S_{2} is colourless while the other polysulfanes are yellow; the colour becomes richer as n increases, as do the density, viscosity, and boiling point. A table of physical properties is given below.

| Compound | Density at 20 °C (g·cm^{−3}) | Vapour pressure (mmHg) | Extrapolated boiling point (°C) |
|---|---|---|---|
| H_{2}S | 1.363 (g·dm^{−3}) | 1740 (kPa, 21 °C) | −60 |
| H_{2}S_{2} | 1.334 | 87.7 | 70 |
| H_{2}S_{3} | 1.491 | 1.4 | 170 |
| H_{2}S_{4} | 1.582 | 0.035 | 240 |
| H_{2}S_{5} | 1.644 | 0.0012 | 285 |
| H_{2}S_{6} | 1.688 | ? | ? |
| H_{2}S_{7} | 1.721 | ? | ? |
| H_{2}S_{8} | 1.747 | ? | ? |

However, they can easily be oxidised and are all thermally unstable, disproportionating readily to sulfur and hydrogen sulfide, a reaction for which alkali acts as a catalyst:

8 H_{2}S_{n} → 8 H_{2}S + (n − 1) S_{8}

They also react with sulfite and cyanide to produce thiosulfate and thiocyanate respectively.

An alternative structural isomer of the trisulfide, in which the two hydrogen atoms are attached to the central sulfur of the three-sulfur chain rather than one on each end, has been examined computationally. Thiosulfurous acid, a branched isomer of the tetrasulfide, in which the fourth sulfur is bonded to the central sulfur of a linear dihydrogen trisulfide structure ((HS)_{2}S^{+}−S^{−}), has also been examined computationally. Thiosulfuric acid, in which two sulfur atoms branch off of the central of a linear dihydrogen trisulfide structure has been studied computationally as well.

Higher polonium hydrides may exist.

== Other hydrogen-chalcogen compounds ==
Heavy water

Some monohydrogen chalcogenide compounds do exist and others have been studied theoretically. As radical compounds, they are quite unstable. The two simplest are hydroxyl (HO) and hydroperoxyl (HO_{2}). The compound hydrogen ozonide (HO_{3}) is also known, along with some of its alkali metal ozonide salts are (various MO_{3}). The respective sulfur analogue for hydroxyl is sulfanyl (HS) and HS_{2} for hydroperoxyl.

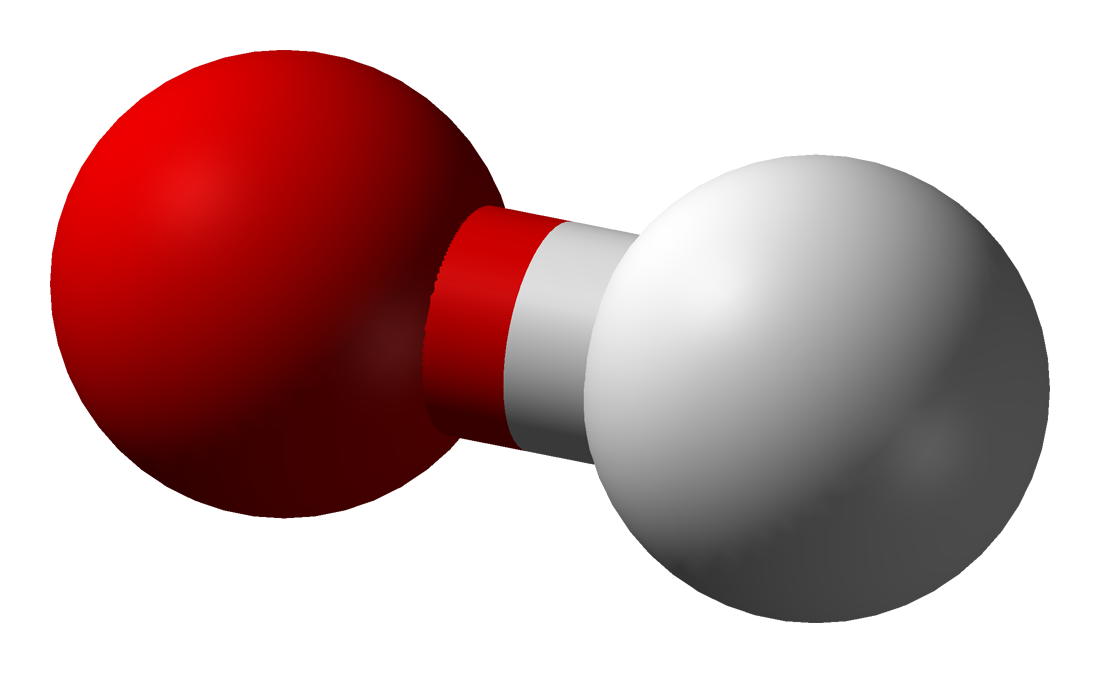
HO^{−}

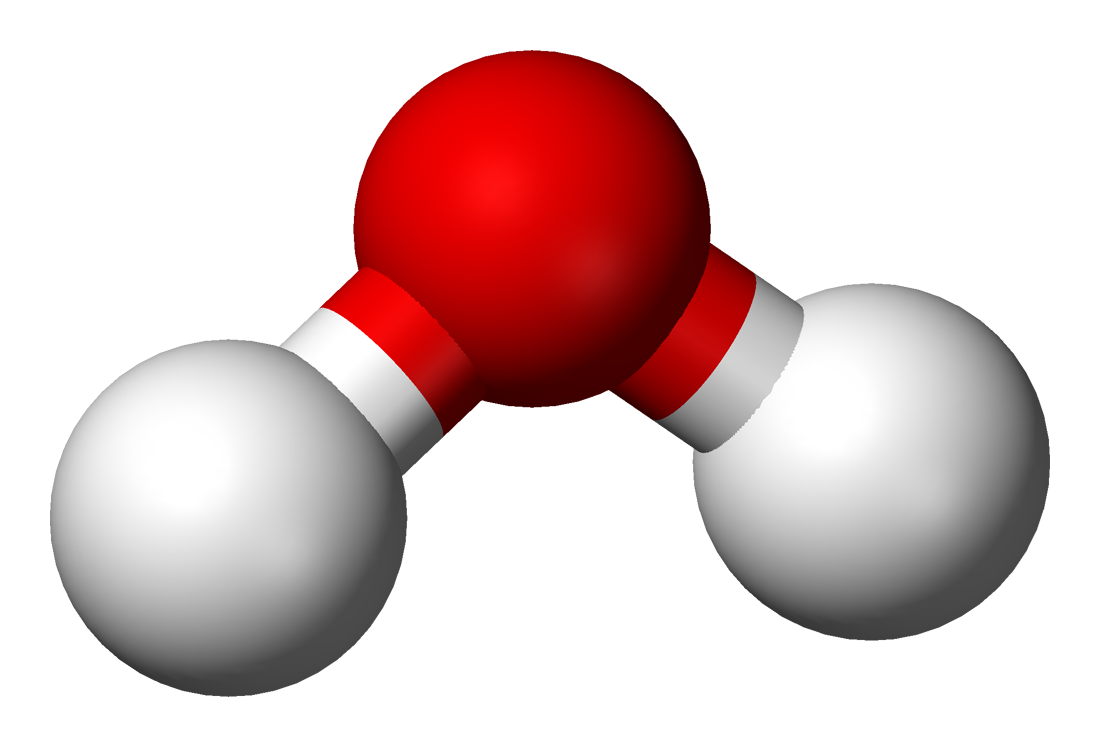
H_{2}O

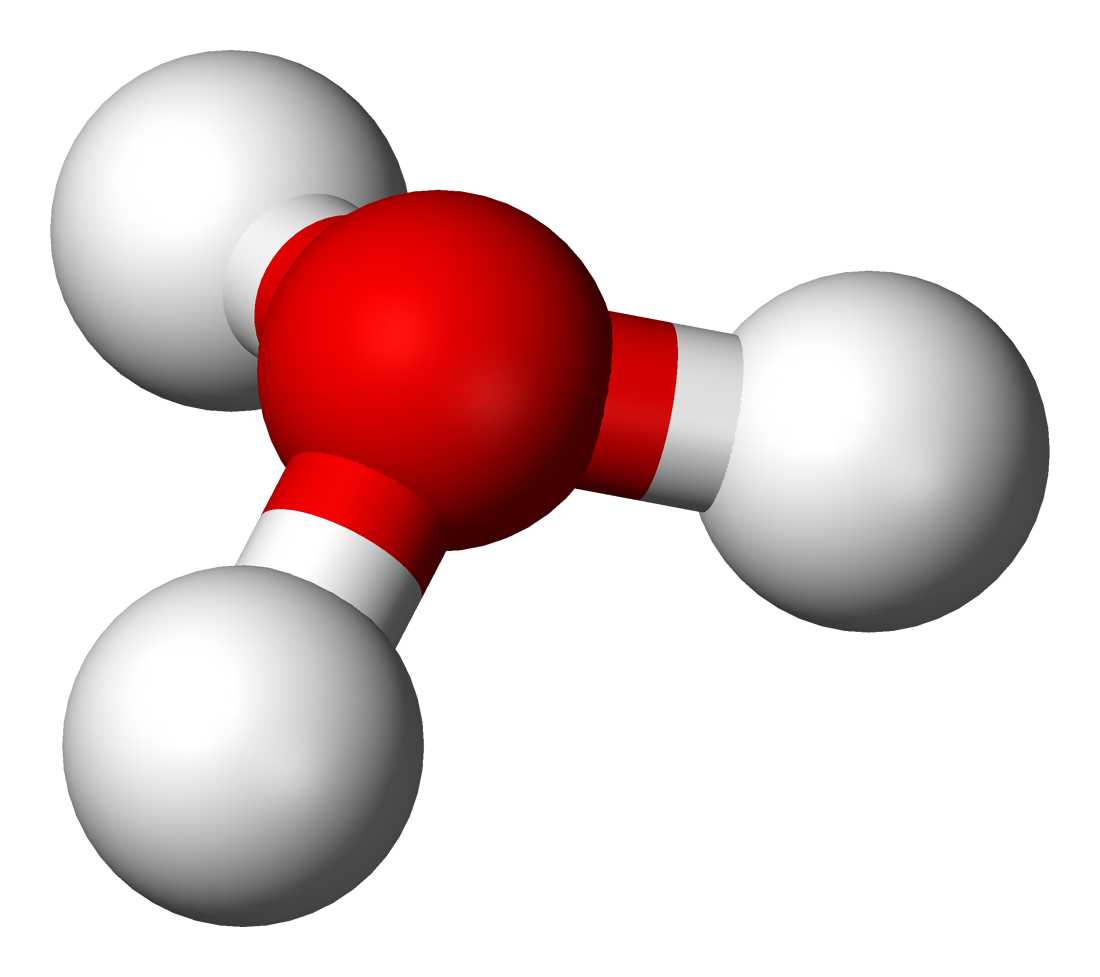
H_{3}O^{+}

One or both of the protium atoms in water can be substituted with the isotope deuterium, yielding respectively semiheavy water and heavy water, the latter being one of the most famous deuterium compounds. Due to the high difference in density between deuterium and regular protium, heavy water exhibits many anomalous properties. The radioisotope tritium can also form tritiated water in much the same way. Another notable deuterium chalcogenide is deuterium disulfide. Deuterium telluride (D_{2}Te) has slightly higher thermal stability than protium telluride, and has been used experimentally for chemical deposition methods of telluride-based thin films.

Hydrogen shares many properties with the halogens; substituting the hydrogen with halogens can result in chalcogen halide compounds such as oxygen difluoride and dichlorine monoxide, alongside ones that may be impossible with hydrogen such as chlorine dioxide.

=== Hydrogen Ions ===
One of the most well-known hydrogen chalcogenide ions is the hydroxide ion, and the related hydroxy functional group. The former is present in alkali metal, alkaline earth, and rare-earth hydroxides, formed by reacting the respective metal with water. The hydroxy group appears commonly in organic chemistry, such as within alcohols. The related bisulfide/sulfhydryl group appears in hydrosulfide salts and thiols, respectively.

The hydronium (H_{3}O^{+}) ion is present in aqueous acidic solutions, including the hydrochalcogenic acids themselves, as well as pure water alongside hydroxide.

== Bibliography ==
- Greenwood, Norman N.; Earnshaw, Alan (1997). Chemistry of the Elements (2nd ed.). Butterworth-Heinemann. doi:10.1016/C2009-0-30414-6. ISBN 978-0-08-037941-8.
