= Hydroselenide =

Identifiers
| 3D model (JSmol) | Interactive image |
| ChEBI | CHEBI:29317 |
| ChemSpider | 4402037 |
| Gmelin Reference | 773467 |
| PubChem CID | 5232483 |
| CompTox Dashboard (EPA) | DTXSID901344864 |
- InChI: InChI=1S/H2Se/h1H2/p-1 Key: SPVXKVOXSXTJOY-UHFFFAOYSA-M
- SMILES: [SeH-]

Properties
| Chemical formula | HSe^{−} |
| Molar mass | 79.980 g·mol^{−1} |
- Except where otherwise noted, data are given for materials in their standard state (at 25 °C [77 °F], 100 kPa). Infobox references

A hydroselenide (or biselenide or selanide) is an ion or chemical compound containing the [SeH]^{−} ion. The radical HSe is a pseudohalogen. Hydroselenide can be a ligand in transition metal complexes where it can be attached to a single atom, or bridge two atoms. The terms used in ligand naming are selanido, or hydrogenselenido.

Similar compounds include the hydrosulfides, and hydrotellurides. Related compounds include toxic hydrogen selenide gas, hydrodiselenides (HSeSe^{−}) and the hydride selenides that do not have a bond between hydrogen and selenium.

== Production ==
HSe^{−} complexes may be formed by reacting H_{2}Se with a reduced metal complex, forming a hydrido-hyrogenselenido complex. A halide ligand in a complex may be replaced by HSe^{−} from sodium hydroselenide.

A metal-metal bond can be replaced by a selenium bridge, that can then be protonated to yield a bridged complex.

== Properties ==
Hydroselenides easily react with water or water vapour to produce the malodourous hydrogen selenide.

Hydroselenide occurs naturally in alkaline, oxygen-free waters.

== Use ==
Hydroselenides have been used to introduce selenium into organic compounds, such as replacing a methylsufide group with selenium.

== List ==
| | formula | system | space group | unit cell Å | volume | density | comment | reference |
|---|---|---|---|---|---|---|---|---|
| ammonium hydroselenide | [NH_{4}]SeH | | | | | | at 24.8°C pressure=14 mm Hg | |
| ethylmethylimidazolinium hydroselenide | [(C_{2}H_{5})(CH_{3})C_{3}N_{2}H_{2}]^{+}SeH^{−} | monoclinic | P2_{1}/n | | | | melt 102°C | |
| N-butyl-N-methylpyrollidinium hydroselenide | [(C_{4}H_{9})(CH_{3})C4NH_{8}]^{+}SeH^{−} | | | | | | decompose 149°C; slightly greenish | |
| sodium hydroselenide | NaSeH | cubic | Fm3̅m | a=6.26 Z=4 | 245.3 | | pale grey; water insensitive | |
| (tris(Hydrogen 3-p-tolylpyrazolyl)borato)-hydroselenato-magnesium | [Tp^{p-Tol}]MgSeH | monoclinic | P2_{1}/n | a=10.870 b=17.015 c=15.907 β=96.39° | | | | |
| | LiAlHSeH | | | | | | grey | |
| ^{Me}L=HC[(CMe)N(2,4,6-Me_{3}C_{6}H_{2})]_{2}^{–} | [^{Me}LAl(μ-SeH)]_{2}(μ-Se) | | | | | | pale yellow; melt 190°C | |
| ^{Me}L=HC[(CMe)N(2,4,6-Me_{3}C_{6}H_{2})]_{2}^{–} | [^{Me}LAl(μ-SeH)]_{2}(μ-O)•2CH_{3}C_{6}H_{5} | orthorhombic | Pccn | a=21.111 b=13.118 c=20.256 Z=4 | 5610 | 1.280 | white; decompose 140°C | |
| b-diketimi-nato | N(2,6-iPr_{2}C_{6}H_{3})C(Me)CHC(Me)N(2,6-iPr_{2}C_{6}H_{3})Al(SeH)_{2} | orthorhombic | Pnma | a=13.065 b=22.049 c=10.55.7 Z=4 | 3047 | 1.318 | yellow; decompose 220°C; dimerizes | |
| | N(2,6-iPr_{2}C_{6}H_{3})C(Me)CHC(Me)N(2,6-iPr_{2}C_{6}H_{3})(HSe)AlSeAl(SeH)N(2,6-iPr_{2}C_{6}H_{3})C(Me)CHC(Me)N(2,6-iPr_{2}C_{6}H_{3}) | monoclinic | P2_{1}/n | a=12.255 b=27.347 c=17.753 β=98.29° Z=4 | 5888 | 1.273 | pale yellow; decompose 250°C | |
| tri-n-butyl-methylphosphinium hydroselenide | [(C_{4}H_{9})_{3}(CH_{3})P]^{+}SeH^{−} | | | | | | melt 57°C | |
| | KSeH | cubic | Fm3̅m | a=6.87 Z=4 | 324.2 | | | |
| Cp*=(CH_{3})_{5}(C_{5}H_{5}) | Cp*_{2}Ti(SeH)_{2} | | | | | | | |
| | (C_{5}H_{5})_{2}Ti(SeH)_{2} | | | | | | | |
| | (C_{5}H_{5})_{2}TiCl(SeH) | | | | | | | |
| | PPN[Cr(CO)_{5}SeH] | | | | | | yellow; decompose 94°C | |
| | PPN[(CO)_{5}Cr]_{2}(μ-SeH) | | | | | | | |
| | Fe_{2}(CO)_{6}(μ_{2}-SeH)_{2} | | | | | | | |
| | [(C_{5}H_{5})Co]2(μ-P(CH_{3})_{2})_{2}(μ-SeH)•PF_{6} | | | | | | red-brown | |
| | dppeNi(SeH)_{2} | | | | | | | |
| | RbSeH | cubic | Fm3̅m | a=7.16 Z=4 | 331.4 | | | |
| Cp* = η^{5}-C_{5}Me_{5} | [(Cp*RhCl)_{2}(μ-SeH)_{2}] | orthorhombic | Pccn | a=13.512 b=20.435 c=8.660 | | | red | |
| | (CH_{2}CH_{2}PPh_{2})_{3}PRhSeH | hexagonal | P6_{3} | a=13.573 c=12.188 Z=2 | | | | |
| | (CH_{2}CH_{2}PPh_{2})_{3}PRh(SeH){H)CF_{3}SO_{3} | | | | | | | |
| | CsSeH | cubic | Fm3̅m | a=4.437 Z=1 | 87.4 | | | |
| | Cp*_{2}Ta(Se)SeH | | | | | | | |
| | AsPh_{4}[(CO)_{5}W]_{2}(μ-SeH) | | | | | | | |
| | Re_{2}(CO)_{8}(μ_{2}-SeH)_{2} | | | | | | air sensitive | |
| | trans-Pt(PEt_{3})_{2}(SeH)_{2} | | | | | | yellow; air sensitive | |
| | trans-Pt(PEt_{3})_{2}(SeH)_{2}(H)_{2} | | | | | | | |
| | trans-Pt(PEt_{3})_{2}(SeH)H | | | | | | white; melt 135°C; air sensitive | |
| | PtH(SeH)(PPh_{3})_{2} | | | | | | air stable;melt 135°C | |
| | Pt(PEt_{3})_{2}(SeH)Cl(H)_{2} | | | | | | | |
| | Pt(PEt_{3})_{2}(SeH)Br(H)_{2} | | | | | | | |
| | Pt(PEt_{3})_{2}(SeH)I(H)_{2} | | | | | | | |
| | IrCl(CO)(PPh_{3})_{2}(SeH)(H) | | | | | | air sensitive; decompose >160°C | |
| Cp* = η^{5}-C_{5}Me_{5} | [(Cp*IrCl)_{2}(μ-SeH)_{2}] | | | | | | yellow | |
| | (t-BuC_{5}H_{4})_{2}Nb(η^{2}-Te_{2})H | | | | | | dark orange | |
| (^{Ad}ArO)_{3}N^{3−} = tris(2-hydroxy-3-adamantyl-5-methylbenzyl)amine) | [((^{Ad}ArO)_{3}N)U(CH_{3}OC_{2}H_{4}OCH_{3})(SeH)] | | | | | | | |
| | {((^{Ad}ArO)_{3}N)U}_{2}(μ-SeH)_{2} | | | | | | | |
| (4,7,13,16,21,24-hexaoxa-1,10-diazabicyclo[8.8.8]hexacosane)-potassium selenido-{2,2',2''-[(1,4,7-triazonane-1,4,7-triyl)tris(methylene)]tris[4-methyl-6-(tricyclo[3.3.1.1^{3,7}]decan-1-yl)phenolato]}-uranium | ((^{Ad,Me}ArO)_{3}tacn)U(SeH) | hexagonal | P6_{3} | a=14.920 c=19.254 Z=2 | 3711.9 | 1.451 | brown | |
