= Tellurocyanate =

Identifiers
CAS Number	25928-34-1
3D model (JSmol)	Interactive image
ChEBI	CHEBI:36837
ChemSpider	21865273
Gmelin Reference	217394
- InChI: InChI=1S/CHNTe/c2-1-3/h3H/p-1 Key: FSSLLCCLSQEQDK-UHFFFAOYSA-M
- SMILES: C(#N)[Te-]

Properties
Chemical formula	CNTe^{−}
Molar mass	153.62 g·mol^{−1}

Related compounds
Related compounds	selenocyanate; thiocyanate; cyanate
- Except where otherwise noted, data are given for materials in their standard state (at 25 °C [77 °F], 100 kPa). Infobox references

Tellurocyanate is the polyatomic ion [TeCN]^{−}, consisting of a tellurium atom bonded to a cyanide group. Chemical compounds which contain the group -TeCN are known as tellurocyanates. The tellurocyanate ion is the heaviest out of the chalcogenocyanate ions, as a polonium cyanate ion has never been synthesized.

Jöns Jacob Berzelius, in 1845, observed the formation of a homogeneous mass when potassium cyanide and elemental tellurium were melted together, but the formation of a potassium tellurocyanate was not confirmed. The existence of the tellurocyanate ion was debated, but in 1968, A. W. Downs isolated tetraethylammonium tellurocyanate, and the first unambiguous crystallographic characterization of the tellurocyanate anion was achieved by crystallizing its bis(triphenylphosphine)iminium salt.

[TeCN]^{−} is classified as a pseudohalogen, similarly to its lighter congeners cyanate, thiocyanate, and selenocyanate. Due to the instability of the C-Te bond, tellurocyanate chemistry has seen scarce exploration. The ion itself is notably sensitive to environmental factors, and is prone to decomposition. Tellurocyanate salts can be synthesized by adding elemental tellurium to a cyanide compound. Many organic tellurocyanates exist, such as benzyl tellurocyanate, and alkali metal tellurocyanate salts such as potassium tellurocyanate are also characterized.

Tellurocyanate compounds can be used in the synthesis of other organotellurium compounds. The tellurocyanate anion is the conjugate base of tellurocyanic acid.

== Discovery ==
In 1845, Jöns Jacob Berzelius oversaw the formation of a homogeneous mass when potassium cyanide and elemental tellurium were melted together, but no experimental evidence was given to see if the resulting compound was a tellurocyanate salt. Extraction with water led to decomposition as tellurium precipitated out and potassium cyanide was dissolved. Other attempts to isolate the tellurocyanate ion or its salts ended in failure.

In 1968, tetraethylammonium tellurocyanate was isolated by A. W. Downs as the first manageable tellurocyanate. It was prepared from the reaction of tetraethylammonium cyanide with elemental tellurium in DMF; pale yellow crystals that were highly moisture and oxygen sensitive were isolated. The first unambiguous crystallographic characterization of the anion was achieved by crystallizing its [PPN]^{+} salt; the study confirmed that the anion was linear.

== Properties ==
The tellurocyanate ion's properties have not seen extensive exploration due to the instability of the C-Te bond. The ion exhibits extreme sensitivity to environmental factors that must be accounted for to produce and isolate salts of the anion, or else the tellurocyanate anion will decompose and precipitate out elemental tellurium.

The bond length of C-N is 1.150(6)Å, and the bond length between C-Te is 2.051(4)Å; the former bond length shows character of a C-N triple bond and the C-Te bond has contributions of single and double bond character. The anion itself is linear, and, as measured in the [K@crypt-222][TeCN] salt, the bond angle of the tellurocyanate anion is 179.2(4)°. The electron affinity of the neutral [TeCN]• molecule is determined to be 3.034(5) eV. The tellurocyanate anion is classified as a pseudohalogen, a class of polyatomic ions that exhibit behavior analogous to halogens and halides.

=== Stability ===
The tellurocyanate ion is notably sensitive to its environment, and the stability of its solid salts is highly dependent on the cation. The tellurocyanate ion cannot exist in a solid form in the presence of strongly polarizing cations like potassium or caesium, and it is only isolated in the presence of large non-polarizing cations like the tetraethylammonium ion or the tetraphenylarsonium ion. The tetraphenylarsonium salt in particular demonstrated reasonable stability during storage; as long as the salt was properly dried, it could be stored for months in a closed container even in direct sunlight without substantial decomposition.

In solution, the tellurocyanate ion is also prone to decomposition. Dilute solutions of the ion are generally more stable when compared to more concentrated solutions, which can release elemental tellurium when exposed to anti-solvents or rapid removal of the solvent. When solutions of tellurocyanate salts are exposed to air, they react readily with oxygen, and tellurium dioxide is precipitated. Dry salts, however, are more stable to oxygen. The tellurocyanate ion and its salts immediately decompose in water and other protic solvents like alcohols, but both the ion and its salts are generally more stable in DMF, DMSO, acetone, or acetonitrile.

== Production ==
The tellurocyanate ion can be isolated in situ by a reaction between dry DMSO, potassium cyanide, and elemental tellurium powder. This produces a stable solution of potassium tellurocyanate in DMSO, where benzyl bromide can then be added to produce benzyl tellurocyanate. After dissolving the precipitated benzyl tellurocyanate in a suitable solution, sodium borohydride is added as a reducing agent to cleave the C-Te bond, and the resulting solution contains the in situ generated tellurocyanate ion.

=== Salts ===
Name	Formula	Crystal system	Space group	Unit cell (Å)	volume (Å^{3})	Density (g/cm^{3})	Comment	Reference
Potassium Tellurocyanate	KTeCN	Monoclinic	P2_{1}/c	No. 14 a= 11.7362(5) b= 14.3520(5) c= 14.9300(7) β= 92.161(4)° Z= 4			Pure [KTeCN] has never been isolated. Tellurocyanate salts with potassium include [K@crypt-222][TeCN] and [K(18-crown-6)]^{+}[TeCN]^{−} . Data comes from recorded data for [K@crypt-222][TeCN].	
Benzyl Tellurocyanate	C₆H₅CH₂TeCN	Monoclinic	P 1 21/c 1	a= 6.031 b= 16.042 c= 8.787 α= 90° β= 95.82° γ= 90° Z= 4			Melting point is either 126-127 °C or 53-54°C. Appears as white needles.	
Bis(triphenylphosphine)iminium Tellurocyanate	((C_{6}H_{5})_{3}P)_{2}NTeCN							
Tetraethylammonium Tellurocyanate	(CH_{3}CH_{2})_{4}NTeCN							
Tetraphenylarsonium Tellurocyanate	(C_{6}H_{5})_{4}AsTeCN							

== Applications ==
Tellurocyanate compounds and salts can be used to produce other organotellurium compounds for a variety of purposes. KTeCN, for example, can react with organic halides to form organotellurocyanates, which can then be used to make other organotellurium compounds.
