= Jean Baptiste Saint-Lager =

French botanist and physician (1825–1912)

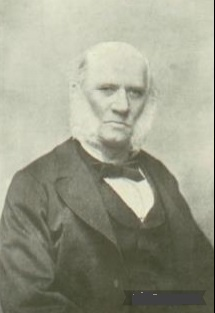
- Jean Baptiste Saint-Lager
- Born: 4 December 1825; Lyon, France
- Died: 29 December 1912 (aged 87)
- Education: Faculté de Médecine de Lyon
- Scientific career
- Fields: botanist and physician
- Author abbrev. (botany): St.-Lag.

Jean Baptiste Saint-Lager, born in 1825 in Lyon and died in 1912, was a French botanist and physician. In June 1881, he was made a member of the Academy of Sciences, Belles-Lettres and Arts of Lyon (Académie des sciences, belles-lettres et arts de Lyon).

== Background ==
Little is known of Saint-Lager's early life. Jean Baptiste Saint-Lager began practising medicine in Lyon, after successfully concluding his studies at the Lyon School of Medicine in 1847. In 1850 he worked as a doctor of medicine at the University of Paris, where he remained in this profession for twelve years. In 1862, he began travelling to make collections for his research on both botanical and medical topics, during which time he devoted himself to scientific studies.

In his pursuit of academia, he was greatly influenced by Gaspard Adolphe Chatin (1813–1901), who laid the foundation for the modern hydrotelluric theory of iodine deficiency, based on the knowledge of iodine's biological cycle. Although Chatin's findings were disputed by scholars representing the biological conservatism of the times, Jean Baptiste Saint-Lager supported Chatin's views and wrote a careful review of 43 different pathogenetic theories of goitre.

In Saint-Lager's study of herbaria, he dealt primarily with the process of nomenclature (phytonymy) and of plant taxonomy.

Jean Baptiste Saint-Lager is recognized as being one of the founders of the Lyon Botanical Society (Société botanique de Lyon) and served as librarian for that society, as well as for the Linnean Society of Lyon until 1911.

== Selected published works ==
- Saint-Lager, Jean Baptiste (1880). "Réforme de la Nomenclature botanique". Annales de la Société botanique de Lyon (in French). 7 (1). Lyon: 1–154. doi:10.3406/linly.1880.17005. ISSN 1160-6436. OCLC 7291022956.
- Saint-Lager, Jean Baptiste (2020). Nouvelles remarques sur la nomenclature botanique (in French). Lyon: Bibliothèque Lyon. OCLC 1176459529. (originally published in 1881)
- Saint-Lager, Jean Baptiste (1882). "Origines des Sciences naturelles, suivies de Considérations sur la nomenclature zoologique". Annales de la Société botanique de Lyon (in French). Lyon: Gallica. pp. 132–ff. ISBN 9780428310394. OCLC 1356388279.
- Saint-Lager, Jean Baptiste (1995). Catalogue des plantes vasculaires de la flora du bassin du Rhône (in French). Leiden: Inter Documentation Company. OCLC 1123479669. (originally published over the course of 10 years, 1873–1883 - OCLC 555392200)
- Saint-Lager, Jean Baptiste (1883). Quel est l'inventeur de la nomenclature binaire : remarques historiques (in French). Paris: J.-B. Baillière. OCLC 13978750.
- Saint-Lager, Jean Baptiste (1883–84). "Remarques historiques sur les mots plantes mâles et plantes femelles". Annales de la société botanique de Lyon (in French). 11: 1–48. doi:10.3406/linly.1884.4814. ISSN 1160-6436. OCLC 7325431058.
- Saint-Lager, Jean Baptiste (1885). Histoire des herbiers (in French). Paris: J.-B. Baillière et fils. OCLC 458872124.
- Saint-Lager, Jean Baptiste (1886). "Recherches sur les anciens herbaria". Annales de la société botanique de Lyon (in French). 13. Lyon: 233–257. OCLC 13429443.
- Saint-Lager, Jean Baptiste (1886). Le procès de la nomenclature botanique et zoologique (in French). Paris: J.-B. Baillière. OCLC 903504213.
- Saint-Lager, Jean Baptiste (1891). La guerre des nymphes; suivie de, La nouvelle incarnation de Buda (in French). Paris: J.-B. Baillière. OCLC 12177641.
- Saint-Lager, Jean Baptiste (1893). Les anes et le vin (in French). Paris: J.-B. Baillière et fils. OCLC 229477270.

== Bibliography ==
- Barale, George (2017). "SAINT-LAGER Jean-Baptiste". In Dominique Saint-Pierre (ed.). Historical Dictionary of the Academicians of Lyon 1700-2016. Lyon: Éditions de l'Académie (4, rue Adolphe Max, 69005 Lyon). ISBN 978-2-9559433-0-4. OCLC 983829759.; ISBN 2-9559433-0-4
- Bruyn, G.W.; Poser, Charles M. (2003). The History of Tropical Neurology: Nutritional Disorders. Canton, MA: Science History Publications. p. 51. ISBN 9780881352818. OCLC 52895298.
