= Protonated ozone =

Names
- IUPAC name Hydroxy(oxo)oxidanium
- Systematic IUPAC name Hydrotrioxygen(1+)

Identifiers
CAS Number	74241-49-9
3D model (JSmol)	Interactive image
PubChem CID	6030661
- InChI: InChI=1S/HO3/c1-3-2/h1H/q+1 Key: FQWSHTCXTQFHJZ-UHFFFAOYSA-N
- SMILES: O[O+]=O

Properties
Chemical formula	HO_{3}^{+}
Molar mass	49.004 g·mol^{−1}
Conjugate base	Ozone

Related compounds
Related hydrogen polyoxides	Hydrogen trioxide; Hydrogen ozonide
- Except where otherwise noted, data are given for materials in their standard state (at 25 °C [77 °F], 100 kPa). Infobox references

Protonated ozone is a hydrogen polyoxide having the molecular formula HO^{+}_{3} (also written O_{3}H^{+}). It is a cationic structure consisting of an ozone unit with a hydrogen atom attached to one end. This substance is proposed to exist as an intermediate in several interstellar, atmospheric, and synthetic chemical processes. It has been synthesized in mass spectrometer experiments by protonation of ozone using various strong acids. Related experiments have used it as the precursor for generating hydrogen ozonide.
