= Hydrogen polyoxide =

Chemical compound

Chemical structure of water, the simplest hydrogen polyoxide

Hydrogen polyoxides (also known as oxidanes, oxohydrogens, or oxyhydrogens) are chemical compounds that consist only of hydrogen and oxygen atoms, are bonded exclusively by single bonds (i.e., they are saturated), and are acyclic (have molecular structures containing no rings). They can therefore be classed as hydrogen chalcogenides.

The simplest possible stable hydrogen polyoxide (the parent molecule) is water, H_{2}O. The general structure of the class of molecules is some number of oxygen atoms single-bonded to each other in a chain. The oxygen atom at each end of this oxygen skeleton is attached to a hydrogen atom. Thus, these compounds form a homologous series with chemical formula H_{2}O_{n} in which the members differ by a constant relative molecular mass of 16 (the mass of each additional oxygen atom). The number of oxygen atoms is used to define the size of the hydrogen polyoxide (e.g., hydrogen pentoxide contains a five-oxygen backbone).

An oxidanyl group is a functional group or side-chain analog of hydrogen polyoxide that is attached to some structure other than just a hydrogen atom. Examples include the hydroxy (oxidyl) and hydroperoxy (dioxidanyl) groups.

== Specific examples ==
=== HO_{n} ===
Several molecules are known where one end of the polyoxide chain is protonated and the other is an unprotonated radical:

- Hydroxyl (HO^{•})
- Hydroperoxyl (HOO^{•}), the protonated form of superoxide
- Hydrogen ozonide (HOOO^{•}), the protonated form of ozonide

=== H_{2}O_{n} ===
Neutral dihydrogen polyoxides containing up to five oxygen atoms have been produced experimentally.

- Water (H_{2}O) is the most common hydrogen polyoxide, occurring widely on Earth's surface.
- Hydrogen peroxide (H_{2}O_{2}) is a common disinfectant and readily decomposes to form water and oxygen.
- Trioxidane (H_{2}O_{3}) is rare and readily decomposes into water and singlet oxygen.
- Tetraoxidane (H_{2}O_{4}) has been synthesized by reaction among peroxy radicals at low temperature.
- Pentaoxidane (H_{2}O_{5}) is a byproduct of trioxidane production and has also been synthesized by reaction among peroxy radicals at low temperature.

Hydrogen polyoxides containing up to 10 oxygen atoms have been studied theoretically, but those containing more than five oxygens are expected to be extremely unstable.

=== H_{3}O_{n} ===
- Trihydrogen oxide (H_{3}O), which has been studied theoretically and is expected to be stable at pressures over a few hundred gigapascals.

== Ionization ==
All the hydrogen polyoxides are known or expected to autoionise when in liquid form, with the acidic hydrogen being solvated by other of the neutral polyoxide molecules.

H_{2}O_{n} ⇌ H^{+} + HO^{–}_{n}
2 H_{2}O_{n} ⇌ H_{3}O^{+}_{n} + HO^{–}_{n}

The ions can also be formed by protonation or deprotonation of various neutral hydrogen polyoxide by suitably strong other acids or bases. Specific ions include:

- Hydroxide (HO^{–})
- Hydronium (H_{3}O^{+})
- Protonated ozone (HO_{3}^{+})

== See also ==
- Polysulfanes, the sulfur analogs of hydrogen polyoxides
- Polysulfides, the conjugate bases of polysulfanes, or compounds formally derived from them
- Peroxides, compounds formally derived from hydrogen peroxide
