= Aluminium selenide =

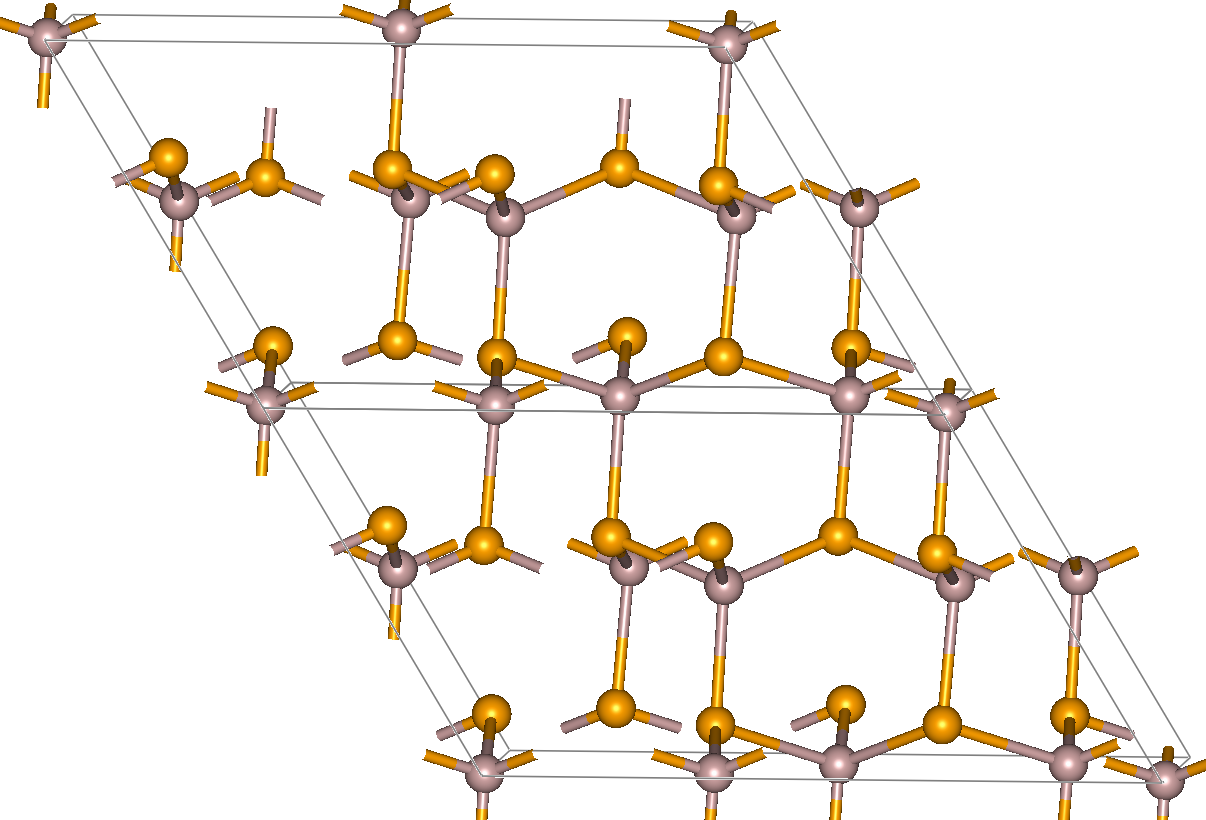
- Aluminum selenide

Names
- Other names Aluminium(III) selenide

Identifiers
CAS Number	1302-82-5
3D model (JSmol)	Interactive image
ChemSpider	144477
ECHA InfoCard	100.013.737
EC Number	215-110-6
PubChem CID	164804
UNII	4R7PMP996Q
CompTox Dashboard (EPA)	DTXSID80894848
- InChI: InChI=1S/2Al.3Se/q2*+3;3*-2 Key: CYRGZAAAWQRSMF-UHFFFAOYSA-N; InChI=1/2Al.3Se/q2*+3;3*-2 Key: CYRGZAAAWQRSMF-UHFFFAOYAJ
- SMILES: [Al+3].[Al+3].[Se-2].[Se-2].[Se-2]

Properties
Chemical formula	Al_{2}Se_{3}
Molar mass	290.84 g/mol
Appearance	yellow to brown powder
Odor	odorless
Density	3.437 g/cm^{3}
Melting point	947 °C (1,737 °F; 1,220 K)
Solubility in water	decomposes

Structure
Crystal structure	Monoclinic, mS20, Space group Cc, No. 9

Thermochemistry
Std molar entropy (S^{⦵}_{298})	154.8 J/mol K
Std enthalpy of formation (Δ_{f}H^{⦵}_{298})	-566.9 kJ/mol

Hazards
- GHS labelling
Pictograms	(GHS06: Toxic) (GHS08: Health hazard) (GHS09: Environmental hazard)
Signal word	Danger
Hazard statements	H301, H331, H373, H410
Precautionary statements	P260, P264, P270, P271, P273, P301+P310, P304+P340, P311, P314, P321, P330, P391, P403+P233, P405, P501
NFPA 704 (fire diamond)	3 0 3
- Except where otherwise noted, data are given for materials in their standard state (at 25 °C [77 °F], 100 kPa). verify (what is ?) Infobox references

Aluminium selenide is the inorganic compound with the formula Al_{2}Se_{3}.

== Preparation ==
It is a solid prepared by igniting a mixture of the elements at 1,000 °C (1,830 °F):

2 Al + 3 Se → Al_{2}Se_{3}

The pure compound is white, but typical samples are coloured. Samples are usually protected from moisture, because they hydrolyze readily, giving off highly toxic hydrogen selenide gas:

Al_{2}Se_{3} + 3 H_{2}O → Al_{2}O_{3} + 3 H_{2}Se

== Use ==
Al_{2}Se_{3} has been used as a precursor to hydrogen selenide, which is released when the solid is treated with acids.
