= Dicyanamide =

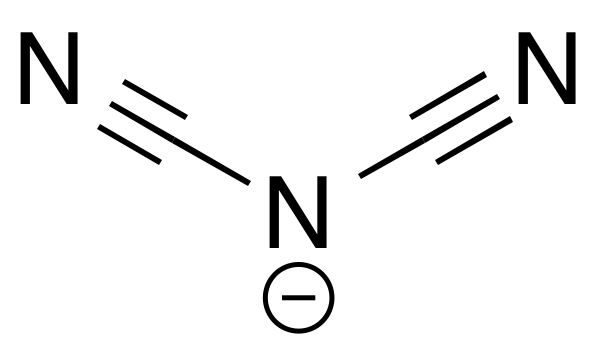
- Structure of dicyanamide

Identifiers
3D model (JSmol)	Interactive image
ChemSpider	3786559
PubChem CID	4594639
- InChI: InChI=1S/C2N3/c3-1-5-2-4/q-1 Key: UKDLHLAPDXIAID-UHFFFAOYSA-N
- SMILES: C(=[N-])=NC#N

Properties
Chemical formula	C_{2}N_{3}^{−}
Molar mass	66.044 g·mol^{−1}
Conjugate acid	Dicyanamine (Hdca)
- Except where otherwise noted, data are given for materials in their standard state (at 25 °C [77 °F], 100 kPa). Infobox references

Dicyanamide (abbreviated as dca when a ligand) is an anion with the formula C_{2}N^{−}_{3}. It contains two cyanide groups bound to a central nitrogen anion. Dicyanamide is formed by decomposition of 2-cyanoguanidine.

Dicyanamide is used extensively as a counterion of organic and inorganic salts, as it is a "chemically inert, hydrophobic anion" and pseudohalide. It is also as a reactant for the synthesis of various covalent organic structures.

Dicyanamide has a very low proton affinity, less than 310 ± 3 kcal·mol^{−1}. Its gas-phase conjugate acid is iminomethylidenecyanamide HN=C=N−C≡N, which is predicted to be slightly more stable than the symmetric tautomer dicyanimide N≡C−NH−C≡N.

Dicyanamide was used as an anionic component in an organic superconductor that was, when reported in 1990, a superconductor with the highest transition temperature in its structural class.

Dean Kenyon examined the role of this chemical in reactions that can produce peptides, and a co-worker examined dicyanamide's possible role in primordial biogenesis.
