= Hydrotelluride =

Names
- Other names tellanide

Identifiers
3D model (JSmol)	Interactive image
ChEBI	CHEBI:30460
ChemSpider	19241428
Gmelin Reference	1407875
- InChI: InChI=1S/H2Te/h1H2/p-1; Key: VTLHPSMQDDEFRU-UHFFFAOYSA-M
- SMILES: [Te-][H]

Properties
Chemical formula	HTe^{−}
Molar mass	128.61 g·mol^{−1}
- Except where otherwise noted, data are given for materials in their standard state (at 25 °C [77 °F], 100 kPa). Infobox references

A hydrotelluride or tellanide is an ion or a chemical compound containing the [HTe]^{−} anion which has a hydrogen atom connected to a tellurium atom. HTe is a pseudohalogen. Organic compounds containing the -TeH group are called tellurols. "Tellanide" is the proper name according to the International Union of Pure and Applied Chemistry's Red Book, but hydrogen(tellanide)(1−) is also listed. "Tellanido" as a ligand is not named in the Red Book itself, but "tellanido" and "hydrogentellurido" are listed in the contemporaneous Principles of Chemical Nomenclature:A Guide to IUPAC Recommendations. For the group -HTe or radical HTe^{•} the term tellanyl is used.

Hydrotellurides are usually unstable at room temperature.

== List ==
	formula	system	space group	unit cell Å	volume	density	comment	reference
ammonium hydrotelluride Decomposes at room temperature over a fortnight; 116c.	NH_{4}TeH						at 25 °C pressure = 22.7 mmHg, decomposing to H_{3}N and H_{2}Te then to Te and H_{2}	
ethylmethylimidazolinium hydrotelluride	[(C_{2}H_{5})(CH_{3})C_{3}N_{2}H_{2}]^{+}TeH^{−}							
N-butyl-N-methylpyrollidinium hydrotelluride	[(C_{4}H_{9})(CH_{3})C_{4}NH_{8}]^{+}TeH^{−}						decompose at room temperature over a fortnight; decompose 116 °C	
sodium hydrotelluride	NaTeH							
tri-n-butyl-methylphosphonium hydrotelluride	[(C_{4}H_{9})_{3}(CH_{3})P]^{+}TeH^{−}						red; decompose 163 °C	
tetraphenylphosphonium hydrotelluride	Ph_{4}PTeH							
	[(C_{5}H_{5})Co]_{2}(μ-P(CH_{3})_{2})_{2}(μ-TeH)•PF_{6}						red-brown	
	Na[(CO)_{5}Cr(TeH)]							
	[(Ph_{3}P)_{2}N]^{+}[(CO)_{5}Cr(TeH)]^{−}							
	[(Ph_{3}P)_{2}N]^{+}[(CO)_{5}Cr(TeH)Cr(CO)_{5}]^{−}							
	[CpCr(CO)_{3}]_{2}(μ-TeH)							
	[(CO)_{4}Mn(TeH)]_{2}							
Cp*=C_{5}Me_{5}	Cp*_{2}Zr(TeH){η^{1}-OC(Ph)=CH_{2}}							
	(t-BuC_{5}H_{4})_{2}Nb(η^{2}-Te_{2})H						dark orange	
	(η-C_{5}H_{4}Me)Ru(PPh_{3})_{2}(TeH)							
	(CH_{2}CH_{2}PPh_{2})_{3}PRhTeH	hexagonal	P6_{3}	a=13.542 c=12.346 Z=2			cherry red; decomposed by light	
	(CH_{2}CH_{2}PPh_{2})_{3}PRh(TeH)(H)CF_{3}SO_{3}							
	(MeCp)_{2}Ta(TeH)CO							
	(MeCp)_{2}Ta(TeH) (η^{2}-COTe)							
	Na[(CO)_{5}W(TeH)]							
	Ph_{4}As[(CO)_{5}W(TeH)]							
	Ph_{4}As[(CO)_{5}W(TeH)W(CO)_{5}]							
	Cp*Re(CO)_{2}(H)(TeH)	monoclinic	P2_{1}/m	a=7.467 b=13.208 c=7.570 β=99.48° Z=2		2.287	red-brown	
(^{Ad}ArO)_{3}N^{3−} = tris(2-hydroxy-3-adamantyl-5-methylbenzyl)amine)	[((^{Ad}ArO)_{3}N)U(CH_{3}OC_{2}H_{4}OCH_{3})(TeH)]						stable to 80 °C; U–Te bond length 3.122 Å	
	{((^{Ad}ArO)_{3}N)U}_{2}(μ-TeH)_{2}							
