= Sodium hydroselenide =

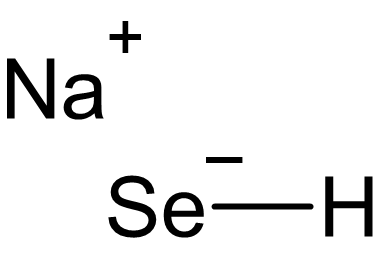

Names
- IUPAC name Sodium hydroselenide
- Other names Sodium biselenide

Identifiers
CAS Number	12195-50-5
3D model (JSmol)	Interactive image
ChemSpider	67024398
PubChem CID	129628184
- InChI: InChI=1S/Na.H2Se/h;1H2/q+1;/p-1 Key: RBRLCUAPGJEAOP-UHFFFAOYSA-M
- SMILES: [Na+].[SeH-]

Properties
Chemical formula	NaSeH
Molar mass	102.969 g·mol^{−1}
- Except where otherwise noted, data are given for materials in their standard state (at 25 °C [77 °F], 100 kPa). Infobox references

Sodium hydroselenide is an inorganic compound with the chemical formula NaSeH. It is a salt of hydrogen selenide. It consists of sodium cations Na^{+} and hydroselenide anions ^{−}SeH. Each unit consists of one sodium, one selenium, and one hydrogen atom. Sodium hydroselenide is a selenium analog of sodium hydroxide NaOH.

== Production ==
Sodium hydroselenide can be made by reducing selenium with sodium borohydride:

Se + Na[BH_{4}] → NaSeH + BH_{3}(g)

Alternatively it can be made from sodium ethoxide exposed to hydrogen selenide:

CH_{3}CH_{2}O^{−}Na^{+} + H_{2}Se → NaSeH + CH_{3}CH_{2}OH

Sodium hydroselenide is not made for storage, instead it is used immediately after production in a fume hood thanks to the appalling odour of hydrogen selenide.

== Properties ==
Sodium hydroselenide dissolves in water or ethanol. In humid air sodium hydroselenide is changed to sodium polyselenide and elemental selenium.

Sodium hydroselenide is slightly reducing.

== Use ==
In organic synthesis, hydrogen sodium hydroselenide is a nucleophillic agent for insertion of selenium.
