= Telluroxide =

A telluroxide is a type of organotellurium compound with the formula R_{2}TeO. These compounds are analogous to sulfoxides in some respects. Reflecting the decreased tendency of Te to form multiple bonds, telluroxides exist both the monomer and the polymer, which are favored in solution and the solid state, respectively:

(R_{2}TeO)_{n} ⇌ n R_{2}TeO

Telluroxides are prepared from the telluroethers by halogenation followed by base hydrolysis:

R_{2}Te + Br_{2} → R_{2}TeBr_{2}
R_{2}TeBr_{2} + 2 NaOH → R_{2}TeO + 2 NaBr + H_{2}O
