= Pentaoxidane =

Names
- IUPAC name Pentaoxidane
- Other names Hydrogen pentoxide, dihydrogen pentoxide

Identifiers
3D model (JSmol)	Interactive image
PubChem CID	16122616
- InChI: InChI=1S/H2O5/c1-3-5-4-2/h1-2H Key: KUGRPPRAQNPSQD-UHFFFAOYSA-N
- SMILES: OOOOO

Properties
Chemical formula	H_{2}O_{5}
Molar mass	82.011 g·mol^{−1}

Related compounds
Related compounds	Water; Hydrogen peroxide; Trioxidane; Tetraoxidane
- Except where otherwise noted, data are given for materials in their standard state (at 25 °C [77 °F], 100 kPa). Infobox references

Pentaoxidane is an inorganic compound of hydrogen and oxygen with the chemical formula H_{2}O_{5}. This is one of the most unstable hydrogen polyoxides.

== Synthesis ==
- The compound is prepared as a byproduct of trioxidane production.
- H_{2}O_{5} has also been synthesized by reaction among peroxy radicals at low temperature.
