= Trihydrogen oxide =

Names
- Other names Trihydrogen monoxide, trihydrogenoxygen

Identifiers
CAS Number	12168-76-2
3D model (JSmol)	Interactive image; Interactive image
PubChem CID	76541350
- InChI: InChI=1S/H3O/h1H3 Key: JEMMGECATLJXLJ-UHFFFAOYSA-N; InChI=1S/2H2O.H2/h2*1H2;1H Key: HPCCIZFARGGUQF-UHFFFAOYSA-N
- SMILES: [OH3]; [HH].O.O

Properties
Chemical formula	H_{3}O
Molar mass	19.023 g·mol^{−1}

Related compounds
Related compounds	water
- Except where otherwise noted, data are given for materials in their standard state (at 25 °C [77 °F], 100 kPa). Infobox references

Trihydrogen oxide is a predicted inorganic compound of hydrogen and oxygen with the chemical formula H_{3}O. This hypothetical compound would be one of the unstable hydrogen polyoxides. It is hypothesized that the compound could constitute a thin layer of metallic liquid around the cores of Uranus and Neptune, and that this could be the source of their magnetic fields. Calculations indicate the stability of H_{3}O in solid, superionic, and fluid metallic states at the deep interior conditions of these planets.

== Synthesis ==
Trihydrogen oxide has not been observed experimentally as of 2023, but its existence has been predicted computationally using the CALYPSO crystal-structure prediction method. The compound should be stable in the pressure range 450–600 GPa and could be produced by the reaction

2H_{2}O + H_{2} → 2H_{3}O

== Physical properties ==
The compound is considered not a true molecular trihydrogen oxide compound. Instead, each oxygen atom is linked by a strong (covalent) bond to only two hydrogen atoms, as a water molecule, and there are molecules of dihydrogen inserted in the voids of the water molecules network. Structurally, it is thus a 2(H_{2}O)·H_{2} stoichiometric combination.

At 600 GPa and 7000 K, the compound density is calculated to be 4.3 g/cm^{3}. Molecular dynamics simulations were carried out at constant density for different temperatures:

- At 1000 K, H_{3}O is an orthorhombic crystalline solid (space group Cmca).
- At 1250 K, this solid passes into a superionic state.
- The compound liquefies at 5250 K, and the liquid should have metallic-like electrical conductivity.

== In the Solar System ==
The magnetic fields of both Uranus and Neptune are special—non-dipolar and non-axisymmetric. This fact can be explained if the magnetic fields are produced by dynamo effect within a sufficiently thin conductive layer. However, the origin of the fields is still problematic because the cores of these planets are probably solid (thus too rigid), and the thick mantles of ice are too poorly conductive to create the effect.
