= Hydrogen disulfide =

Chemical compound

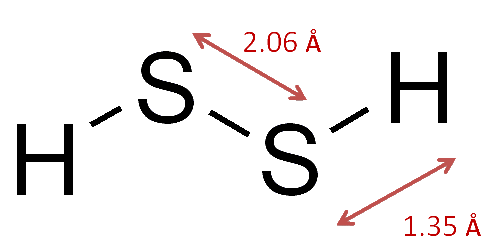

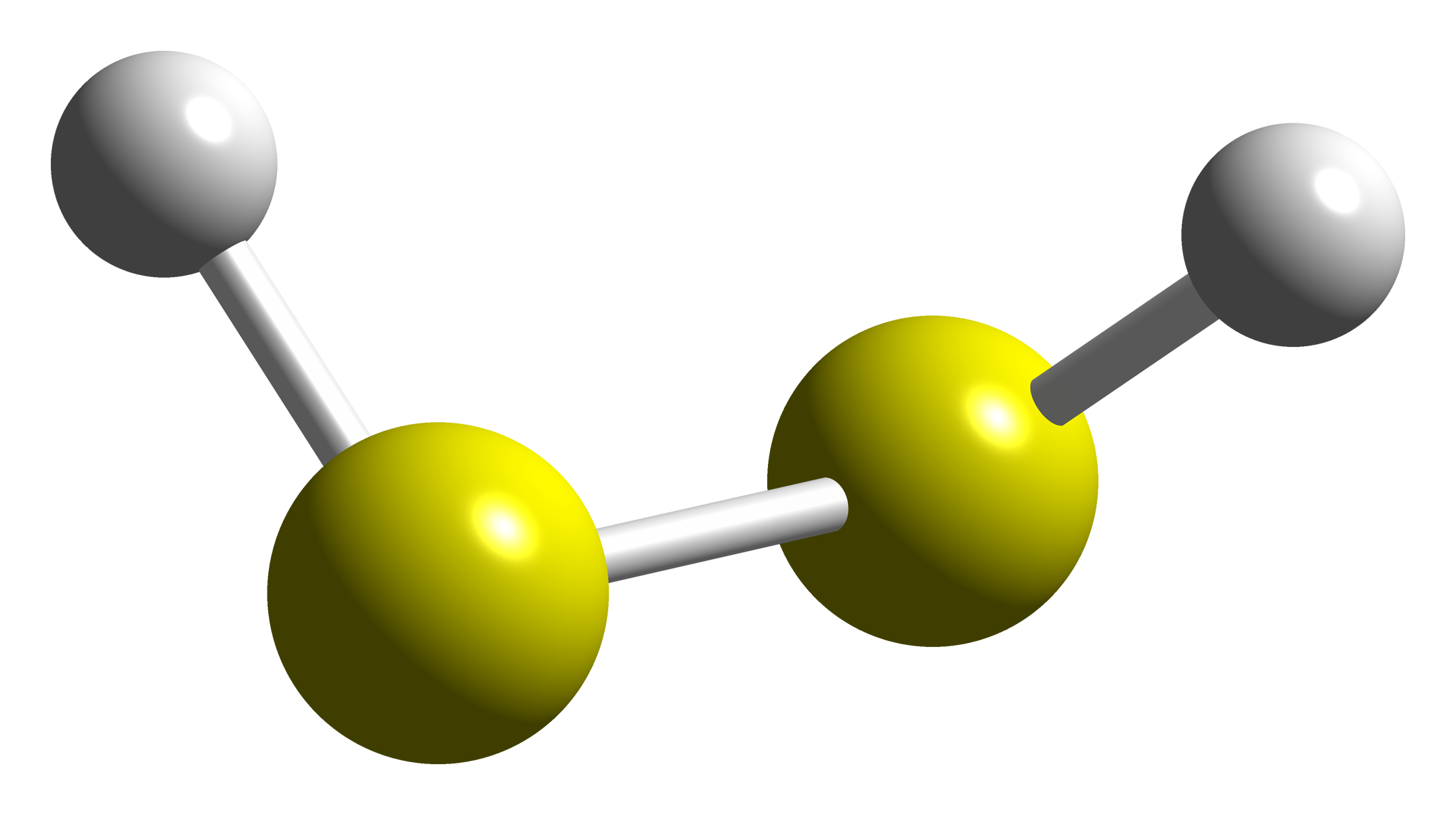
- Sulfur, S; Hydrogen, H

Names
- IUPAC name Dihydrogen disulfide
- Systematic IUPAC name Disulfane
- Other names: Dithioperoxol; Hydrogen disulphide; Hydrogen persulfide; Hydrogen persulphide; Thiosulfenic acid

Identifiers
CAS Number	13465-07-1
3D model (JSmol)	Interactive image
ChEBI	CHEBI:33114
ChemSpider	97274
PubChem CID	108196
CompTox Dashboard (EPA)	DTXSID10158844
- InChI: InChI=1S/H2S2/c1-2/h1-2H Key: BWGNESOTFCXPMA-UHFFFAOYSA-N; InChI=1/H2S2/c1-2/h1-2H Key: BWGNESOTFCXPMA-UHFFFAOYAV
- SMILES: SS

Properties
Chemical formula	H_{2}S_{2}
Molar mass	66.14 g·mol^{−1}
Appearance	Pale yellow liquid
Density	1.334 g/cm^{3}
Melting point	−89.6 °C (−129.3 °F; 183.6 K)
Boiling point	70.7 °C (159.3 °F; 343.8 K)

Hazards
Flash point	flammable

Related compounds
Related compounds	Hydrogen sulfide; Hydrogen peroxide; Hydrogen thioperoxide; Hydrogen diselenide; Hydrogen ditelluride; Disulfur dichloride
- Except where otherwise noted, data are given for materials in their standard state (at 25 °C [77 °F], 100 kPa). verify (what is ?) Infobox references

Hydrogen disulfide is the inorganic compound with the formula H_{2}S_{2}. This hydrogen chalcogenide is a pale yellow volatile liquid with a camphor-like odor. It decomposes readily to hydrogen sulfide (H_{2}S) and elemental sulfur.

== Structure ==
The connection of atoms in the hydrogen disulfide molecule is H−S−S−H. The structure of hydrogen disulfide is similar to that of hydrogen peroxide, with C_{2} point group symmetry. Both molecules are distinctly nonplanar. The dihedral angle between the H^{a}−S−S and S−S−H^{b} planes is 90.6°, compared with 111.5° in H_{2}O_{2}. The H−S−S bond angle is 92°, close to 90° for unhybridized divalent sulfur.

== Synthesis ==
Hydrogen disulfide can be synthesised by cracking polysulfanes (H_{2}S_{n}) according to this idealized equation:

H_{2}S_{n} → H_{2}S_{2} + S_{n−2}

The main impurity is trisulfane (H_{2}S_{3}). The precursor polysulfane is produced by the reaction of hydrochloric acid with aqueous sodium polysulfide. The polysulfane precipitates as an oil.

== Reactions ==
Upon contact with water or alcohols, hydrogen disulfide readily decomposes under ambient conditions to hydrogen sulfide and sulfur.

It is more acidic than hydrogen sulfide, but the pK_{a} has not been reported.

H_{2}S_{2} may be considered a simple inorganic hydropersulfide, capable of transferring a sulfanyl group onto a thiol in the same fashion as organic hydropersulfides. Na_{2}S_{2} is commonly used as a reagent for persulfidation of proteins via in situ formation of H_{2}S_{2}.

In organosulfur chemistry, hydrogen disulfide adds to alkenes to give disulfides and thiols.

== Quantum tunneling and its suppression in deuterium disulfide ==
The deuterated form of hydrogen disulfide, deuterium disulfide D−S−S−D (dideuterodisulfane), has a similar geometry to H−S−S−H, but its tunneling time is slower, making it a convenient test case for the quantum Zeno effect, in which frequent observation of a quantum system suppresses its normal evolution. Trost and Hornberger have calculated that while an isolated D−S−S−D molecule would spontaneously oscillate between left and right chiral forms with a period of 5.6 milliseconds, the presence of a small amount of inert helium gas should stabilize the chiral states, the collisions of the helium atoms in effect "observing" the molecule's momentary chirality and so suppressing spontaneous evolution to the other chiral state.

== Health effects ==
In high concentrations, it can cause dizziness, disorientation and ultimately unconsciousness.

== Historic literature ==
- Walton, James H.; Parsons, Llewellyn B. (1921-12-01). "Preparation and Properties of the Persulfides of Hydrogen". J. Am. Chem. Soc. 43 (12): 2539–48. doi:10.1021/ja01445a008.
- Georg Brauer: Handbook of Preparative Inorganic Chemistry Volume I, page 391, Wiley, 1963.
- von Richter, Victor: Translated by Edgar F Smith, "A Text-Book of Inorganic Chemistry", Page 111, P. Blakiston, Son & Co., 1893
