= Tellurol =

Class of chemical compounds

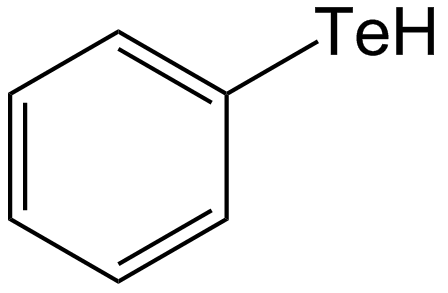
Benzenetellurol: an example of a tellurol compound

Tellurols are analogues of alcohols and phenols where tellurium replaces oxygen. Tellurols, selenols, and thiols have similar properties, but tellurols are the least stable. Although they are fundamental representatives of organotellurium compounds, tellurols are lightly studied because of their instability. Tellurol derivatives include telluroesters (RC(O)TeR') and tellurocyanates (RTeCN).

== Properties ==
Alkyltellurols are colorless liquids with strong odors. Samples usually appear yellowish owing to the presence of dialkylditelluride impurities. Near room temperature, methanetellurol degrades with loss of elemental tellurium. It is reported to ignite in air.

Aryltellurols are more robust and have been obtained as colorless crystals. Some of the most stable tellurols are the bulky silylated derivatives of tris(trimethylsilyl)methane and analogues. One series of readily isolable tellurols is (Me_{3}Si)_{3}CTeH, (Me_{3}Si)_{3}SiTeH, and (Me_{3}Si)_{3}GeTeH.

=== Acid–base properties ===
The acidity of tellurols can be inferred by the acidity and dissociation constant of hydrogen telluride, H_{2}Te, which has a (first) pK_{a} of 2.64 corresponding to a dissociation constant of 2.3 × 10^{−3}. H_{2}Te has a lower pK_{a} and higher dissociation constant than H_{2}S and H_{2}Se. The pKa is 9.3 for (Me_{3}Si)_{3}CTeH vs 10.8 for (Me_{3}Si)_{3}CSeH.

The absence of hydrogen-bonding explains the low boiling temperature of tellurols.

== Preparation ==
The first tellurol to be synthesized, ethanetellurol, was prepared in 1926 via the Grignard reagent. The most frequently used method involves reduction of the ditellurides (R_{2}Te_{2}).
