= Tetraoxidane =

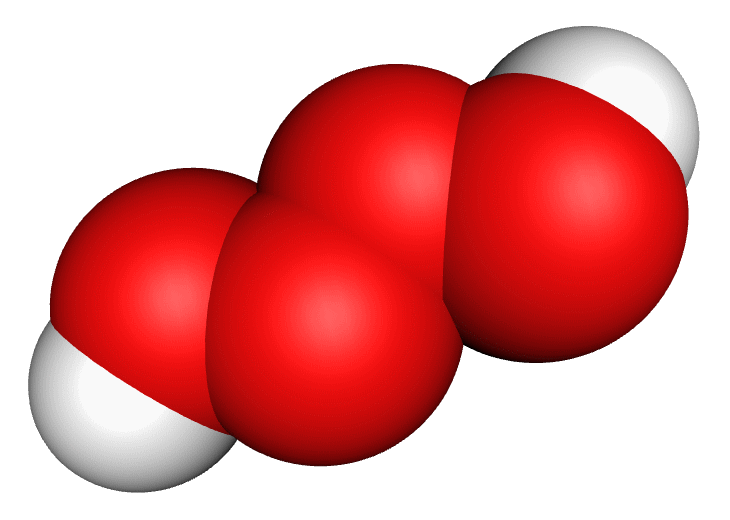

Names
- IUPAC name Tetraoxidane
- Other names Hydroxyperoxide, dihydrogen tetroxide, diperoxide, bisperoxide

Identifiers
CAS Number	29683-94-1
3D model (JSmol)	Interactive image
ChemSpider	4417295
PubChem CID	5250043
- InChI: InChI=1S/H2O4/c1-3-4-2/h1-2H Key: RSPISYXLHRIGJD-UHFFFAOYSA-N
- SMILES: OOOO

Properties
Chemical formula	H_{2}O_{4}
Molar mass	66.012 g·mol^{−1}
Density	1.8±0.1 g/cm^{3}

Related compounds
Related compounds	Water; Hydrogen peroxide; Trioxidane; Pentaoxidane
- Except where otherwise noted, data are given for materials in their standard state (at 25 °C [77 °F], 100 kPa). Infobox references

Tetraoxidane is an inorganic compound of hydrogen and oxygen with the chemical formula H_{2}O_{4}. This is one of the unstable hydrogen polyoxides.

== Synthesis ==
The compound is prepared by a chemical reaction between hydroperoxyl radicals (HOO•) at low temperatures:

2 HOO• ⇌ H_{2}O_{4}

== Physical properties ==
This is the fourth member of the polyoxidanes. The first three are water (oxidane), hydrogen peroxide (dioxidane), and trioxidane. Tetraoxidane is more unstable than the previous compounds. The term "tetraoxidane" extends beyond the parent compound to several daughter compounds of the general formula R_{2}O_{4}, where R can be hydrogen, halogen, or various inorganic and organic monovalent radicals. The two Rs together can be replaced by a divalent radical, so heterocyclic tetraoxidanes also exist.

== Ionization ==
Tetraoxidane autoionizes when in liquid form:

H_{2}O_{4} ⇌ H^{+} + HO^{−}_{4}
2 H_{2}O_{4} ⇌ H_{3}O^{+}_{4} + HO^{−}_{4}

== See also ==
- Hydrogen polyoxide
