= Hydrogen ozonide =

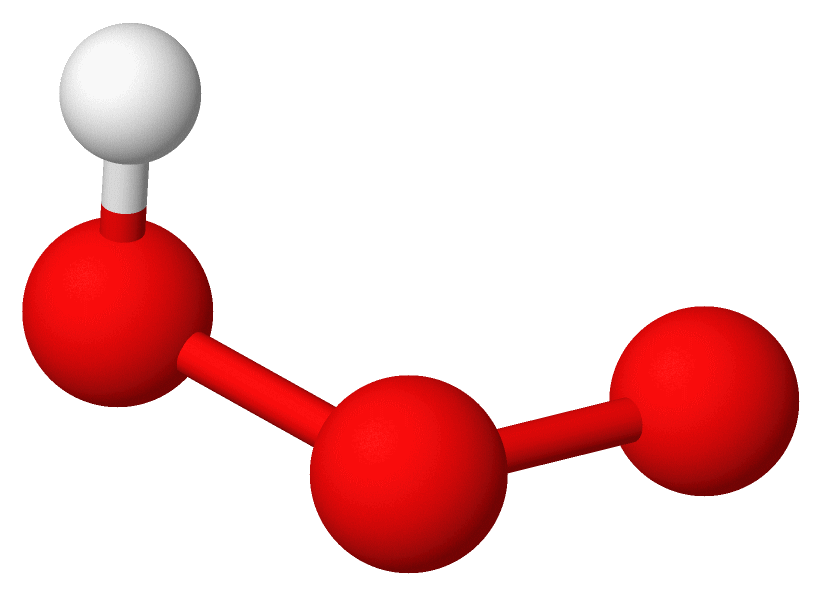

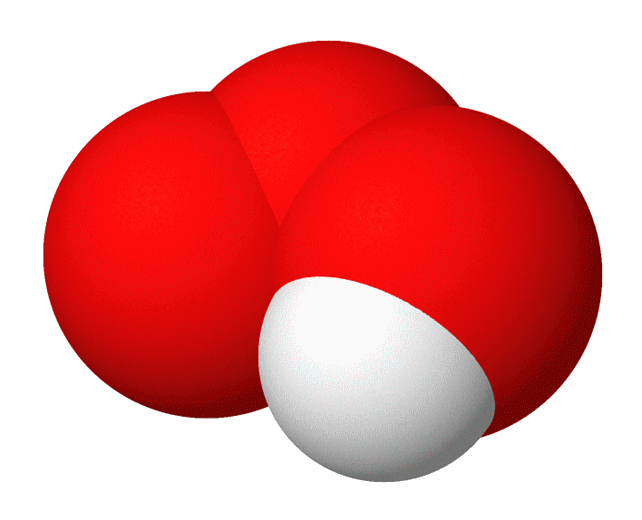

Names
- IUPAC name Hydrogen ozonide
- Other names: Trioxidanyl; Hydridotrioxygen

Identifiers
| 3D model (JSmol) | Interactive image |
| ChEBI | CHEBI:29411 |
| ChemSpider | 5257003 |
| Gmelin Reference | 662585 |
| PubChem CID | 6857668 |
- InChI: InChI=1S/HO3/c1-3-2/h1H Key: WURFKUQACINBSI-UHFFFAOYSA-N
- SMILES: OO[O]

Properties
| Chemical formula | HO_{3} |
| Molar mass | 49.005 g·mol^{−1} |
| Conjugate base | ozonide |

Related compounds
| Related hydrogen polyoxides | Hydrogen trioxide; Hydrogen superoxide |
| Related compounds | Protonated ozone |
- Except where otherwise noted, data are given for materials in their standard state (at 25 °C [77 °F], 100 kPa). Infobox references

Hydrogen ozonide (HO_{3}) is a radical molecule consisting of a hydrogen atom covalently bonded to an ozonide unit.

It is possibly produced in the reaction of the hydroxyl radical with dioxygen: OH^{•} + O_{2} → HO_{3}^{•}.

It has been detected in a mass spectrometer experiment using HO^{+}_{3} (protonated ozone) as precursor.

== Extra reading ==
- Kalemos, Apostolos (1 February 2021). "Some ab initio thoughts on the bonding in O_{3}H". Molecular Physics. 119 (3) e1804082. doi:10.1080/00268976.2020.1804082. S2CID 225486457.
- Fabian, W. M. F.; Kalcher, J.; Janoschek, R. (September 2005). "Stationary points on the energy hypersurface of the reaction O_{3} + H•→ [•O_{3}H]* ⇆ O_{2} + •OH and thermodynamic functions of •O_{3}H at G3MP2B3, CCSD(T)–CBS (W1U) and MR–ACPF–CBS levels of theory". Theoretical Chemistry Accounts. 114 (1–3): 182–188. doi:10.1007/s00214-005-0659-7. S2CID 100482298.
