= Hydrogen thioperoxide =

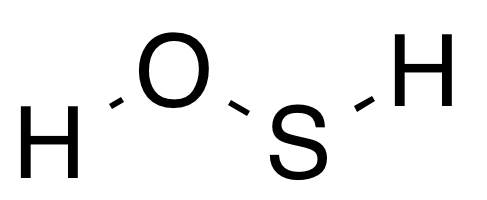

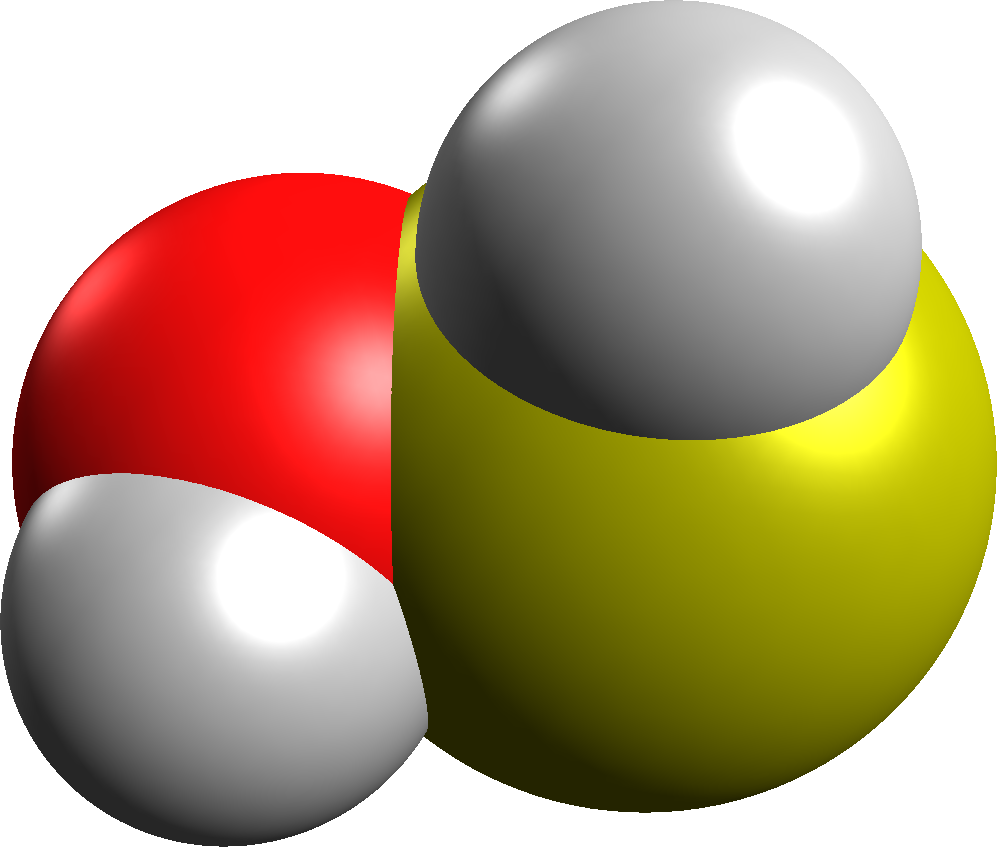

Names
- IUPAC name Sulfenic acid
- Systematic IUPAC name Thioperoxol
- Other names Sulfenic acid oxadisulfane Sulfur hydride hydroxide Sulfonol; Sulfanol

Identifiers
CAS Number	62607-44-7
3D model (JSmol)	Interactive image
ChEBI	CHEBI:37858
ChemSpider	394637
Gmelin Reference	672
PubChem CID	447587
RTECS number	WP4100000
CompTox Dashboard (EPA)	DTXSID801033872
- InChI: InChI=1S/H2OS/c1-2/h1-2H Key: RVEZZJVBDQCTEF-UHFFFAOYSA-N
- SMILES: OS

Properties
Chemical formula	H_{2}OS
Molar mass	50.08 g·mol^{−1}
Density	1.249
Refractive index (n_{D})	1.484

Related compounds
Related compounds	Hydrogen peroxide HOOH; Hydrogen disulfide HSSH; Hydroxylamine NH_{2}OH; Sulfoxylic acid HOSOH; 1-oxatrisulfane HSSOH; thiooxonium ylide H_{2}OS
- Except where otherwise noted, data are given for materials in their standard state (at 25 °C [77 °F], 100 kPa). Infobox references

Hydrogen thioperoxide, also called oxadisulfane or sulfanol, is the chemical with the structure H–S–O–H. It can be considered as the simple sulfur-substituted analog of the common hydrogen peroxide (H–O–O–H) chemical, and as the simplest hydrogen chalcogenide containing more than one type of chalcogen. The chemical has been described as the "missing link" between hydrogen peroxide and hydrogen disulfide (H–S–S–H), though it is substantially less stable than either of the other two. It is the inorganic parent structure of the sulfenic acid class of organic compounds (R–S–O–H) and also the oxadisulfide linkage (R^{1}–S–O–R^{2}), where "R" is any organic structure. Sulfur is present in oxidation state 0.

== Formation ==
Hydrogen thioperoxide has been synthesized in labs by photolysis of a mixture of ozone and hydrogen sulfide frozen in argon at 8 K and by pyrolysis of di-tert-butyl sulfoxide. Yet another synthesis is by an electric discharge through water and sulfur.

In the interstellar medium there is a hypothesis that hydrogen thioperoxide is formed in a reaction of sulfur monoxide with the trihydrogen cation, dihydrogen and an electron. Another possible route is sulfur monoxide reacting with atomic hydrogen to form HOS and HSO which in turn can add another hydrogen atom. However this mechanism probably needs a dust grain to take away excess energy.

== Properties ==
Hydrogen thioperoxide molecules have a gauche conformation. They are asymmetrical, but have a low barrier to convert from left-hand to right-hand forms, so that the molecule can tunnel between the forms.

The measurements of the bond-lengths in hydrogen thioperoxide are H–S 1.3420 Å, S–O 1.6616 Å, O–H 0.9606 Å. The bond angles are H–S–O 98.57°, S–O–H 107.19°. The H–S and O–H bonds are twisted at 90.41°.

The half-life of hydrogen thioperoxide in water is 40 minutes, much longer than the expected half-life of less than seconds for a sulfenic acid. In the gas phase at high temperature and low pressure, it has a lifetime on the order of 5 seconds. Its decomposition products include disulfur monoxide and molecular hydrogen.

== Reactions ==
Two molecules of hydrogen thioperoxide can undergo cyclocondensation to form sulfinothioic acid HS(=O)SH and water.

Hydrosulfide HS^{−} can react with HSOH to yield disulfane HSSH.
