= Organotellurium chemistry =

Organotellurium chemistry describes the synthesis and properties of organotellurium compounds, chemical compounds containing a carbon-tellurium chemical bond. Organotellurium chemistry is a lightly studied area, in part because of it having few applications.

== Functional groups ==
The tellurium analogues of common organosulfur and organoselenium functional groups are known. Tellurols are however unstable with respect to oxidation to the ditellurides. Commonly encountered organotellurium compounds are diorganomono- and ditellurides, R_{2}Te and (RTe)_{2}, respectively. Two other families of organotellurium(IV) compounds are well developed: R_{4−x}TeCl_{x} and the telluroxides (R_{2}TeO).

== Synthesis and reactions ==
=== Reduced organotellurium compounds ===
Reduced organotellurium compounds are commonly obtained from NaHTe and lithium telluride:

Li_{2}Te + 2 RBr → R_{2}Te + 2 LiBr

A direct route to organolithium compounds starts from reactions of organolithium or Grignard reagents and Te:

Te + ArLi → ArTeLi

Butyl lithium gives the telluride similarly:

Te + BuLi → BuTeLi

Organotelluride anions can be oxidized or alkylated:

2 RTeLi + 0.5 O_{2} + H_{2}O → RTeTeR + 2 LiOH
RTeLi + R'Br → RTeR' + LiBr

Diorganoditellurides are valued intermediates, especially the aryl derivatives such as diphenyl ditelluride:

Ar_{2}Te_{2} + RLi → RTeAr + LiTeR
Ph_{2}Te_{2} + 2 Li → 2 LiTePh

=== Derivatives of TeCl_{4} ===
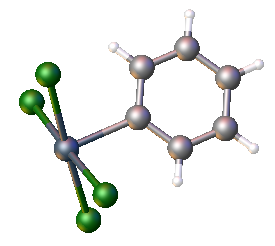
Structure of PhTeCl_{4}^{−}. Selected distances: Te-Cl = 250-253, Te-C = 213 pm.

One departure from sulfur and selenium chemistry is the availability of the tetrachloride, TeCl_{4}. It reacts with arenes to give aryltellurium trichlorides:

ArH + TeCl_{4} → ArTeCl_{3} + HCl

For electron-rich arenes, the disubstitution occurs

ArH + ArTeCl_{3} → Ar_{2}TeCl_{2} + HCl

Tellurium tetrachloride adds across alkenes and alkynes to the chloro tellurium trichlorides:

RCH=CH_{2} + TeCl_{4} → RCH(Cl)-CH_{2}TeCl_{3}

Organotellurium trichlorides adopt dimeric structures, reflecting the Lewis acidity of the Te(IV) center. The dimers are cleaved by halides and other Lewis bases:

RTeCl_{3} + Cl^{−} → RTeCl_{4}^{−}

The anions RTeCl_{4}^{−} (and the related adducts RTeCl_{3}L) adopt square pyramidal structures with the electronegative groups in the plane.

Organotellurium(IV) chlorides are susceptible to substitution reactions where by chloride is replaced by other halides and pseudohalides. The TeClx group can also be removed with Raney nickel.

Organotellurium(IV) compounds participate in Stille reactions:

=== Telluroxides ===
Telluroxides are generally related to sulfoxides and selenoxides in terms of their structures. Unlike their lighter analogues however, they polymerize (reversibly) when crystallized. Analogous to selenoxide oxidation, allylic telluroxides undergo [2,3]-sigmatropic rearrangements forming allylic alcohols after hydrolysis. Also analogous to the selenoxide elimination, certain telluroxides give alkenes upon heating.

=== Te(VI) ===
Hexamethylpertellurane was prepared by oxidation of tetramethyltellurium with xenon difluoride. The resulting TeF_{2}(CH_{3})_{4} is then treated with dimethylzinc:

Te(CH_{3})_{4} + XeF_{2} → Te(CH_{3})_{4}F_{2} + Xe
Te(CH_{3})_{4}F_{2} + Zn(CH_{3})_{2} → Te(CH_{3})_{6} + ZnF_{2}

The octahedral compounds TeAr_{6} have also been prepared.

== Applications ==
Dimethyl telluride is used to in metalorganic vapour phase epitaxy where it serves as a volatile source of Te. It is the only organotellurium compound that has been quantified in environmental samples.

Telluroethers undergo a variant of the selenoxide elimination.
