= Hydrogen ditelluride =

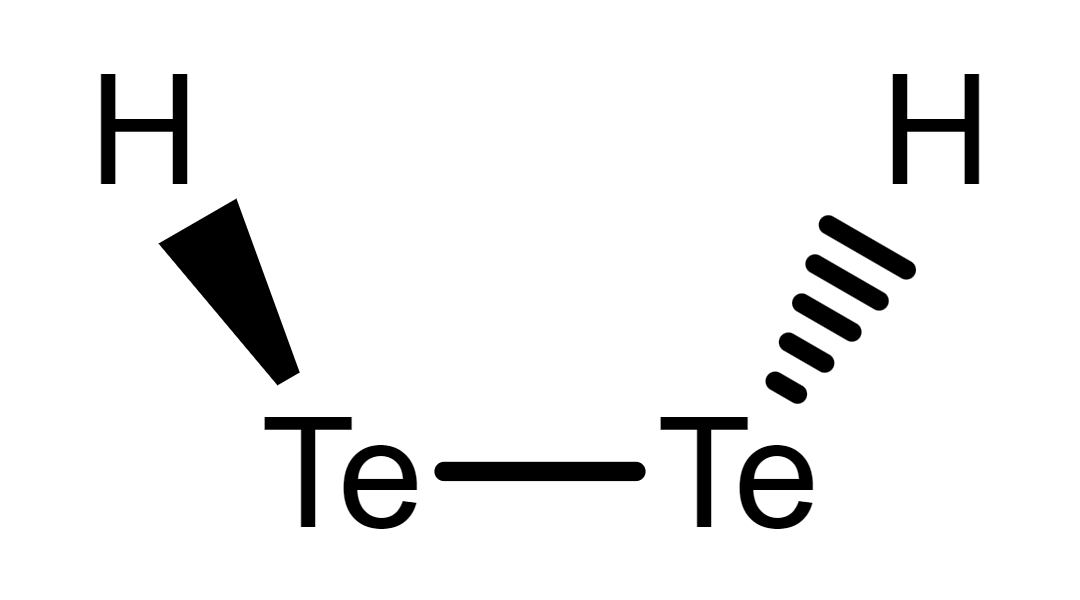

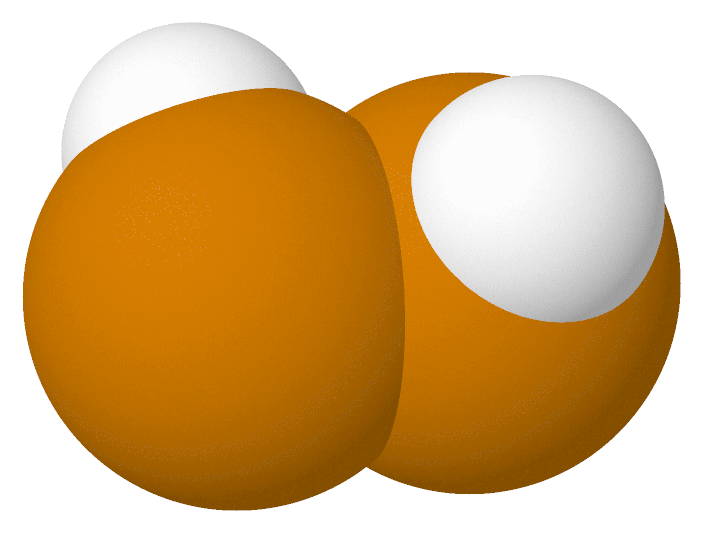
- Hydrogen ditelluride Tellurium, Te Hydrogen, H

Names
- IUPAC name Hydrogen ditelluride
- Systematic IUPAC name Ditellane
- Other names ditellane Dihydrogen ditellanide

Identifiers
CAS Number	55207-82-4
3D model (JSmol)	Interactive image
ChEBI	CHEBI:50478
ChemSpider	109898
Gmelin Reference	239518
PubChem CID	123292
CompTox Dashboard (EPA)	DTXSID001336331
- InChI: InChI=1S/H2Te2/c1-2/h1-2H Key: JVCDLODDVKFSTM-UHFFFAOYSA-N
- SMILES: [TeH][TeH]

Properties
Chemical formula	H_{2}Te_{2}
Molar mass	257.22 g·mol^{−1}
- Except where otherwise noted, data are given for materials in their standard state (at 25 °C [77 °F], 100 kPa). Infobox references

Hydrogen ditelluride or ditellane is an unstable hydrogen dichalcogenide containing two tellurium atoms per molecule, with structure H−Te−Te−H or (TeH)_{2}. Hydrogen ditelluride is interesting to theorists because its molecule is simple yet asymmetric (with no centre of symmetry) and is predicted to be one of the easiest to detect parity violation, in which the left handed molecule has differing properties to the right handed one due to the effects of the weak force.

== Production ==
Hydrogen ditelluride can possibly be formed at the tellurium cathode in electrolysis in acid. When electrolysed in alkaline solutions, a tellurium cathode produces ditelluride Te^{2−}_{2} ions, as well as Te^{2−} and a red polytelluride. The greatest amount of ditelluride is made when pH is over 12.

Apart from its speculative detection in electrolysis, ditellane has been detected in the gas phase produced from di-sec-butylditellane.

== Properties ==
Hydrogen ditelluride has been investigated theoretically, with various properties predicted. The molecule is twisted with a C_{2} symmetry. There are two enantiomers. Hydrogen ditelluride is one of the simplest possible unsymmetrical molecules; any simpler molecule will not have the required low symmetry. The equilibrium geometry (not counting zero point energy or vibrational energy) has bond lengths of 2.879 Å between the tellurium atoms and 1.678 Å between hydrogen and tellurium. The H−Te−Te angle is 94.93°. The angle of lowest energy between the two H−Te bonds (the dihedral angle between the H^{a}−Te−Te and Te−Te−H^{b} planes) is 89.32°. The trans configuration is higher in energy (3.71 kcal/mol), and the cis would be even higher (4.69 kcal/mol).

Being chiral, the molecule is predicted to show evidence of parity violation, though this may get interference from stereomutation tunneling, where the P enantiomer and M enantiomer spontaneously convert into each other by quantum tunneling. The parity violation effect on energy comes about from virtual Z boson exchanges between the nucleus and electrons. It is proportional to the cube of the atomic number, so is stronger in tellurium molecules than others higher up in the periodic table (O, S, Se). Because of parity violation, the energy of the two enantiomers differs, and is likely to be higher in this molecule than most molecules, so an effort is underway to observe this so-far undetected effect. The tunneling effect is reduced by higher masses, so that the deuterium form, D_{2}Te_{2} will show less tunneling. In a torsional vibrational mode, the molecule can twist back and forward storing energy. Seven different quantum vibration levels are predicted below the energy to jump to the other enantiomer. The levels are numbered v_{t} = 0 up to 6. The sixth level is predicted to be split into two energy levels because of quantum tunneling. The parity violation energy is calculated as 3×10^{−9} cm^{−1} or 90 Hz.

The different vibrational modes for H_{2}Te are symmetrical stretch of H−Te, symmetrical bend of H−Te−Te, torsion, stretch Te−Te, asymmetrical stretch H−Te, asymmetrical bend of H−Te−Te. The time to tunnel between enantiomers is only 0.6 ms for ^{1}H_{2}Te_{2}, but is 66000 seconds (18 h 20 min) for the tritium isotopomer T_{2}Te_{2}.

== Related ==
There are organic derivatives, in which the hydrogen is replaced by organic groups. One example is bis(2,4,6-tributylphenyl)ditellane. Others are diphenyl ditelluride and 1,2-bis(cyclohexylmethyl)ditellane. A ligand -TeTeH is known in some transition metal complexes. IUPAC nomenclature calls this "ditellanido".
