= Selenocyanate =

Class of chemical compounds

Identifiers
CAS Number	5749-48-4
3D model (JSmol)	Interactive image
Beilstein Reference	1848016
ChEBI	CHEBI:29445
ChEMBL	ChEMBL448089
ChemSpider	69410
Gmelin Reference	81789
PubChem CID	76961
CompTox Dashboard (EPA)	DTXSID90973017
- InChI: InChI=1S/CHNSe/c2-1-3/h3H/p-1 Key: CRDYSYOERSZTHZ-UHFFFAOYSA-M
- SMILES: C(#N)[Se-]

Properties
Chemical formula	CNSe^{−}
Molar mass	104.990 g·mol^{−1}

Related compounds
Related compounds	thiocyanate; cyanate
- Except where otherwise noted, data are given for materials in their standard state (at 25 °C [77 °F], 100 kPa). Infobox references

A selenocyanate is an ion or chemical compound that contains the -SeCN group, which could be in the form of an anion, SeCN^{−}. Organic selenocyanates also exist.

Some complex ions with transition metals such as silver and mercury (mercuriselenocyanates) are known. Mercuriselenocyanate salts also include K, Fe, Co, Ni, Cu, Zn, and Cd. Complex ions include Fe(NCSe)_{6}^{3−}, Fe(NCSe)_{6}^{4−}, Fe(NCSe)_{4}^{2−}, Co(NCSe)_{6}^{4−}, Co(NCSe)_{4}^{2−}, Ni(NCSe)_{6}^{4−}, Zn(NCSe)_{6}^{4−}, Rh(NCSe)_{6}^{4−}, Pd(NCSe)_{4}^{2−}, Ag(SeCN)_{2}^{−}, Cd(NCSe)_{4}^{2−}, Cd(NCSe)_{6}^{4−}, Dy(NCSe)_{6}^{3−}, Ho(NCSe)_{6}^{3−}, Er(NCSe)_{6}^{3−}, Pt(NCSe)_{6}^{2−}, Au(NCSe)_{4}^{−}, and Hg(NCSe)_{4}^{2−}.

For hard metals, the negative charge is on the nitrogen atom which coordinates with the metal atom. Examples include Ti(NCSe)_{6}^{2−}, V(NCSe)_{6}^{3−}, VO(NCSe)_{4}^{2−}, Cr(NCSe)_{6}^{3−}, Mn(NCSe)_{4}^{2−}, Mn(NCSe)_{4}^{2−}, Y(NCSe)_{6}^{3−}, Zr(NCSe)_{6}^{2−}, Mo(NCSe)_{6}^{3−}, Pr(NCSe)_{6}^{3−}, Nd(NCSe)_{6}^{3−}, Sm(NCSe)_{6}^{3−}, Hf(NCSe)_{6}^{2−}, Re_{2}(NCSe)_{8}^{2−}, Pa(NCSe)_{8}^{4−} and U(NCSe)_{8}^{4−}.

== Production ==
Selenocyanate can be produced in the reaction of selenium, selenide, selenite or selenate with cyanide ions.

Se^{2−} + CN^{−} + 0.5 O_{2} + H_{2}O → SeCN^{−} + 2OH^{−}
SeO_{3}^{2−} + 3CN^{−} + H_{2}O → 2OCN^{−} + SeCN^{−} + 2OH^{−}
SeO_{4}^{2−} + 4CN^{−} + H_{2}O → 3OCN^{−} + SeCN^{−} + 2OH^{−}

== Reactions ==
Selenocyanate is oxidised to selenium and cyanate by bis (trifluoroacetoxy) iodobenzene. Conversely, triphenylphosphine reduces it to cyanide.

Organic selenocyanates (RSeCN) tend, in nucleophilic substitutions, to react as sources of RSe^{+} and CN^{−}. They are in a reversible equilibrium with isoselenocyanates (RN=C=Se).

== Application ==
Selenocyanate is component of pollution from oil refineries and mine drainage water. Remediation methods have been investigated to extract selenocyanate from water. Methods considered include precipitation by metal salts, or extraction by plants. Indian mustard converts some selenocyanate to selenocystine and selenomethionine, and volatiles dimethylselenide and methylselenocyanate.

== List ==
formula	crystal form	space group	Å	volume	density	comment	reference
[NH_{4}][SeCN]	monoclinic	P2_{1}/c	a=4.3443 b=7.3615 c=12.9858 β=99.152° Z=4	416.99		pink due to contamination from red selenium	
KSeCN	monoclinic	P2_{1}/c	a=4.59 b=7.64 c=11.89 β=101.13°				
Ag[SeCN]	monoclinic	C2/c	a=8.8300 b=8.2471 c=8.4303 β=93.027° Z=8	613.05		solubility at 18°: 2.0×10^{−8} Mol/litre	
[NH_{4}][Ag(SeCN)_{2}]	orthorhombic	Pbca	a=7.15549 b=20.0671 c=10.4776 Z=8	1504.49			
[NH_{4}]_{3}[Ag(SeCN)_{4}]	tetragonal	I4_{1}/acd	a=14.0013 c=31.4678 Z=16	6168.8			
[NH_{4}]_{0.7}K_{0.3}[SeCN]							
K_{2}Hg(CNSe)_{4}							
[Cu(IPr)(NCSe)]2 IPr = 1,3- bis(2,6-diisopropylphenyl)imidazol-2-ylidene	triclinic	P1̅	a=9.389 b=10.9745 c=14.0542 101.181 90.311 105.620 Z=1	1365.7		@100K	
ZnHg(CNSe)_{4}							
CdHg(CNSe)_{4}							
