= Hydrogen diselenide =

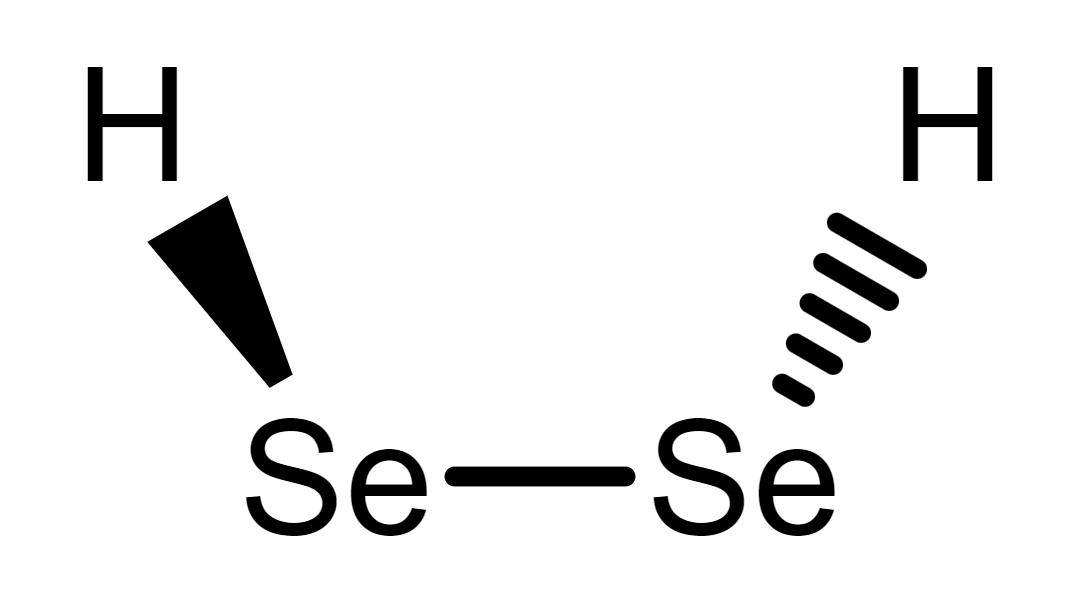

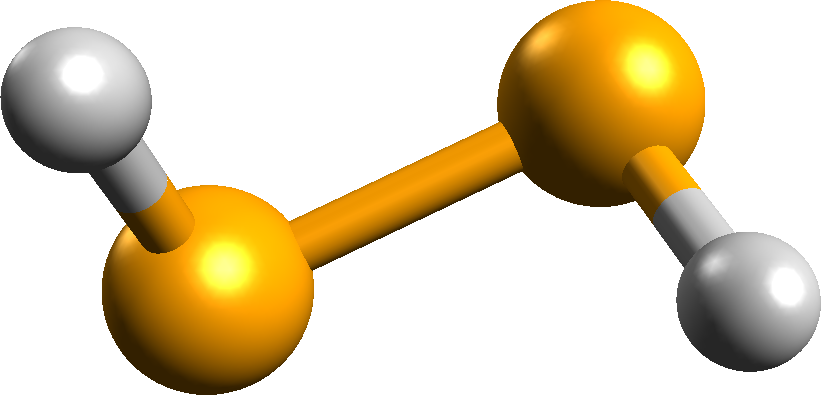
Hydrogen diselenide’s ball and stick model
Selenium, Se
Hydrogen, H
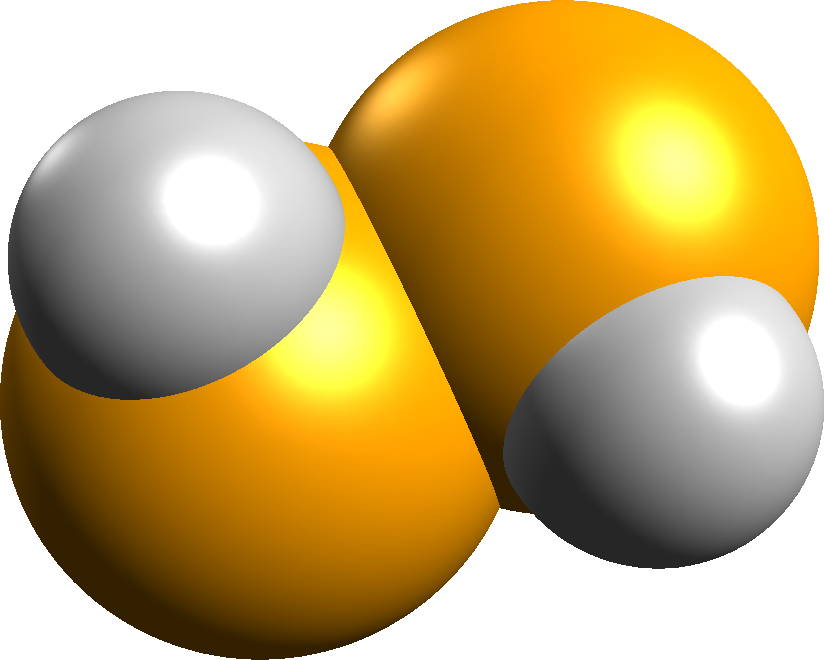
Hydrogen diselenide’s space filling model

Names
- IUPAC name Dihydrogen diselenide
- Other names Diselane

Identifiers
CAS Number	7783-07-5
3D model (JSmol)	Interactive image
ChEBI	CHEBI:50476
ChemSpider	4416259
Gmelin Reference	558110
PubChem CID	5248613
UNII	V91P54KPAM
CompTox Dashboard (EPA)	DTXSID101337225
- InChI: InChI=1S/H2S2/c1-2/h1-2H Key: BWGNESOTFCXPMA-UHFFFAOYSA-N; InChI=1S/H2Se2/c1-2/h1-2H Key: AVJWYAUVPWRPJX-UHFFFAOYSA-N
- SMILES: [SeH][SeH]

Properties
Chemical formula	H_{2}Se_{2}
Molar mass	159.958 g·mol^{−1}
Appearance	oily liquid
Odor	Highly offensive, rotten eggs

Hazards
Flash point	Flammable

Related compounds
Related compounds	Hydrogen peroxide; Hydrogen selenide; Hydrogen disulfide
- Except where otherwise noted, data are given for materials in their standard state (at 25 °C [77 °F], 100 kPa). verify (what is ?) Infobox references

Hydrogen diselenide is an inorganic selenium compound with a chemical formula H_{2}Se_{2} or (SeH)_{2}. At room temperature, hydrogen diselenide dissociates easily to hydrogen selenide (H_{2}Se) and elemental selenium, and is therefore not stable. When an aluminum-reduced hydrochloric acid solution of selenium dioxide is reacted with lead acetate, the resulting black precipitate contains lead diselenide (PbSe_{2})，this proves that hydrogen diselenide exists in the gas mixture.However, hydrogen diselenide can be stable in some solutions.
