= Trioxidane =

Chemical compound

- Structural formula of trioxidane

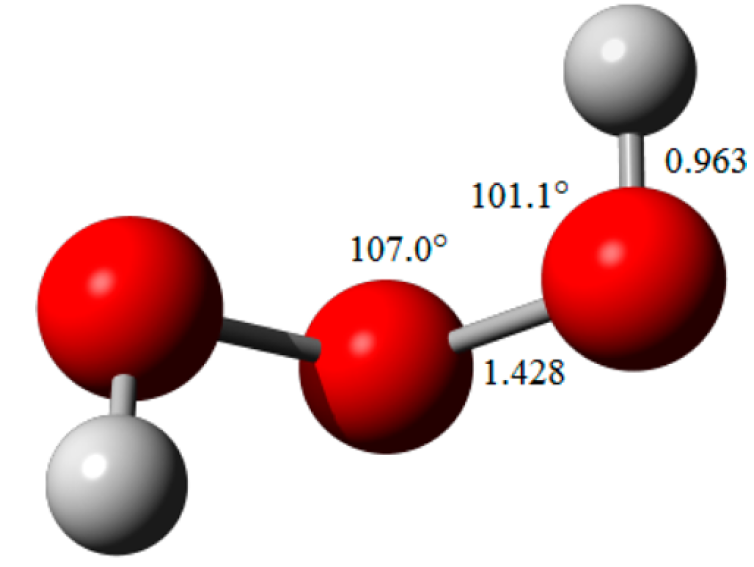

Names
- Preferred IUPAC name Trioxidane (only preselected name)
- Systematic IUPAC name Dihydrogen trioxide
- Other names Hydrogen trioxide

Identifiers
CAS Number	14699-99-1
3D model (JSmol)	Interactive image
ChEBI	CHEBI:46736
ChemSpider	145859
Gmelin Reference	200290
PubChem CID	166717
CompTox Dashboard (EPA)	DTXSID60932994
- InChI: InChI=1S/H2O3/c1-3-2/h1-2H Key: JSPLKZUTYZBBKA-UHFFFAOYSA-N; InChI=1/H2O3/c1-3-2/h1-2H Key: JSPLKZUTYZBBKA-UHFFFAOYAV
- SMILES: OOO

Properties
Chemical formula	H_{2}O_{3}
Molar mass	50.013 g·mol^{−1}
Acidity (pK_{a})	9.5 ± 0.2

Related compounds
Related isoelectronic	Trisulfane; Sulfoxylic acid
Related compounds	Water; Hydrogen peroxide; Tetraoxidane; Pentaoxidane; Hydrogen ozonide; Hydroperoxyl; Triazane
- Except where otherwise noted, data are given for materials in their standard state (at 25 °C [77 °F], 100 kPa). verify (what is ?) Infobox references

Trioxidane (systematically named dihydrogen trioxide,), also called hydrogen trioxide is an inorganic compound with the chemical formula H_{2}O_{3} or O(OH)_{2} (can be also written as H[O]_{3}H or [H(μ-O_{3})H]). It is one of the unstable hydrogen polyoxides. In aqueous solutions, trioxidane decomposes to form water and singlet oxygen:

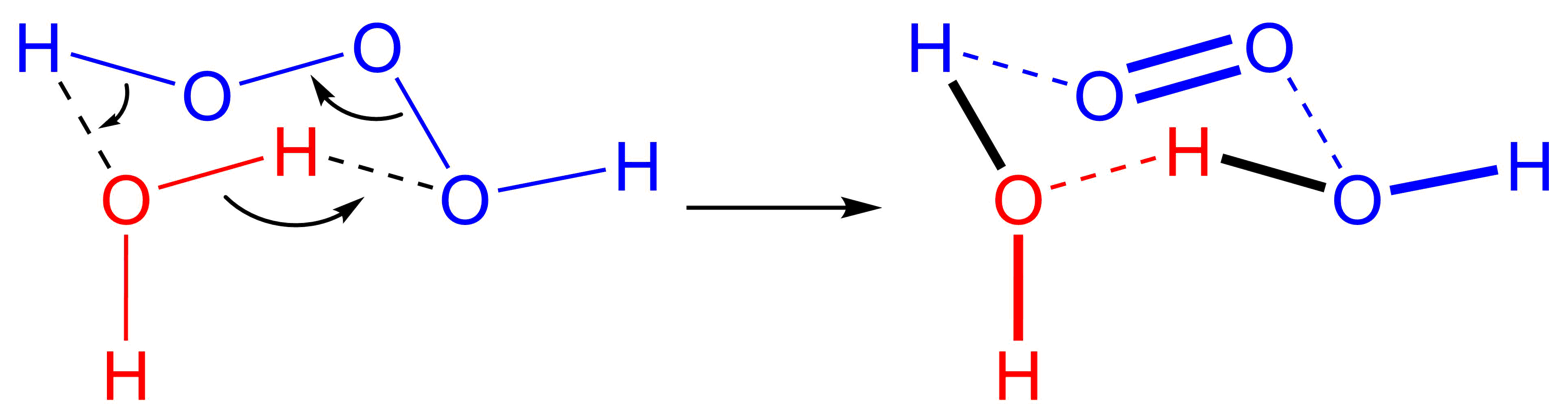
Reaction of trioxidane (blue) with water (red) results in decomposition to oxygen and an additional water molecule.

The reverse reaction, the addition of singlet oxygen to water, typically does not occur in part due to the scarcity of singlet oxygen. In biological systems, however, ozone is known to be generated from singlet oxygen, and the presumed mechanism is an antibody-catalyzed production of trioxidane from singlet oxygen.

== Preparation ==
Trioxidane can be obtained in small, but detectable amounts in reactions of ozone and hydrogen peroxide; or by the electrolysis of water. Larger quantities have been prepared by the reaction of ozone with organic reducing agents at low temperatures in a variety of organic solvents, such as the anthraquinone process. It is also formed during the decomposition of organic hydrotrioxides (ROOOH). Alternatively, trioxidane can be prepared by reduction of ozone with 1,2-diphenylhydrazine at low temperature. Using a resin-bound version of the latter, relatively pure trioxidane can be isolated as a solution in organic solvent. Preparation of high purity solutions is possible using the methyltrioxorhenium(VII) catalyst. In acetone-d_{6} at −20 °C, the characteristic ^{1}H NMR signal of trioxidane could be observed at a chemical shift of 13.1 ppm. Solutions of hydrogen trioxide in diethyl ether can be safely stored at –20 °C for as long as a week.

The reaction of ozone with hydrogen peroxide is known as the "peroxone process". This mixture has been used for some time for treating groundwater contaminated with organic compounds. The reaction produces H_{2}O_{3} and H_{2}O_{5}.

== Structure ==
In 1970–75, Giguère et al. observed infrared and Raman spectra of dilute aqueous solutions of trioxidane. In 2005, trioxidane was observed experimentally by microwave spectroscopy in a supersonic jet. The molecule exists in a skewed structure, with an oxygen–oxygen–oxygen–hydrogen dihedral angle of 81.8°. The oxygen–oxygen bond lengths of 142.8 picometer are slightly shorter than the 146.4 pm oxygen–oxygen bonds in hydrogen peroxide. Various dimeric and trimeric forms also seem to exist.

There is a trend of increasing gas-phase acidity and corresponding pK_{a} as the number of oxygen atoms in the chain increases in HO_{n}H structures (n=1,2,3).

== Reactions ==
Trioxidane readily decomposes into water and singlet oxygen, with a half-life of about 16 minutes in organic solvents at room temperature, but only milliseconds in water. It reacts with organic sulfides to form sulfoxides, but little else is known of its reactivity.

Recent research found that trioxidane is the active ingredient responsible for the antimicrobial properties of the well known ozone/hydrogen peroxide mix. Because these two compounds are present in biological systems as well it is argued that an antibody in the human body can generate trioxidane as a powerful oxidant against invading bacteria. The source of the compound in biological systems is the reaction between singlet oxygen and water (which proceeds in either direction, of course, according to concentrations), with the singlet oxygen being produced by immune cells.

Computational chemistry predicts that more oxygen chain molecules or hydrogen polyoxides exist and that even indefinitely long oxygen chains can exist in a low-temperature gas. With this spectroscopic evidence a search for these types of molecules can start in interstellar space. A 2022 publication suggested the possibility of the presence of detectable concentrations of polyoxides in the atmosphere.

== See also ==
- 1,2,3-Trioxolanes
