= Hydrogen selenide =

- Structural diagram of the hydrogen selenide molecule

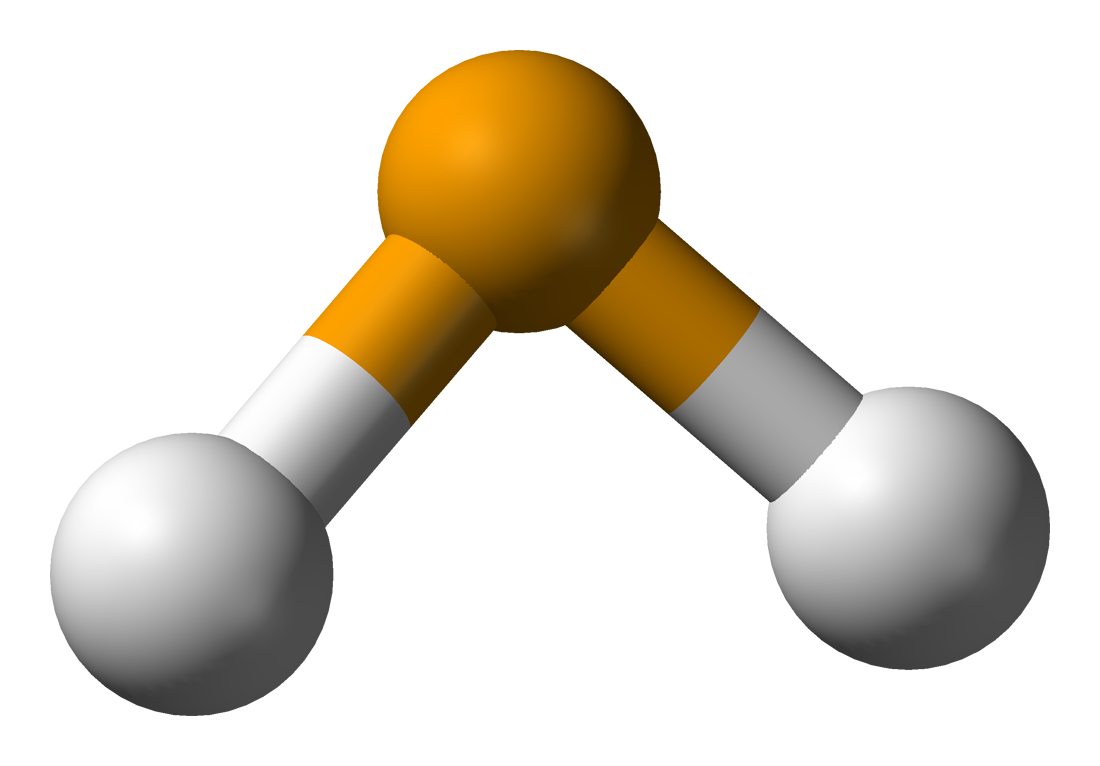
Ball-and-stick model of hydrogen selenide molecule
Space-filling model of the hydrogen selenide molecule
Selenium, Se
Hydrogen, H

Names
- IUPAC name Hydrogen selenide
- Other names Hydroselenic acid selane selenium hydride

Identifiers
CAS Number	7783-07-5
3D model (JSmol)	Interactive image
ChEBI	CHEBI:16503
ChemSpider	518
ECHA InfoCard	100.029.071
EC Number	231-978-9
KEGG	C01528
PubChem CID	533
RTECS number	X1050000
UNII	V91P54KPAM
UN number	2202
CompTox Dashboard (EPA)	DTXSID20872822
- InChI: InChI=1S/H2Se/h1H2 Key: SPVXKVOXSXTJOY-UHFFFAOYSA-N; InChI=1/H2Se/h1H2 Key: SPVXKVOXSXTJOY-UHFFFAOYAF
- SMILES: [SeH2]

Properties
Chemical formula	H_{2}Se
Molar mass	159.958 g·mol^{−1}
Appearance	Colorless gas
Odor	decayed horseradish
Density	3.553 g/dm^{3}
Melting point	−65.73 °C (−86.31 °F; 207.42 K)
Boiling point	−41.25 °C (−42.25 °F; 231.90 K)
Solubility in water	0.70 g/100 mL
Solubility	soluble in CS_{2}, phosgene
Vapor pressure	9.5 atm (21°C)
Acidity (pK_{a})	3.89
Conjugate acid	Selenonium
Conjugate base	Selenide

Structure
Molecular shape	Bent

Hazards
- Occupational safety and health (OHS/OSH)
Main hazards	Extremely toxic and flammable
- GHS labelling
Pictograms	(GHS02: Flammable) (GHS06: Toxic) (GHS09: Environmental hazard)
Signal word	Danger
Hazard statements	H220, H330, H410
Precautionary statements	P210, P260, P271, P273, P284, P304+P340, P310, P320, P377, P381, P391, P403, P403+P233, P405, P410+P403, P501
NFPA 704 (fire diamond)	4 4 0
Flash point	flammable gas
- Lethal dose or concentration (LD, LC)
LC_{Lo} (lowest published)	0.3 ppm (guinea pig, 8 hr); 5.9 ppm (rat, 1 hr)
- NIOSH (US health exposure limits)
PEL (Permissible)	TWA 0.05 ppm (0.2 mg/m^{3})
REL (Recommended)	TWA 0.05 ppm (0.2 mg/m^{3})
IDLH (Immediate danger)	1 ppm
Safety data sheet (SDS)	ICSC 0284

Related compounds
Other anions	H_{2}O; H_{2}S; H_{2}Te; H_{2}Po
Other cations	Na_{2}Se; Ag_{2}Se
Related compounds	Arsine
- Except where otherwise noted, data are given for materials in their standard state (at 25 °C [77 °F], 100 kPa). verify (what is ?) Infobox references

Hydrogen selenide is an inorganic compound with the formula H_{2}Se. This hydrogen chalcogenide is the simplest and most commonly encountered hydride of selenium. H_{2}Se is a colorless, flammable gas under standard conditions. It is the most toxic selenium compound with an exposure limit of 0.05 ppm over an 8-hour period. Even at extremely low concentrations, this compound has a very irritating smell resembling that of decayed horseradish or "leaking gas" and rotting garlic at the odor threshold at still lower concentration. At high concentrations the compound smells of rotten eggs.

== Structure and properties ==
H_{2}Se adopts a bent structure with a H−Se−H bond angle of 91°. Consistent with this structure, three IR-active vibrational bands are observed: 2358, 2345, and 1034 cm^{−1}.

The properties of H_{2}S and H_{2}Se are similar, although the selenide is more acidic with pK_{a} = 3.89 and the second pK_{a} = 11, or 15.05 ± 0.02 at 25 °C.

== Preparation ==
Industrially, it is produced by treating elemental selenium at T > 300 °C with hydrogen gas. A number of routes to H_{2}Se have been reported, which are suitable for both large and small scale preparations. In the laboratory, H_{2}Se is usually prepared by the action of water on Al_{2}Se_{3}, concomitant with formation of hydrated alumina. A related reaction involves the acid hydrolysis of FeSe.

Al_{2}Se_{3} + 6 H_{2}O ⇌ 2 Al(OH)_{3} + 3 H_{2}Se

H_{2}Se can also be prepared by means of different methods based on the in situ generation in aqueous solution using boron hydride, Marsh test and Devarda's alloy. According to the Sonoda method, H_{2}Se is generated from the reaction of H_{2}O and CO on Se in the presence of Et_{3}N. H_{2}Se can be purchased in cylinders.

== Reactions ==
Elemental selenium can be recovered from H_{2}Se through a reaction with aqueous sulfur dioxide (SO_{2}).

2 H_{2}Se + SO_{2} ⇌ 2 H_{2}O + 2 Se + S

Its decomposition is used to prepare the highly pure element.

== Applications ==
H_{2}Se is commonly used in the synthesis of Se-containing compounds. It adds across alkenes. Illustrative is the synthesis of selenoureas from cyanamides:

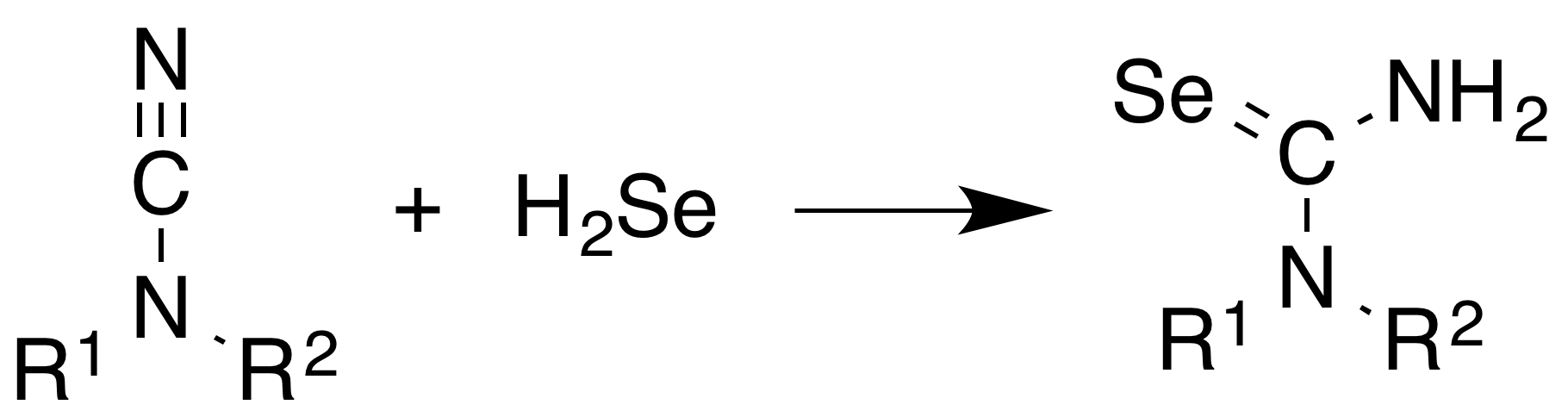

H_{2}Se gas is used to dope semiconductors with selenium.

== Safety ==
Hydrogen selenide is hazardous, being the most toxic selenium compound and far more toxic than its congener hydrogen sulfide. The threshold limit value is 0.05 ppm. The gas acts as an irritant at concentrations higher than 0.3 ppm, which is the main warning sign of exposure; below 1 ppm, this is "insufficient to prevent exposure", while at 1.5 ppm the irritation is "intolerable". Exposure at high concentrations, even for less than a minute, causes the gas to attack the eyes and mucous membranes; this causes cold-like symptoms for at least a few days afterwards. In Germany, the limit in drinking water is 0.008 mg/L, and the US EPA recommends a maximum contamination of 0.01 mg/L.

Despite being extremely toxic, no human fatalities have yet been reported. It is suspected that this is due to the gas' tendency to oxidise to form red selenium in mucous membranes; elemental selenium is less toxic than selenides are.

== See also ==
- Hydrogen diselenide
