= Oxyacid =

Acid that contains oxygen

An oxyacid, oxoacid, or ternary acid is an acid that contains oxygen. Specifically, it is a compound that contains hydrogen, oxygen, and at least one other element, with at least one hydrogen atom bonded to oxygen that can dissociate to produce the H^{+} cation and the anion of the acid.

== Description ==
Under Lavoisier's original theory, all acids contained oxygen, which was named from Ancient Greek: ὀξύς + -γενής, romanized: oxys + -genes, lit. 'acid, sharp + creator'. It was later discovered that some acids, notably hydrochloric acid, did not contain oxygen and so acids were divided into oxo-acids and these new hydroacids.

All oxyacids have the acidic hydrogen bound to an oxygen atom, so bond strength (length) is not a factor, as it is with binary nonmetal hydrides. Rather, the electronegativity of the central atom and the number of oxygen atoms determine oxyacid acidity. For oxyacids with the same central atom, acid strength increases with the number of oxygen atoms attached to it. With the same number of oxygen atoms attached to it, acid strength increases with increasing electronegativity of the central atom.

Compared to the salts of their deprotonated forms (a class of compounds known as the oxyanions), oxyacids are generally less stable, and many of them only exist formally as hypothetical species, or only exist in solution and cannot be isolated in pure form. There are several general reasons for this: (1) they may condense to form oligomers (e.g., H_{2}CrO_{4} to H_{2}Cr_{2}O_{7}), or dehydrate all the way to form the anhydride (e.g., H_{2}CO_{3} to CO_{2}), (2) they may disproportionate to one compound of higher and another of lower oxidation state (e.g., HClO_{2} to HClO and HClO_{3}), or (3) they might exist almost entirely as another, more stable tautomeric form (e.g., phosphorous acid P(OH)_{3} exists almost entirely as phosphonic acid HP(=O)(OH)_{2}). Nevertheless, perchloric acid (HClO_{4}), sulfuric acid (H_{2}SO_{4}), and nitric acid (HNO_{3}) are a few common oxyacids that are relatively easily prepared as pure substances.

Imidic acids are created by replacing =O with =NR in an oxyacid.

== Properties ==
An oxyacid molecule contains the structure X−O−H, where other atoms or atom groups can be connected to the central atom X. In a solution, such a molecule can be dissociated into ions in two distinct ways:

- X−O−H ⇌ (X−O)^{−} + H^{+}
- X−O−H ⇌ X^{+} + OH^{−}

If the central atom X is strongly electronegative, then it strongly attracts the electrons of the oxygen atom. In that case, the bond between the oxygen and hydrogen atom is weak, and the compound ionizes easily in the way of the former of the two chemical equations above. In this case, the compound XOH is an acid, because it releases a proton, that is, a hydrogen ion. For example, nitrogen, sulfur and chlorine are strongly electronegative elements, and therefore nitric acid, sulfuric acid, and perchloric acid, are strong acids. The acidity of oxyacids is also affected by the resonance stabilization of their conjugate bases. Double-bonded oxygen is electron withdrawing by resonance, so the negative charge of a deprotonated hydroxyl group can be distributed to other oxygen atoms. Both acetic acid and methanol contain C-O-H groups that can act as acids, but acetic acid is a far stronger acid because its conjugate base, acetate, can distribute its negative charge over two oxygen atoms. In contrast, the conjugate acid of methanol has the negative charge localized on oxygen, so it is a far stronger base than acetate, making acetic acid the stronger acid.

If, however, the electronegativity of X is low, then the compound is dissociated to ions according to the latter chemical equation, and XOH is an alkaline hydroxide. Examples of such compounds are sodium hydroxide NaOH and calcium hydroxide Ca(OH)_{2}. Owing to the high electronegativity of oxygen, however, most of the common oxobases, such as sodium hydroxide, while strongly basic in water, are only moderately basic in comparison to other bases. For example, the pKa of the conjugate acid of sodium hydroxide, water, is 14.0, while that of sodium amide, ammonia, is closer to 40, making sodium hydroxide a much weaker base than sodium amide.

If the electronegativity of X is somewhere in between, the compound can be amphoteric, and in that case it can dissociate to ions in both ways, in the former case when reacting with bases, and in the latter case when reacting with acids. Examples of this include water, aliphatic alcohols, such as ethanol, and aluminum hydroxide.

Inorganic oxyacids typically have a chemical formula of type H_{m}XO_{n}, where X is an atom functioning as a central atom, whereas parameters m and n depend on the oxidation state of the element X. In most cases, the element X is a nonmetal, but some metals, for example chromium and manganese, can form oxyacids when occurring at their highest oxidation states.

When oxyacids are heated, many of them dissociate to water and the anhydride of the acid. In most cases, such anhydrides are oxides of nonmetals. For example, carbon dioxide, CO_{2}, is the anhydride of carbonic acid, H_{2}CO_{3}, and sulfur trioxide, SO_{3}, is the anhydride of sulfuric acid, H_{2}SO_{4}. These anhydrides react quickly with water and form those oxyacids again.

Many organic acids, like carboxylic acids and phenols, are oxyacids. Their molecular structure, however, is much more complicated than that of inorganic oxyacids.

Most of the commonly encountered acids are oxyacids. Indeed, in the 18th century, Lavoisier assumed that all acids contain oxygen and that oxygen causes their acidity. Because of this, he gave to this element its name, oxygenium, derived from Greek and meaning acid-maker, which is still, in a more or less modified form, used in most languages. Later, however, Humphry Davy showed that the so-called muriatic acid did not contain oxygen, despite its being a strong acid; instead, it is a solution of hydrogen chloride, HCl. Such acids which do not contain oxygen are nowadays known as hydroacids.

== Names of inorganic oxyacids ==
Many inorganic oxyacids are traditionally called with names ending with the word acid and which also contain, in a somewhat modified form, the name of the element they contain in addition to hydrogen and oxygen. Well-known examples of such acids are sulfuric acid, nitric acid and phosphoric acid.

This practice is fully well-established, and IUPAC has accepted such names. In light of the current chemical nomenclature, this practice is an exception, because systematic names of compounds are formed according to the elements they contain and their molecular structure, not according to other properties (for example, acidity) they have.

IUPAC, however, recommends against calling future compounds not yet discovered with a name ending with the word acid. Indeed, acids can be called with names formed by adding the word hydrogen in front of the corresponding anion; for example, sulfuric acid could just as well be called hydrogen sulfate (or dihydrogen sulfate). In fact, the fully systematic name of sulfuric acid, according to IUPAC's rules, would be dihydroxidodioxidosulfur and that of the sulfate ion, tetraoxidosulfate(2−), Such names, however, are almost never used.

However, the same element can form more than one acid when compounded with hydrogen and oxygen. In such cases, the English practice to distinguish such acids is to use the suffix -ic in the name of the element in the name of the acid containing more oxygen atoms, and the suffix -ous in the name of the element in the name of the acid containing fewer oxygen atoms. Thus, for example, sulfuric acid is H_{2}SO_{4}, and sulfurous acid, H_{2}SO_{3}. Analogously, nitric acid is HNO_{3}, and nitrous acid, HNO_{2}. If there are more than two oxyacids having the same element as the central atom, then, in some cases, acids are distinguished by adding the prefix per- or hypo- to their names. The prefix per-, however, is used only when the central atom is a halogen, a group 7 element, a group 8 element or xenon. For example, chlorine has the four following oxyacids:

- hypochlorous acid HClO
- chlorous acid HClO_{2}
- chloric acid HClO_{3}
- perchloric acid HClO_{4}

Note that peroxo- acids should not be confused with per- acids: a peroxo acid has an -OOH moiety instead of a -OH moiety.

Some elemental atoms can exist in a high enough oxidation state that they can hold one more double-bonded oxygen atom than the perhalic acids do. In that case, any acids regarding such element are given the prefix hyper-. Currently, the only known acid with this prefix is hyperruthenic acid, H_{2}RuO_{5}.

The suffix -ite occurs in names of anions and salts derived from acids whose names end to the suffix -ous. On the other hand, the suffix -ate occurs in names of anions and salts derived from acids whose names end to the suffix -ic. Prefixes hypo- and per- occur in the name of anions and salts; for example the ion ClO^{−}_{4} is called perchlorate.

In a few cases, the prefixes ortho- and para- occur in names of some oxyacids and their derivative anions. In such cases, the para- acid is what can be thought as remaining of the ortho- acid if a water molecule is separated from the ortho- acid molecule. For example, phosphoric acid, H_{3}PO_{4}, has sometimes been called orthophosphoric acid, in order to distinguish it from metaphosphoric acid, HPO_{3}. However, according to IUPAC's current rules, the prefix ortho- should only be used in names of orthotelluric acid and orthoperiodic acid, and their corresponding anions and salts.

=== Examples ===
In the following table, the formula and the name of the anion refer to what remains of the acid when it loses all its hydrogen atoms as protons. Many of these acids, however, are polyprotic, and in such cases, there also exists one or more intermediate anions. In name of such anions, the prefix hydrogen- (in older nomenclature bi-) is added, with numeral prefixes if needed. For example, SO^{2−}_{4} is the sulfate anion, and HSO^{−}_{4}, the hydrogensulfate (or bisulfate) anion. Similarly, PO^{3−}_{4} is phosphate, HPO^{2−}_{4} is hydrogenphosphate, and H_{2}PO^{−}_{4} is dihydrogenphosphate.

Oxyacids and their corresponding anions
Element group	Element (central atom)	Oxidation state	Acid formula	Acid name	Anion formula	Anion name
6	Chromium	+6	H_{2}CrO_{4}	Chromic acid	CrO^{2−}_{4}	Chromate
6	Chromium	+6	H_{2}Cr_{2}O_{7}	Dichromic acid	Cr_{2}O^{2−}_{7}	Dichromate
7	Manganese	+7	HMnO_{4}	Permanganic acid	MnO^{−}_{4}	Permanganate
7	Manganese	+6	H_{2}MnO_{4}	Manganic acid	MnO^{2−}_{4}	Manganate
7	Technetium	+7	HTcO_{4}	Pertechnetic acid	TcO^{−}_{4}	Pertechnetate
7	Technetium	+6	H_{2}TcO_{4}	Technetic acid	TcO^{2−}_{4}	Technetate
7	Rhenium	+7	HReO_{4}	Perrhenic acid	ReO^{−}_{4}	Perrhenate
7	Rhenium	+6	H_{2}ReO_{4}	Tetraoxorhenic(VI) acid	ReO^{2−}_{4}	Rhenate(VI)
7	Rhenium	+5	HReO_{3}	Trioxorhenic(V) acid	ReO^{−}_{3}	Trioxorhenate(V)
7	Rhenium	+5	H_{3}ReO_{4}	Tetraoxorhenic(V) acid	ReO^{3−}_{4}	Tetraoxorhenate(V)
7	Rhenium	+5	H_{4}Re_{2}O_{7}	Heptaoxodirhenic(V) acid	Re_{2}O^{4−}_{7}	Dirhenate(V)
8	Iron	+6	H_{2}FeO_{4}	Ferric acid	FeO_{4}^{2–}	Ferrate
8	Ruthenium	+6	H_{2}RuO_{4}	Ruthenic acid	RuO_{4}^{2–}	Ruthenate
8	Ruthenium	+7	HRuO_{4}	Perruthenic acid	RuO_{4}^{–}	Perruthenate (note difference in usage compared to osmium)
8	Ruthenium	+8	H_{2}RuO_{5}	Hyperruthenic acid	HRuO_{5}^{–}	Hyperruthenate
8	Osmium	+6	H_{6}OsO_{6}	Osmic acid	H_{4}OsO_{6}^{2–}	Osmate
8	Osmium	+8	H_{4}OsO_{6}	Perosmic acid	H_{2}OsO_{6}^{2–}	Perosmate (note difference in usage compared to ruthenium)
13	Boron	+3	H_{3}BO_{3}	Boric acid (formerly orthoboric acid)	BO^{3−}_{3}	Borate (formerly orthoborate)
13	Boron	+3	(HBO_{2})_{n}	Metaboric acid	BO^{−}_{2}	Metaborate
14	Carbon	+4	H_{2}CO_{3}	Carbonic acid	CO^{2−}_{3}	Carbonate
14	Silicon	+4	H_{4}SiO_{4}	Silicic acid (formerly orthosilicic acid)	SiO^{4−}_{4}	Silicate (formerly orthosilicate)
14	Silicon	+4	H_{2}SiO_{3}	Metasilicic acid	SiO^{2−}_{3}	Metasilicate
14, 15	Carbon, nitrogen	+4, −3	HOCN	Cyanic acid	OCN^{−}	Cyanate
15	Nitrogen	+5	HNO_{3}	Nitric acid	NO^{−}_{3}	Nitrate
15	Nitrogen	+5	HNO_{4}	Peroxynitric acid	NO^{−}_{4}	Peroxynitrate
15	Nitrogen	+5	H_{3}NO_{4}	Orthonitric acid	NO^{3−}_{4}	Orthonitrate
15	Nitrogen	+3	HNO_{2}	Nitrous acid	NO^{−}_{2}	Nitrite
15	Nitrogen	+3	HOONO	Peroxynitrous acid	OONO^{−}	Peroxynitrite
15	Nitrogen	+2	H_{2}NO_{2}	Nitroxylic acid	NO^{2−}_{2}	Nitroxylate
15	Nitrogen	+1	H_{2}N_{2}O_{2}	Hyponitrous acid	N_{2}O^{2−}_{2}	Hyponitrite
15	Phosphorus	+5	H_{3}PO_{4}	Phosphoric acid (formerly orthophosphoric acid)	PO^{3−}_{4}	Phosphate (orthophosphate)
15	Phosphorus	+5	HPO_{3}	Metaphosphoric acid	PO^{−}_{3}	Metaphosphate
15	Phosphorus	+5	H_{4}P_{2}O_{7}	Pyrophosphoric acid (diphosphoric acid)	P_{2}O^{4−}_{7}	Pyrophosphate (diphosphate)
15	Phosphorus	+5	H_{3}PO_{5}	Peroxomonophosphoric acid	PO^{3−}_{3}	Peroxomonophosphate
15	Phosphorus	+5, +3	(HO)_{2}POPO(OH)_{2}	Diphosphoric(III,V) acid	O_{2}POPOO^{2−}_{2}	Diphosphate(III,V)
15	Phosphorus	+4	(HO)_{2}OPPO(OH)_{2}	Hypophosphoric acid (diphosphoric(IV) acid)	O_{2}OPPOO^{4−}_{2}	Hypophosphate (diphosphate(IV))
15	Phosphorus	+3	H_{2}PHO_{3}	Phosphonic acid	PHO^{2−}_{3}	Phosphonate
15	Phosphorus	+3	H_{2}P_{2}H_{2}O_{5}	Diphosphonic acid	P_{2}H_{2}O^{5−}_{3}	Diphosphonate
15	Phosphorus	+1	HPH_{2}O_{2}	Phosphinic acid (hypophosphorous acid)	PH_{2}O^{−}_{2}	Phosphinate (hypophosphite)
15	Arsenic	+5	H_{3}AsO_{4}	Arsenic acid	AsO^{3−}_{4}	Arsenate
15	Arsenic	+3	H_{3}AsO_{3}	Arsenous acid	AsO^{3−}_{3}	Arsenite
16	Sulfur	+6	H_{2}SO_{4}	Sulfuric acid	SO^{2−}_{4}	Sulfate
16	Sulfur	+6	H_{2}S_{2}O_{7}	Disulfuric acid	S_{2}O^{2−}_{7}	Disulfate
16	Sulfur	+6	H_{2}SO_{5}	Peroxomonosulfuric acid	SO^{2−}_{5}	Peroxomonosulfate
16	Sulfur	+6	H_{2}S_{2}O_{8}	Peroxodisulfuric acid	S_{2}O^{2−}_{8}	Peroxodisulfate
16	Sulfur	+5	H_{2}S_{2}O_{6}	Dithionic acid	S_{2}O^{2−}_{6}	Dithionate
16	Sulfur	+5, 0	H_{2}S_{x}O_{6}	Polythionic acids (x = 3, 4...)	S_{x}O^{2−}_{6}	Polythionates
16	Sulfur	+4	H_{2}SO_{3}	Sulfurous acid	SO^{2−}_{3}	Sulfite
16	Sulfur	+4	H_{2}S_{2}O_{5}	Disulfurous acid	S_{2}O^{2−}_{5}	Disulfite
16	Sulfur	+4, 0	H_{2}S_{2}O_{3}	Thiosulfuric acid	S_{2}O^{2−}_{3}	Thiosulfate
16	Sulfur	+3	H_{2}S_{2}O_{4}	Dithionous acid	S_{2}O^{2−}_{4}	Dithionite
16	Sulfur	+3, −1	HOSOSH	Thiosulfurous acid	OSOS^{2−}	Thiosulfite
16	Sulfur	+2	H_{2}SO_{2}	Sulfoxylic acid (hyposulfurous acid)	SO^{2−}_{2}	Sulfoxylate (hyposulfite)
16	Sulfur	+1	HOSSOH	Dihydroxydisulfane	OSSO^{2−}	Disulfanediolate
16	Sulfur	0	HSOH	Sulfenic acid	HSO^{−}	Sulfinite
16	Selenium	+6	H_{2}SeO_{4}	Selenic acid	SeO^{2−}_{4}	Selenate
16	Selenium	+4	H_{2}SeO_{3}	Selenous acid	SeO^{2−}_{3}	Selenite
16	Tellurium	+6	H_{2}TeO_{4}	Telluric acid	TeO^{2−}_{4}	Tellurate
16	Tellurium	+6	H_{6}TeO_{6}	Orthotelluric acid	TeO^{6−}_{6}	Orthotellurate
16	Tellurium	+4	H_{2}TeO_{3}	Tellurous acid	TeO^{2−}_{3}	Tellurite
17	Chlorine	+7	HClO_{4}	Perchloric acid	ClO^{−}_{4}	Perchlorate
17	Chlorine	+5	HClO_{3}	Chloric acid	ClO^{−}_{3}	Chlorate
17	Chlorine	+3	HClO_{2}	Chlorous acid	ClO^{−}_{2}	Chlorite
17	Chlorine	+1	HClO	Hypochlorous acid	ClO^{−}	Hypochlorite
17	Bromine	+7	HBrO_{4}	Perbromic acid	BrO^{−}_{4}	Perbromate
17	Bromine	+5	HBrO_{3}	Bromic acid	BrO^{−}_{3}	Bromate
17	Bromine	+3	HBrO_{2}	Bromous acid	BrO^{−}_{2}	Bromite
17	Bromine	+1	HBrO	Hypobromous acid	BrO^{−}	Hypobromite
17	Iodine	+7	HIO_{4}	Periodic acid	IO^{−}_{4}	Periodate
17	Iodine	+7	H_{5}IO_{6}	Orthoperiodic acid	IO^{5−}_{6}	Orthoperiodate
17	Iodine	+5	HIO_{3}	Iodic acid	IO^{−}_{3}	Iodate
17	Iodine	+1	HIO	Hypoiodous acid	IO^{−}	Hypoiodite
18	Xenon	+6	H_{2}XeO_{4}	Xenic acid	HXeO_{4}^{–}	Hydrogenxenate (dibasic xenate is unknown)
18	Xenon	+8	H_{4}XeO_{6}	Perxenic acid	XeO_{6}^{4–}	Perxenate

== Sources ==
- Kivinen, Antti; Mäkitie, Osmo (1988). Kemia (in Finnish). Helsinki, Finland: Otava. ISBN 951-1-10136-6.
- Otavan suuri ensyklopedia, volume 2 (Cid-Harvey) (in Finnish). Helsinki, Finland: Otava. 1977. ISBN 951-1-04170-3.

== See also ==
- Weak acid
- Hypohalous acid
- Sulfur oxoacid
- Sulphuric acid
