= Sulfur oxoacid =

Acid containing sulfur, oxygen, and hydrogen

Sulfur oxoacids are chemical compounds that contain sulfur, oxygen, and hydrogen. The best known and most important industrially used is sulfuric acid. Sulfur has several oxoacids; however, some of these are known only from their salts (these are shown in italics in the table below). The acids that have been characterised contain a variety of structural features, for example:

- tetrahedral sulfur when coordinated to oxygen
- terminal and bridging oxygen atoms
- terminal peroxo groups
- terminal S=S
- chains of (−S−)_{n}

Acid	Formula	Formal oxidation number	Structure	Related anions	Notes
Sulfuric acid	H_{2}SO_{4}	+6	sulfuric	Sulfate, SO^{2−}_{4} and hydrogen sulfate commonly known as bisulfate, HSO^{−}_{4}	Best known and industrially significant.
Polysulfuric acids including disulfuric acid (pyrosulfuric acid)	H_{2}SO_{4}·nSO_{3}	+6	disulfuric	Disulfate (commonly known as pyrosulfate), S_{2}O^{2−}_{7} and trisulfate, S_{3}O^{2−}_{10}	Pure disulfuric acid melts at 36 °C. Present in fuming sulfuric acid, oleum. Examples known for n = 1 and n = 2.
Peroxymonosulfuric acid	H_{2}SO_{5}	+6	peroxymonosulfuric	Peroxomonosulfate, OOSO^{2−}_{3}	"Caro's acid", a solid melting at 45 °C
Peroxydisulfuric acid	H_{2}S_{2}O_{8}	+6	peroxydisulfuric	Peroxydisulfate, O_{3}SOOSO^{2−}_{3}	"Marshall's acid", a solid melting at 65 °C.
Dithionic acid	H_{2}S_{2}O_{6}	+5	dithionic	Dithionate, O_{3}SSO^{2−}_{3}	Not isolated in pure form, only concentrated solutions have been prepared
Thiosulfuric acid	H_{2}S_{2}O_{3}	0 (for the terminal sulfur), +4 (for the central atom)	thiosulfuric	Thiosulfate, S_{2}O^{2−}_{3} Hydrogenthiosulfate HS_{2}O^{−}_{3} (ammonium salt prepared in anhydrous methanol at −80 °C)	Aqueous solutions decompose.
Disulfurous acid or pyrosulfurous acid	H_{2}S_{2}O_{5}	+5 (of the sulfur atom bonded to 3 oxygen atoms), +3 (of other sulfur atom)	disulfurous	Disulfite commonly known as metabisulfite, S_{2}O^{2−}_{5}	Not known.
Sulfurous acid	H_{2}SO_{3}	+4	sulfurous	Bisulfite, HSO^{−}_{3} and sulfite, SO^{2−}_{3}	Not known.
Dithionous acid	H_{2}S_{2}O_{4}	+3	dithionous	Dithionite, O_{2}SSO^{2−}_{2}	Not known.
Sulfoxylic acid	H_{2}SO_{2}	+2	sulfoxylic	Sulfoxylate, SO^{2−}_{2}	Free acid not known
Polythionic acid	H_{2}S_{x}O_{6}	0 (for the bridging S atoms), +5 (for the terminal central S atoms)	polythionic	Polythionates, O_{3}S(S_{x−2})SO^{2−}_{3}. Example trithionate, tetrathionate, pentathionate, hexathionate, heptathionate, octathionate, nonathionate, decathionate, undecathionate, dodecathionate, tridecathionate, and tetradecathionate.	Examples known with x = 3, 4, 5, 6, 7, 8, 10, 12, 14.
Thiosulfurous acid	H_{2}S_{2}O_{2}	−1 (for the exterior sulfur atom ), +3 (for the central atom)		Thiosulfites	Not known
Dihydroxydisulfane	H_{2}S_{2}O_{2}	+1	hypodithionous		Acid known

== See also ==
- Chlorosulfuric acid
- Fluorosulfuric acid
- Nitrosylsulfuric acid
- Peroxydisulfuric acid
- Sulfinic acids
- Sulfonic acids
