= Nitrogen acid =

Nitrogen acid may refer to:

- Nitric acid, HNO_{3}
- Nitrous acid, HNO_{2}
- Hyponitrous acid, H_{2}N_{2}O_{2}

or the less common nitrogen species:

- Nitroxyl, HNO
- Nitroxylic acid, H_{4}N_{2}O_{4}
- Peroxynitrous acid, HOONO
- Peroxynitric acid, HOONO_{2}
