= H2N2O2 =

The molecular formula H_{2}N_{2}O_{2} (molar mass: 62.03 g/mol) may refer to:

- Hyponitrite ion
- Hyponitrous acid
- Nitramide
