= NO4 =

NO4 may refer to

- Orthonitrate, a chemical ion composed of nitrogen and oxygen with a 3− charge
- Peroxynitrate, another chemical ion composed of nitrogen and oxygen with a 1− charge
