= Silver hyponitrite =

Names
- Other names Silver(I) hyponitrite, Argentous hyponitrite

Identifiers
| 3D model (JSmol) | Interactive image |
| ChemSpider | 66738928 |
| PubChem CID | 129635977 |
| CompTox Dashboard (EPA) | DTXSID701337128 |
- InChI: InChI=1S/2Ag.H2N2O2/c;;3-1-2-4/h;;(H,1,4)(H,2,3)/q2*+1;/p-2 Key: WFHLUHLBCCOOIU-UHFFFAOYSA-L
- SMILES: N(=N[O-])[O-].[Ag+].[Ag+]

Properties
| Chemical formula | Ag_{2}N_{2}O_{2} |
| Molar mass | 275.75 |
| Appearance | bright canary yellow solid |
| Density | 5.75 g/cm3 (at 30 °C) |
| Solubility in water | slightly soluble |
- Except where otherwise noted, data are given for materials in their standard state (at 25 °C [77 °F], 100 kPa). Infobox references

Silver hyponitrite is an ionic compound with formula Ag_{2}N_{2}O_{2} or (Ag^{+})_{2}[ON=NO]^{2−}, containing monovalent silver cations and hyponitrite anions. It is a bright yellow solid practically insoluble in water and most organic solvents, including DMF and DMSO.

== Preparation ==
The compound was described in 1848.

The salt can be precipitated from a solution of sodium hyponitrite in water by the addition of silver nitrate:

Na_{2}N_{2}O_{2} + 2 AgNO_{3} → Ag_{2}N_{2}O_{2} + 2 NaNO_{3}

Excess silver nitrate yields a brown or black precipitate.

Silver hyponitrite can also be prepared by reacting silver nitrate with sodium amalgam.

== Properties and reactions ==
Silver hyponitrite is sparingly soluble in concentrated alkali hyponitrite solutions, but quite soluble in aqueous ammonia due to the formation of the complex cation [(NH_{3})_{2}Ag]^{+}. The compound is slowly decomposed by light.

The anhydrous compound decomposes in vacuum at 158 °C. The primary decomposition products are silver(I) oxide Ag_{2}O and nitrous oxide N_{2}O. However, these then react to form a variable mixture of nitrogen, metallic silver, and various oxides of the two elements and silver salts.

=== Hyponitrous acid ===
Reaction of silver hyponitrite with anhydrous hydrogen chloride in ether is the standard way to prepare hyponitrous acid:

Ag_{2}N_{2}O_{2} + 2 HCl → H_{2}N_{2}O_{2} + 2 AgCl

Spectroscopic data indicate a trans configuration for the resulting acid.

=== Alkyl halides ===
Silver hyponitrite reacts with alkyl halides, to form alkyl hyponitrites. For example, reaction with methyl bromide yields the spontaneously explosive dimethyl hyponitrite:

2 CH_{3}Br + Ag_{2}N_{2}O_{2} → H_{3}C-O-N=N-O-CH_{3} + 2 AgBr

Other alkyl hyponitrites reported in the literature include those of ethyl, benzyl, and tert-butyl.
