= Polysulfane =

Class of chemical compounds

A polysulfane is a chemical compound of formula H_{2}S_{n}, where n > 1 (although disulfane (H_{2}S_{2}) is sometimes excluded). Compounds containing 2 – 8 sulfur atoms have been isolated, longer chain compounds have been detected, but only in solution. H_{2}S_{2} is colourless, higher members are yellow with the colour increasing with the sulfur content. In the chemical literature, the term polysulfane is sometimes used for compounds containing −(S)_{n}−, e.g. organic polysulfanes R^{1}−(S)_{n}−R^{2}, but this category of organic compound is more typically referred to as a polysulfide.

== Structures ==
Polysulfanes consist of unbranched chains of sulfur atoms terminated with hydrogen atoms. The branched isomer of tetrasulfane H_{2}S_{4}, in which the fourth sulfur is bonded to the central sulfur, would be described as trithiosulfurous acid, S=S(−SH)_{2}. Computations suggests that it is less stable than the linear isomer HS−S−S−SH. The S-S-S angles approach 90° in trisulfane H_{2}S_{3} and higher polysulfanes.

== Reactions and properties ==
Polysulfanes can easily be oxidised, and are thermodynamically unstable with respect to decomposition (disproportionation) readily to H_{2}S and sulfur:

8 H_{2}S_{n} → 8 H_{2}S + (n − 1) S_{8} (in this chemical reaction, S_{8} is cyclo-octasulfur, one of the allotropes of sulfur)

This decomposition reaction is catalyzed by alkali. To suppress this behavior, containers for polysulfanes are often pretreated with acid to remove traces of alkali.

In contrast to the thermodynamic instability of polysulfates, polysulfide anions form spontaneously by treatment of S^{2−} with elemental sulfur:

S^{2−} + (n − 1) S → [S_{n}]^{2−}

Beyond H_{2}S and H_{2}S_{2}, many higher polysulfanes H_{2}S_{n} (n = 3 – 8) are known. They have unbranched sulfur chains. Starting with disulfane H_{2}S_{2}, all known polysulfanes are liquids at room temperature. The density, boiling point and viscosity correlate with chain length. Physical properties of polysulfanes are given in the table below.

Chemical formula	Name	Density at 20 °C (g/cm^{3})	Vapour pressure	Extrapolated boiling point
H_{2}S	Sulfane	1.363 g/dm^{3} (gas)	1740 (kPa, 21 °C) (gas)	−60 °C (−76 °F)
H_{2}S_{2}	Disulfane	1.334	87.7 mmHg (11,690 Pa)	70 °C (158 °F)
H_{2}S_{3}	Trisulfane	1.491	1.4 mmHg (190 Pa)	170 °C (338 °F)
H_{2}S_{4}	Tetrasulfane	1.582	0.035 mmHg (4.7 Pa)	240 °C (464 °F)
H_{2}S_{5}	Pentasulfane	1.644	0.0012 mmHg (0.16 Pa)	285 °C (545 °F)
H_{2}S_{6}	Hexasulfane	1.688	?	?
H_{2}S_{7}	Heptasulfane	1.721	?	?
H_{2}S_{8}	Octasulfane	1.747	?	?

They also react with sulfite and cyanide producing thiosulfate and thiocyanate respectively.

Polysulfanes can be made from polysulfides by pouring a solution of a polysulfide salt into cooled concentrated hydrochloric acid. A mixture of metastable polysulfanes separates as a yellow oil, from which individual compounds may be separated by fractional distillation. Other more selective syntheses are:

Na_{2}S_{n} + 2 HCl → 2 NaCl + H_{2}S_{n} (n = 4, 5, 6)
S_{n}Cl_{2} + 2 H_{2}S_{m} → 2 HCl + H_{2}S_{n+2m}

The reaction of polysulfanes with sulfur dichloride or disulfur dichloride produces long-chain dichloropolysulfanes:

2 SCl_{2} + H_{2}S_{n} → 2 HCl + S_{2+n}Cl_{2}
2 S_{2}Cl_{2} + H_{2}S_{n} → 2 HCl + S_{4+n}Cl_{2}

The reaction with a sulfite salt (a base) quantitatively decomposes the polysulfane to produce thiosulfate and hydrogen sulfide:

(n − 1) SO^{2−}_{3} + H_{2}S_{n} → (n − 1) S_{2}O^{2−}_{3} + H_{2}S

Polysulfanes are produced in biology via oxidation of H_{2}S. As catenated sulfur species with a terminal hydropersulfide (-SSH) group, polysulfanes in aqueous solution at physiological pH self-react, resulting in a complex equilibrium of polysulfane species. Polysulfanes are truncated in biological milieu by H_{2}S/HS^{–} and thiols, forming hydropersulfides/hydropolysulfides and polysulfides. Some representative reactions are below:

HSS_{n}SH ⇌ HSS_{n}S^{–} + HSS_{n}SH ⇌ HSS_{n}SS_{n}SH + HS^{–}

HSSSSH + HS^{–} ⇌ HSSH + HSSS^{–}

HSS_{n}SH + RSH ⇌ H_{2}S + H_{2}S_{2} + ... + H_{2}SS_{n} + RSSH + RSSSH + ... + RSS_{n}SH

== See also ==
- Hydrogen polyoxide − oxygen analogues
- Polythionates
