= Hyponitrite =

Ion, and compounds containing the ion

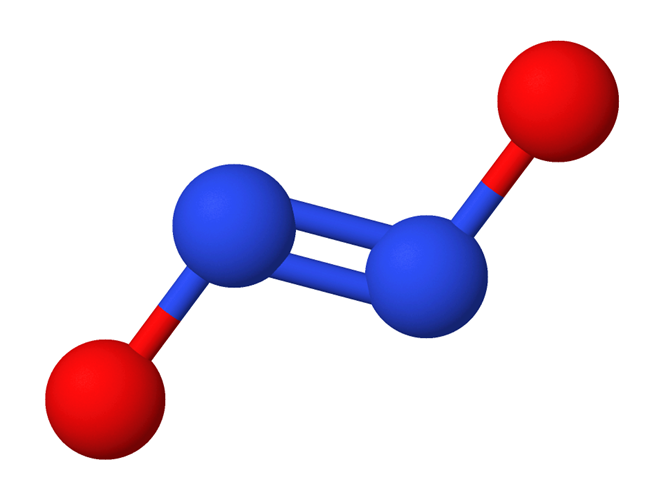
trans (E) hyponitrite
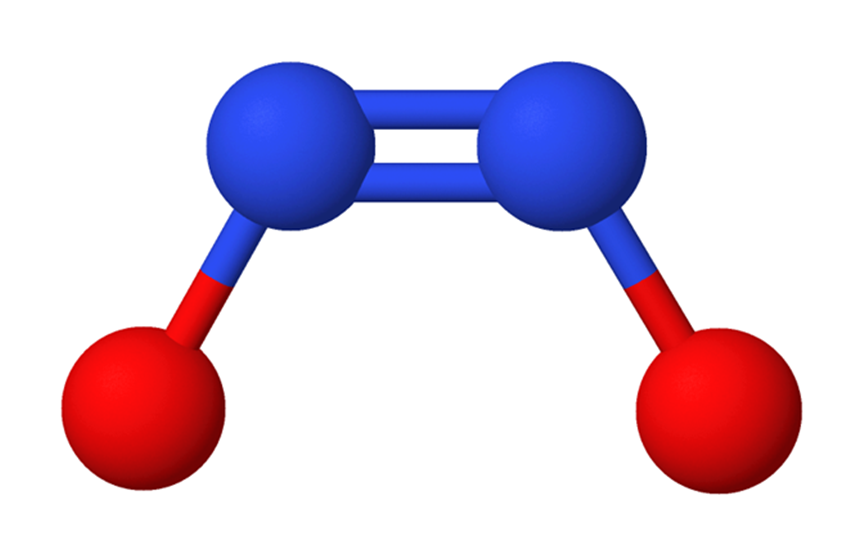
cis (Z) hyponitrite

Names
- Preferred IUPAC name Hyponitrite
- Systematic IUPAC name Diazenebis(olate)
- Other names Hyponitrite(2–)

Identifiers
3D model (JSmol)	(E): Interactive image; (Z): Interactive image
ChEBI	CHEBI:18210
ChemSpider	3874228 (?)
Gmelin Reference	130273
PubChem CID	6185901 (E); 4686309 (unassigned stereochemistry)
- InChI: InChI=1S/H2N2O2/c3-1-2-4/h(H,1,4)(H,2,3)/p-2 Key: NFMHSPWHNQRFNR-UHFFFAOYSA-L
- SMILES: (E): [O-]/N=N/[O-]; (Z): [O-]\N=N/[O-]

Properties
Chemical formula	N_{2}O^{2−}_{2}
Molar mass	60.012 g·mol^{−1}
Conjugate acid	Hyponitrous acid
- Except where otherwise noted, data are given for materials in their standard state (at 25 °C [77 °F], 100 kPa). Infobox references

In chemistry, hyponitrite may refer to the anion N_{2}O^{2−}_{2} ([ON=NO]^{2−}), or to any ionic compound that contains it. In organic chemistry, it may also refer to the group −O−N=N−O−, or any organic compound with the generic formula R^{1}−O−N=N−O−R^{2}, where R^{1} and R^{2} are organic groups. Such compounds can be viewed as salts and esters of hyponitrous acid. An acid hyponitrite is an ionic compound with the anion HN_{2}O^{−}_{2} ([HON=NO]^{−}).

== Hyponitrite ion ==
Hyponitrite exhibits cis–trans isomerism.

The trans (E) form is generally found in hyponitrite salts such as sodium hyponitrite (Na_{2}N_{2}O_{2}) and silver(I) hyponitrite (Ag_{2}N_{2}O_{2}).

The cis (Z) form of sodium hyponitrite can be obtained too, but it is more reactive than the trans form. The cis hyponitrite anion is nearly planar and almost symmetric, with lengths of about 140 pm for N−O bond and 120 pm for the N−N bond, and O−N−N angles of about 119°.

=== Reactions ===
The hyponitrite ions can act as a bidentate ligand in either bridging or chelating mode. There is a bridging cis-hyponitrite group in the red dinuclear form of nitrosyl pentammine cobalt(III) chloride, [Co(NH_{3})_{5}NO]Cl_{2}.

Hyponitrite can reduce elemental iodine to hydroiodic acid:

N_{2}O^{2−}_{2} + 3 I_{2} + 3 H_{2}O → NO^{−}_{3} + NO^{−}_{2} + 6 HI

== Hyponitrite esters ==
Organic trans-hyponitrites R^{1}−O−N=N−O−R^{2} can be obtained by reacting trans silver(I) hyponitrite Ag_{2}N_{2}O_{2} with various alkyl halides. For example, reaction with tert-butyl chloride yields trans di-tert-butyl hyponitrite.

Other alkyl radicals reported in the literature include ethyl, and benzyl. These compounds can be a source of alkoxyl radicals.

== See also ==
Other nitrogen oxyanions include

- nitrate, NO^{−}_{3}
- nitrite, NO^{−}_{2}
- peroxonitrite, (peroxynitrite), OONO^{−}
- peroxonitrate, HNO^{−}_{4}
- trioxodinitrate, (hyponitrate), [ON=NO_{2}]^{2−}
- nitroxylate, [O_{2}N−NO_{2}]^{4−}
- orthonitrate, NO^{3−}_{4}
