= Tetrasulfane =

Chemical compound

Names
- Other names: Dihydrogen tetrasulfide

Identifiers
3D model (JSmol)	Interactive image
ChEBI	CHEBI:50364
ChemSpider	74749
Gmelin Reference	184498
PubChem CID	82836
- InChI: InChI=1S/H2S4/c1-3-4-2/h1-2H Key: IKRMQEUTISXXQP-UHFFFAOYSA-N
- SMILES: SSSS

Properties
Chemical formula	H_{2}S_{4}
Molar mass	130.26 g·mol^{−1}
- Except where otherwise noted, data are given for materials in their standard state (at 25 °C [77 °F], 100 kPa). Infobox references

Tetrasulfane (S_{4}H_{2}) is an inorganic chemical compound featuring a disulfide and two thiol groups.

== Production ==
Similar to other polysulfanes, it can be made by neutralizing the given polysulfane salt with an acid, such as HCl or H_{2}SO_{4}. Example given with HCl and Na_{2}S_{4}:

Na_{2}S_{4} + 2 HCl → 2 NaCl + H_{2}S_{4}

== Physical properties ==
Same as other polysulfanes, tetrasulfane it is a yellowish, oily liquid. Its density is around 1.5 g/cm^{3} (±0.1 g/cm^{3}).

== Related compounds ==
- Trisulfane
- Disulfane
- Hydrogen sulfide
