= Sulfoxylic acid =

Unstable oxoacid of sulfur

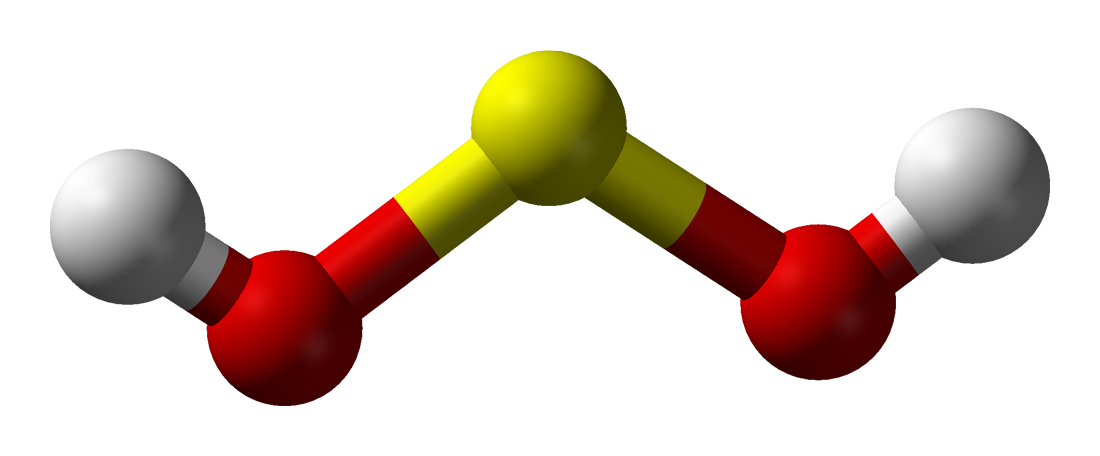
- 3D ball model of sulfoxylic acid

Names
- IUPAC name Sulfanediol
- Other names hyposulfurous acid sulfur dihydroxide dihydroxidosulfur sulfanediol 2-Thiatrioxidane

Identifiers
CAS Number	20196-46-7
3D model (JSmol)	Interactive image
ChEBI	CHEBI:33536
ChemSpider	4574173
Gmelin Reference	1452
PubChem CID	5460696
CompTox Dashboard (EPA)	DTXSID201316909
- InChI: InChI=1S/H2O2S/c1-3-2/h1-2H Key: HRKQOINLCJTGBK-UHFFFAOYSA-N
- SMILES: OSO

Properties
Chemical formula	S(OH)_{2}
Molar mass	66.07 g·mol^{−1}
Conjugate base	Bisulfoxylate (chemical formula SO_{2}H^{−})

Related compounds
Related isoelectronic	trioxidane trisulfane
Related compounds	hydroxysulfonyl radical HOSO_{2} sulfinic acid sulfenic acid HSOH dihydroxydisulfane HOSSOH
- Except where otherwise noted, data are given for materials in their standard state (at 25 °C [77 °F], 100 kPa). Infobox references

Sulfoxylic acid (H_{2}SO_{2}) (also known as hyposulfurous acid or sulfur dihydroxide) is an unstable oxoacid of sulfur in an intermediate oxidation state between hydrogen sulfide and dithionous acid. It consists of two hydroxy groups attached to a sulfur atom. Sulfoxylic acid contains sulfur in an oxidation state of +2. Sulfur monoxide (SO) can be considered as a theoretical anhydride for sulfoxylic acid, but it is not actually known to react with water.

The complementary base is the sulfoxylate anion SO^{2−}_{2}, which is much more stable. Between these states lies the HSO^{−}_{2} ion, which is also somewhat stable.

Sulfoxylate ions can be made by decomposing thiourea dioxide in an alkaline solution. To do this, thiourea dioxide first forms an amidine-sulfinic acid tautomer, H_{2}NC(=NH)SO_{2}H, which then breaks apart. Sulfoxylate reacts with formaldehyde to yield a hydroxymethanesulfinate called rongalite:

HSO^{−}_{2} + H_{2}CO → HOCH_{2}SO^{−}_{2},

which is an important chemical for dyeing.

== Formation ==
Sulfoxylic acid has been detected in the gas phase. It is likely to be formed as an intermediate when hydrogen sulfide is oxidised by living organisms, or in the atmosphere, or anywhere else in the natural environment. It may also exist in circumstellar disks. When H_{2}S is oxidised it starts from oxidation state −2, and should then pass through intermediate values of 0 and +2 before getting to well known sulfite at +4 and sulfate at +6. When sulfide in alkaline conditions is oxidised by air in the presence of nickel ions, sulfoxylate concentration first increases to around 5% and then decreases over several days. Polysulfide concentration also grows and then shrinks on a slower timescale, reaching about 25% of the sulfide. The sulfur ends up forming thiosulfate.

Sulfoxylic acid has been made by ultraviolet irradiation of a mixture of solid H_{2}S and H_{2}O, followed by warming. This is a possible natural process in comets or circumstellar disks.

Fender et al. claimed to make "sulfinic acid" (an isomer of sulfoxylic acid) by ultraviolet irradiation on solid sulfur dioxide and hydrogen sulfide in a solid argon matrix, measuring the infrared vibrational spectrum. However, the assignment of the lines in the spectrum is doubtful, so this may not be the substance produced.

Sulfoxylic acid can be made in the gas phase in an electric discharge through a neon, H_{2}, SO_{2} mixture. This also yields some sulfhydryl hydroperoxide.

== Properties ==
Sulfoxylic acid is an isomer of sulfinic acid, which has a hydrogen atom bonded to the sulfur, and the oxygen connected with a double bond (HS(O)OH). Other isomers are thiadioxirane (a ring of two oxygen atoms and a sulfur), dihydrogen sulfone (a sulfur atom linked to two hydrogen and two oxygen atoms), sulfhydryl hydroperoxide (HSOOH), and dihydrogen persulfoxide H_{2}SOO. Sulfoxylic acid has the lowest energy of any of these isomers.

The pK_{a1} of sulfoxylic acid is 7.97. The pK_{a2} of bisulfoxylate (HSO^{−}_{2}) is 13.55.

Calculations of the molecule suggest there may be two alignments termed C_{2}, and C_{s}. The H−O distance is 96.22 (or 96.16) pm, S−O distance is 163.64 (or 163.67) pm, ∠HOS = 108.14° (108.59°), ∠OSO = 103.28° (103.64°) HOSO twist is 84.34° (+90.56 and −90.56) (C_{s} dimensions in parentheses).

The microwave spectrum has absorption lines at 10.419265, 12.2441259, 14.0223698, 16.3161779 GHz and many others for the C_{s} and 12.8910254, 19.4509030, 21.4709035, 24.7588445, 29.5065050, 29.5848250, 32.8772050 GHz for the C_{2} form.

The sulfoxylate ion apparently has an X-ray absorption near edge structure at 2476.1 eV. With sulfur the X-ray absorption edge changes with oxidation state as per Kunzl's law. The edge corresponds to the energy needed to excite an inner ^{1}S electron to a ^{3}P orbital. Sulfoxylate has an infrared absorption peak at 918.2 cm^{−1}.

== Reactions ==
Sulfoxylic acid disproportionates into sulfur and hydrogensulfite HSO^{−}_{3}. Some of this in turn reacts to form thiosulfate S_{2}O^{2−}_{3}.

Sulfoxylates are sensitive to air and will be oxidised by the oxygen in it.

Sulfoxylate is oxidised to sulfur dioxide radical anion and then to sulfur dioxide.

SO^{2−}_{2} + O_{2} → SO^{•−}_{2} + O^{•−}_{2}

SO^{•−}_{2} + O_{2} → SO_{2} + O^{•−}_{2}

2 SO^{•−}_{2} ⇌ S_{2}O^{2−}_{4} (dithionite)

The known sulfoxylate salts include cobalt sulfoxylate CoSO_{2}·3H_{2}O. This can dissolve in an ammoniacal solution. However, cobalt sulfide will precipitate if sulfide is formed during a reaction.

Sulfoxylate in solution reacts with thiosulfate to form sulfides and sulfites.

Sulfoxylate reduces nitrite to hydronitrite radical dianion NO^{•2−}_{2}. This, in turn, reacts with water, forming hydroxide ions and nitric oxide (NO). Nitric oxide and nitrous oxide N_{2}O in turn are further reduced by sulfoxylate.

When sulfoxylate reacts with hypochlorite, bromine or chlorine dioxide it forms hydrogen sulfite and sulfates.

Dithionite is unstable in a pH 4 solution, decomposing to sulfoxylic acid and hydrogen sulfite. This sulfoxylic acid reacts with more dithionite to yield more hydrogen sulfite, some sulfur, and a small amount of thiosulfate.

S_{2}O^{2−}_{4} + H^{+} → H_{2}SO_{2} + HSO^{−}_{3}

S_{2}O^{2−}_{4} + H_{2}SO_{2} → 2 HSO^{−}_{3} + S

S_{2}O^{2−}_{4} + H_{2}SO_{2} → HSO^{−}_{3} + S_{2}O^{2−}_{3} + H^{+}

By reducing sulfur dioxide, hydrogen sulfoxylate forms as an intermediate, and this is much more reactive. Hydrogen sulfoxylate reacts with organic compounds with a double bond (vinyls) to make an organic sulfinate. Hydrogen sulfoxylate reacts with divinyl sulfone to make 1,4-dithiane 1,1,4,4-tetroxide. Perfluorophenyl iodide is reduced to pentafluorobenzene.

The reaction of sulfoxylic acid with sulfite yields trithionate (S_{3}O^{2−}_{6}) and with thiosulfate yields pentathionate (S_{5}O^{2−}_{6}).

== Salts ==
Salts of sulfoxylic acid that have been claimed to have been made include those of cobalt, thallium, and zinc. Cobalt sulfoxylate is made from sodium hyposulfite, cobalt chloride and ammonia. Zinc sulfoxylate is produced by reacting zinc metal with sulfuryl chloride.

Thallous sulfoxylate is made by allowing oxygen onto thallous sulfide. This is olive brown in colour. When heated to 250 °C, it recrystallizes to another yellow form.

Cuprous sulfoxylate Cu_{2}SO_{2} can be made as a solid or liquid by heating cuprous sulfide and copper sulfate. Cu_{2}SO_{2} melts at 610 K (337 °C) and is stable as a liquid phase to over 680K. There are also solid phase transitions at 382 K (109 °C) and 423 K (150 °C).

== Derivatives ==
Sulfoxylic acid forms a wide variety of organic esters of the form R–O–S–O–R′.

The nomenclature for these molecules is not entirely standardized, and a wide variety of IUPAC-acceptable names are possible. For substances with the −OSOH group, one can use suffixes ‑oxysulfanol (preferred), ‑hydrogen sulfoxylate, or ‑oxysulfenic acid; or prefixes hydroxysulfanyloxy- (preferred) or sulfenooxy-. The ionic group –OSO^{−} can use the preferred suffix ‑oxysulfanolate or ‑sulfoxylate; or preferred prefix oxysulfanolato- or sulfenatooxy-. The R-OSO-R' can be suffixed with ‑dioxysulfane or ‑sulfoxylate; or prefixed with oxysulfanyloxy- or sulfenooxy-.

In general, sulfoxylate esters are synthesized from sulfur dichloride and a primary or secondary alcohol, to give a diorganyl sulfoxylate (ROSOR) compound. Because sulfur dichloride unavoidably forms some disulfur dichloride and chlorine in solution, this technique also forms di(organyloxy) disulfides and dialkyl sulfites. The yield of sulfoxylates is maximised at low temperatures (around -75 °C) and with dilute reactants. Successfully synthesized compounds include the methyl, ethyl, propyl, isopropyl, n-butyl, n-pentyl, and cholesterol esters, as well as the hemiester para‑(hydroxysulfanyl)cresol (i.e., 1‑hydroxysulfanyloxy-4‑methylbenzene). With 1,2‑diols, SCl_{2} forms polymeric sulfoxylates; for 1,3-diols, SCl_{2} reaction creates cyclic oligomers (typically, a six-member 1,3,2-dioxathiane or a twelve-membered cyclic sulfoxylate dimer). Allylic, propargylic, or benzylic sulfoxylate esters are generally unstable, rearranging to give a sulfinate ester; although they are stable at −18 °C if chloride is promptly removed from the solution. The rearrangement appears to develop a temporary positive charge on the organyl group, as it is inhibited at the benzyl position of electron-poor arenes.

Diethylsulfoxylate can be made by reacting diethoxydisulfide with sodium ethoxide.

Sulfoxylic acid dimethyl ester (also called dimethylsulfoxylate or dimethoxysulfane) (S(OCH_{3})_{2}) has been studied using electron diffraction, X-ray crystallography, Raman spectroscopy, and infrared spectroscopy. Studying this molecule is much easier than the unstable sulfoxylic acid. It is a liquid at standard conditions that boils at 74 °C and freezes at -67° In the gas state the molecular bond angle ∠OSO is 103°, with the oxygen-sulfur distance 1.625 Å. The oxygen-carbon distance is 1.426 Å and carbon-hydrogen distance 1.105 Å with ∠COS 115.9° and ∠COS 109°. The molecule as C_{2} symmetry with one methyl group rotated above the plane determined by the OSO atoms, and the other below. The C−O−S−O dihedral angle is about 84°. The energy barrier to moving one methyl group to the other side of the plane is 37 kJ/mol, and it would be in a 12 kJ/mol higher energy state in this C_{s} symmetry state.
