= Hyponitrite reductase =

hyponitrite reductase

Identifiers
- EC no.: 1.7.1.5
- CAS no.: 9029-30-5

Databases
- IntEnz: IntEnz view
- BRENDA: BRENDA entry
- ExPASy: NiceZyme view
- KEGG: KEGG entry
- MetaCyc: metabolic pathway
- PRIAM: profile
- PDB structures: RCSB PDB PDBe PDBsum
- Gene Ontology: AmiGO / QuickGO
Search
- PMC: articles
- PubMed: articles
- NCBI: proteins

In enzymology, a hyponitrite reductase is an enzyme that catalyzes the oxidation of hydroxylamine H_{2}NOH by the nicotinamide adenine dinucleotide cation (NAD^{+}) into hyponitrous acid HON=NOH:

2 H_{2}NOH + 2 NAD^{+} $\rightleftharpoons$ HON=NOH + 2 NADH + 2 H^{+}

This systematic name of this enzyme class hydroxylamine:NAD+ oxidoreductase. It is also called NADH2:hyponitrite oxidoreductase.

This enzyme belongs to the family of oxidoreductases, specifically those acting on other nitrogenous compounds as donors with NAD+ or NADP+ as acceptor. It employs one cofactor, metal.
