= Trisulfane =

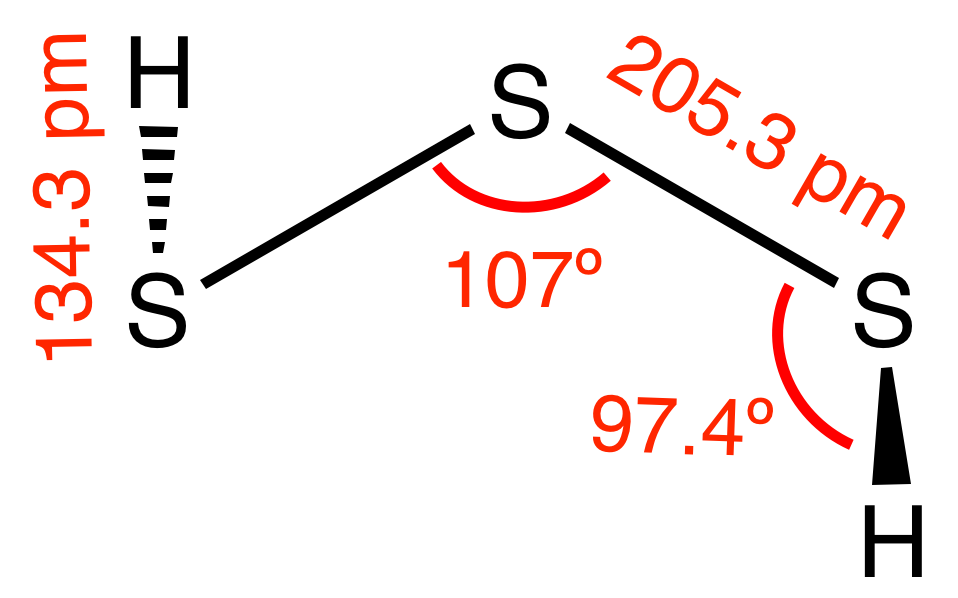

Names
- Systematic IUPAC name Trisulfane

Identifiers
CAS Number	13845-23-3
3D model (JSmol)	Interactive image
Beilstein Reference	3903006
ChEBI	CHEBI:50365
ChEMBL	ChEMBL1235793
ChemSpider	145860
Gmelin Reference	25473
PubChem CID	166718
CompTox Dashboard (EPA)	DTXSID80925328
- InChI: InChI=1S/H2S3/c1-3-2/h1-2H Key: KBMBVTRWEAAZEY-UHFFFAOYSA-N
- SMILES: SSS

Properties
Chemical formula	H_{2}S_{3}
Molar mass	98.20 g·mol^{−1}
Appearance	yellow liquid
Odor	camphor-like
Density	1.495 g/cm^{3} (15 °C)
Melting point	−53 °C (−63 °F; 220 K)
Boiling point	170 °C (338 °F; 443 K)
Solubility in water	low
log P	1.237
Acidity (pK_{a})	5.826
Basicity (pK_{b})	8.171

Related compounds
Related isoelectronic	Trioxidane; Sulfoxylic acid
Related compounds	Hydrogen sulfide; Disulfane; Polysulfane; Polysulfides
- Except where otherwise noted, data are given for materials in their standard state (at 25 °C [77 °F], 100 kPa). verify (what is ?) Infobox references

Trisulfane is the inorganic compound with the formula H_{2}S_{3}. It is a pale yellow volatile liquid with a camphor-like odor. It decomposes readily to hydrogen sulfide (H_{2}S) and elemental sulfur. It is produced by distillation of the polysulfane oil obtained by acidification of polysulfide salts.
