= Dithionate =

Ion

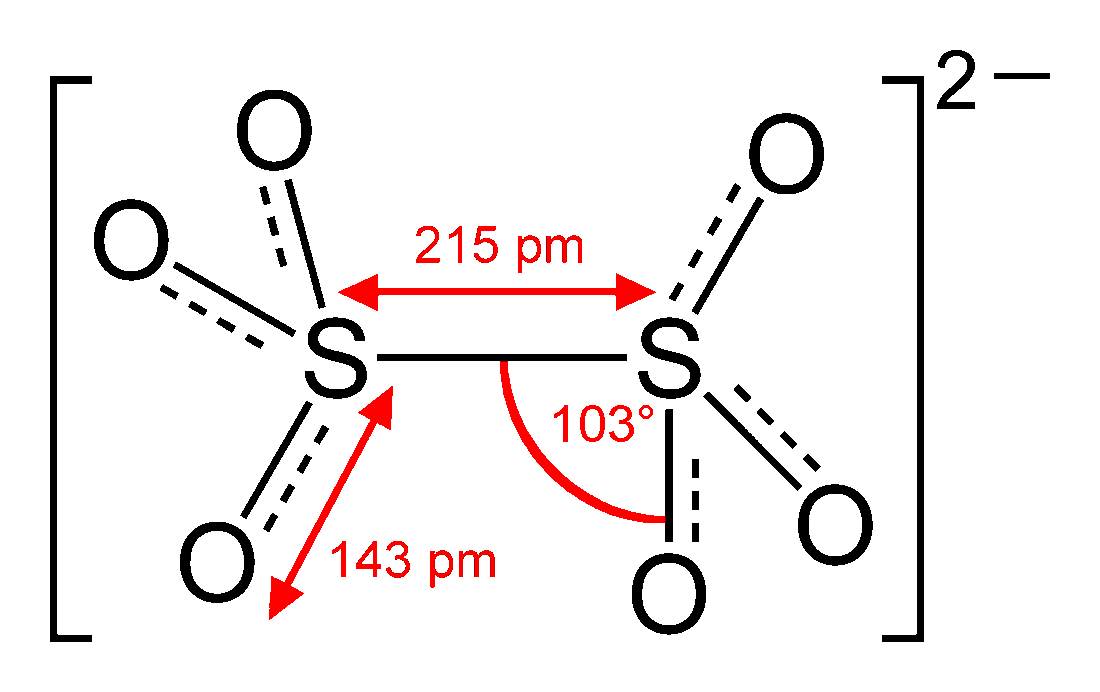
Skeletal formula of dithionate with assorted dimensions
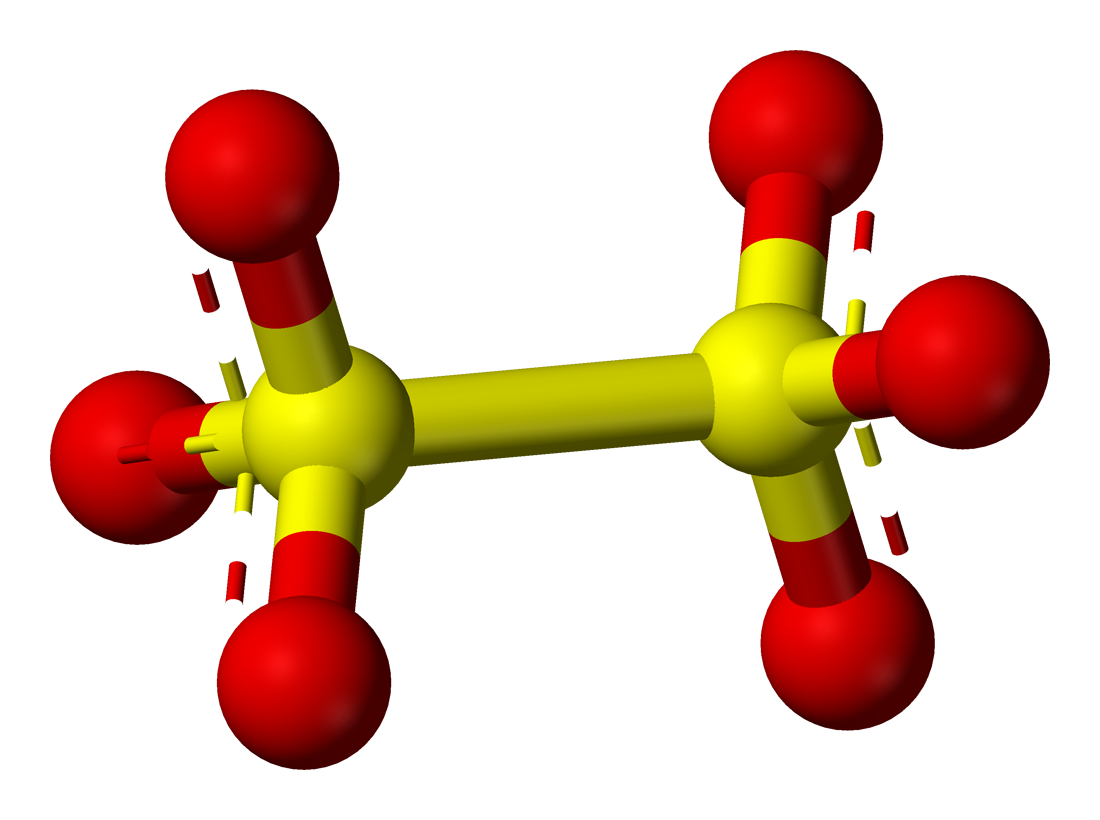
Ball and stick model of dithionate

Names
- IUPAC name Dithionate
- Systematic IUPAC name Bis(trioxidosulfate)(S—S)(2−)

Identifiers
CAS Number	14781-81-8
3D model (JSmol)	Interactive image
ChEBI	CHEBI:29209
ChemSpider	2339557
PubChem CID	3082075
CompTox Dashboard (EPA)	DTXSID60163807
- InChI: InChI=1S/H2O6S2/c1-7(2,3)8(4,5)6/h(H,1,2,3)(H,4,5,6)/p-2 Key: RMGVZKRVHHSUIM-UHFFFAOYSA-L
- SMILES: [O-][S+2]([O-])([O-])-[S+2]([O-])([O-])[O-]

Properties
Chemical formula	S_{2}O^{2−}_{6}
Molar mass	160.126 g mol^{−1}
Acidity (pK_{a})	0.5
Conjugate acid	Dithionic acid
- Except where otherwise noted, data are given for materials in their standard state (at 25 °C [77 °F], 100 kPa). Infobox references

The dithionate (or metabisulfate) anion, S_{2}O^{2−}_{6}, is a sulfur oxoanion derived from dithionic acid, H_{2}S_{2}O_{6}. Its chemical formula is sometimes written in a semistructural format, as [O_{3}SSO_{3}]^{2−}. It is the first member of the polythionates.

The sulfur atoms of the dithionate ion are in the +5 oxidation state due to the presence of the S–S bond. Generally, dithionates form stable compounds that are not readily oxidised or reduced. Strong oxidants oxidise them to sulfates and strong reducing agents reduce them to sulfites and dithionites. Aqueous solutions of dithionates are quite stable and can be boiled without decomposition.

The γ-irradiation of crystalline dithionates produces SO^{•−}_{3} radical ions. The unpaired electron in the SO^{•−}_{3} radical can be detected with electron paramagnetic resonance and barium dithionate has been proposed as the basis for a radiation dosimeter.

The dithionate ion can act as a bidentate ligand.

The structure of the dithionate ion in the solid state is staggered in Na_{2}S_{2}O_{6}·2H_{2}O, whereas in the anhydrous potassium salt it is nearly eclipsed.

== Compounds ==
Compounds containing the dithionate ion include:

- sodium dithionate, Na_{2}S_{2}O_{6}
- potassium dithionate, K_{2}S_{2}O_{6}
- barium dithionate, BaS_{2}O_{6}
