= Sodium hyponitrite =

Sodium hyponitrite (trans isomer)
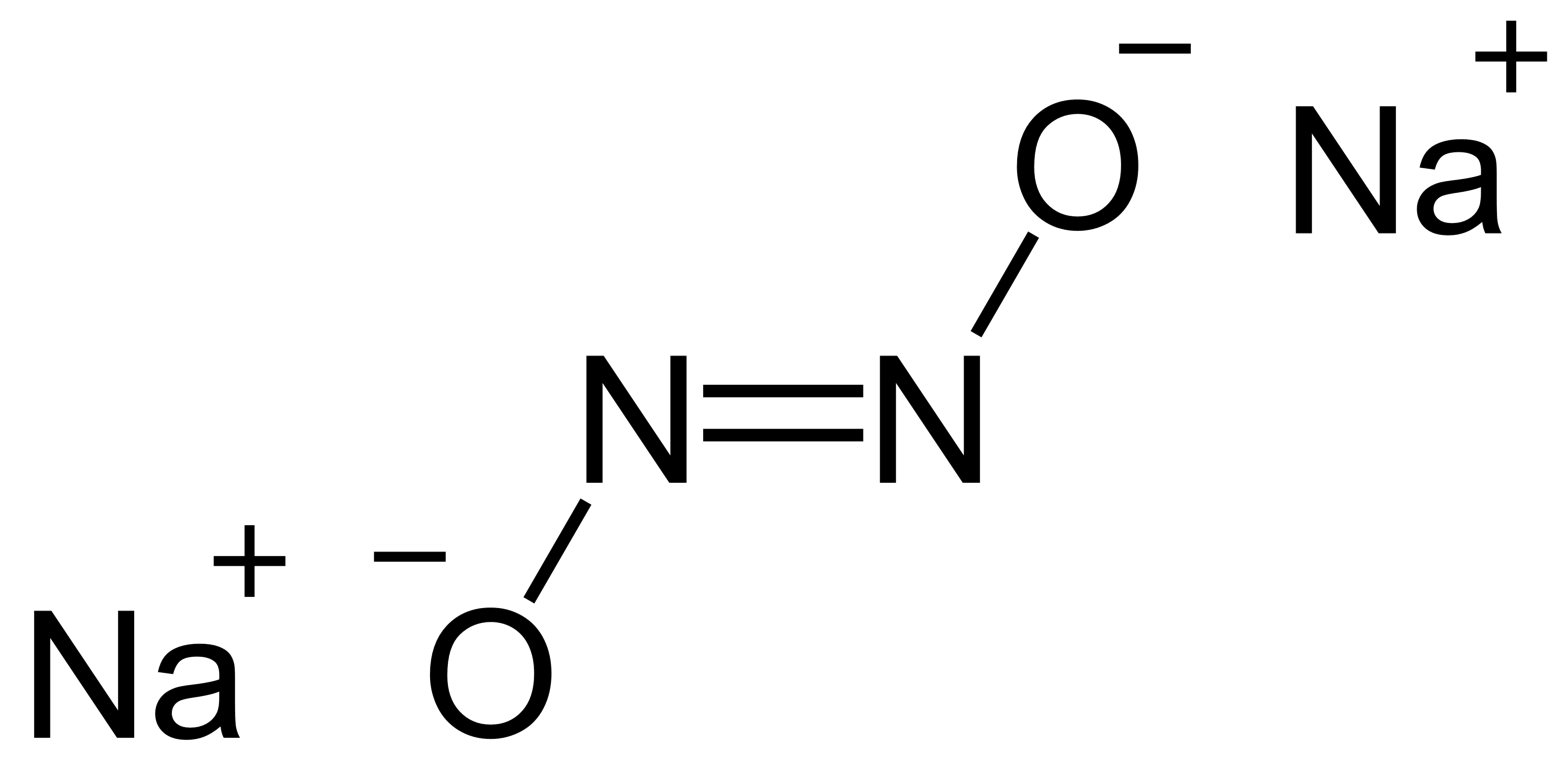

Identifiers
CAS Number	(hydrate) 60884-94-8 (hydrate)
3D model (JSmol)	Interactive image; trans-form: Interactive image; cis-form: Interactive image
ChemSpider	8210166
PubChem CID	24869787 10034601, 24869787
CompTox Dashboard (EPA)	DTXSID201031666
- InChI: InChI=1S/H2N2O2.2Na/c3-1-2-4;;/h(H,1,4)(H,2,3);;/q;2*+1/p-2 Key: HLJWMCUZPYEUDI-UHFFFAOYSA-L
- SMILES: N(=N[O-])[O-].[Na+].[Na+]; trans-form: [Na+].[O-]/N=N/[O-].[Na+]; cis-form: [Na+].[O-]\N=N/[O-].[Na+]

Properties
Chemical formula	Na_{2}N_{2}O_{2}
Molar mass	105.99 g/mol
Appearance	colorless crystals
Density	2.466 g/cm^{3}
Melting point	100 °C (212 °F; 373 K)
Boiling point	335 °C (635 °F; 608 K) decomposes
Solubility in water	soluble
Solubility	insoluble in ethanol
- Except where otherwise noted, data are given for materials in their standard state (at 25 °C [77 °F], 100 kPa). Infobox references

Sodium hyponitrite is a solid ionic compound with formula Na_{2}N_{2}O_{2} or (Na^{+})_{2}[ON=NO]^{2−}.

There are cis and trans forms of the hyponitrite ion N_{2}O^{2−}_{2}. The trans form is more common, but the cis form can be obtained too, and it is more reactive than the trans form.

== Trans isomer ==
The trans isomer is colorless and soluble in water and insoluble in ethanol and ether.

=== Preparation ===
Sodium hyponitrite (trans) is conventionally prepared by reduction of sodium nitrite with sodium amalgam.

2 NaNO_{2} + 4 Na(Hg) + 2 H_{2}O → Na_{2}N_{2}O_{2} + 4 NaOH + 4 Hg

Sodium hyponitrite (trans) was prepared in 1927 by A. W. Scott by reacting alkyl nitrites, hydroxylammonium chloride, and sodium ethoxide

RONO + NH_{2}OH + 2 EtONa → Na_{2}N_{2}O_{2} + ROH + 2 EtOH

An earlier method, published by D. Mendenhall in 1974, reacted gaseous nitric oxide (NO) with sodium metal in 1,2-dimethoxyethane, toluene, and benzophenone. The salt was then extracted with water. The method was later modified to use pyridine.

Other methods included oxidation of a concentrated solution of hydroxylamine with sodium nitrite in an alkaline medium:

NH_{2}OH (conc.) + NaNO_{2} + NaOH → Na_{2}N_{2}O_{2} + 2H_{2}O;

or electrolysis of sodium nitrite.

=== Hydrates ===
A variety of hydrates Na_{2}N_{2}O_{2}(H_{2}O)_{x} of the trans isomer have been reported, with x including 2, 3.5, 4, 5, 6, 7, 8, and 9; but there is some dispute.

The hydration water seems to be just trapped in the crystal lattice rather than coordinated to the ions. The anhydrous substance can be obtained by drying the hydrates over phosphorus pentoxide and then heating them to 120 °C.

=== Reactions ===
Sodium hyponitrite (trans) in solution is decomposed by carbon dioxide CO_{2} from air to form sodium carbonate.

Liquid N_{2}O_{4} oxidises sodium hyponitrite (trans) to give sodium peroxohyponitrite Na^{2+}_{2}[ON=NOO]^{2−}).

== Cis isomer ==
The cis isomer of sodium hyponitrite is a white crystalline solid, insoluble in aprotic solvents, and (unlike the trans isomer) decomposed by water and other protic solvents.

=== Preparation ===
The cis isomer of sodium hyponitrite can be prepared by passing nitric oxide (NO) through a solution of sodium metal in liquid ammonia at −50 °C.

The cis isomer was also obtained in 1996 by C. Feldmann and M. Jansen by heating sodium oxide Na_{2}O with 77 kPa of nitrous oxide N_{2}O (laughing gas) in a sealed tube at 360 °C for 2 hours. The two reagents combined to yield the cis hyponitrite quantitatively as white microcrystals. It was also obtained in 2021 by Carl Hoff and co-workers by ball milling (mechano-chemistry) sodium oxide sodium oxide Na_{2}O with 30 psi of nitrous oxide N_{2}O for 4 hours at room temperature.

=== Properties and reactions ===
The anhydrous cis salt is stable up to 325 °C, when it disproportionates to nitrogen and sodium orthonitrite:

3 Na_{2}N_{2}O_{2} → 2 (NaO)_{3}N + 2 N_{2}

It is generally more reactive than the trans isomer.

== See also ==
- Hyponitrous acid
