= Disulfurous acid =

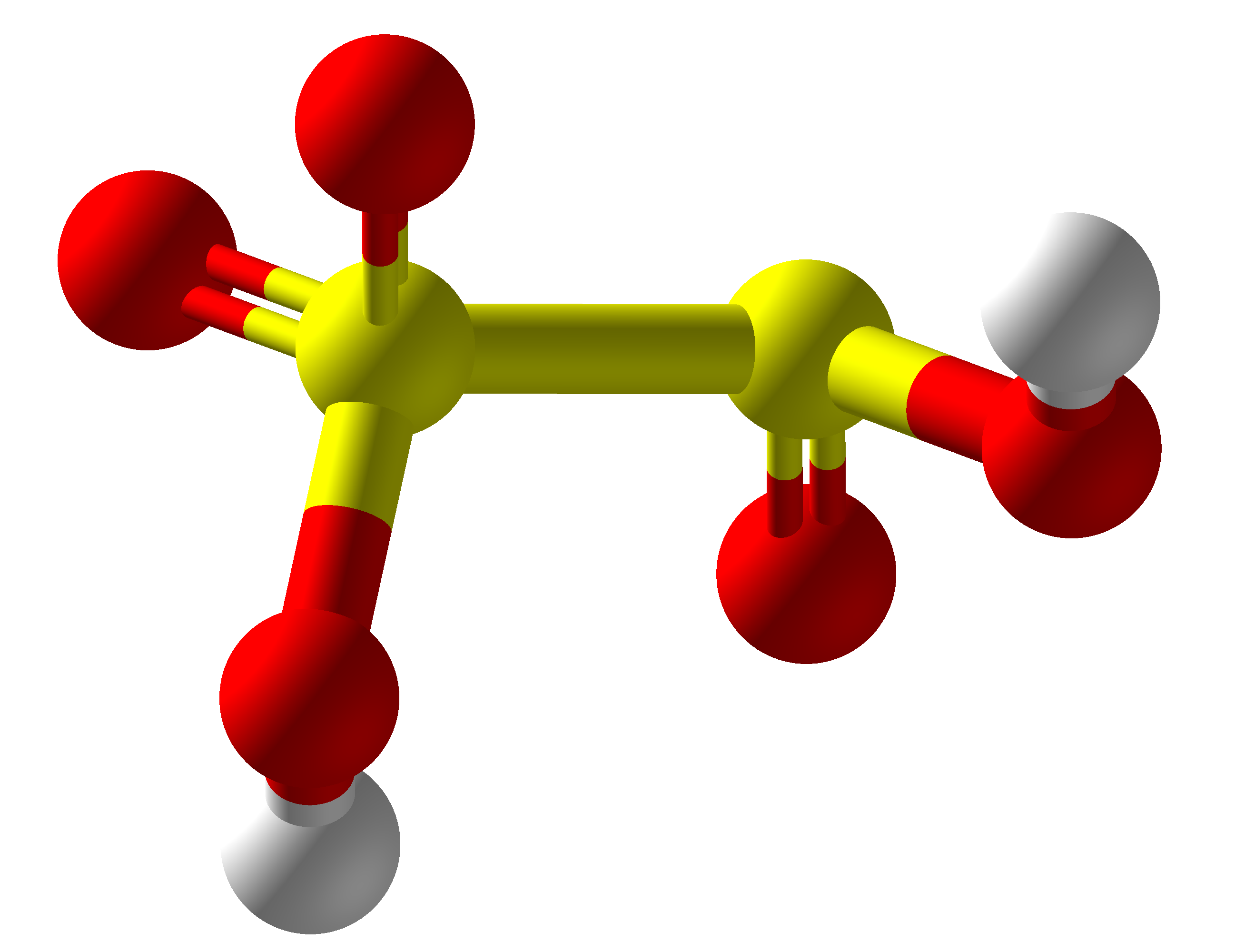

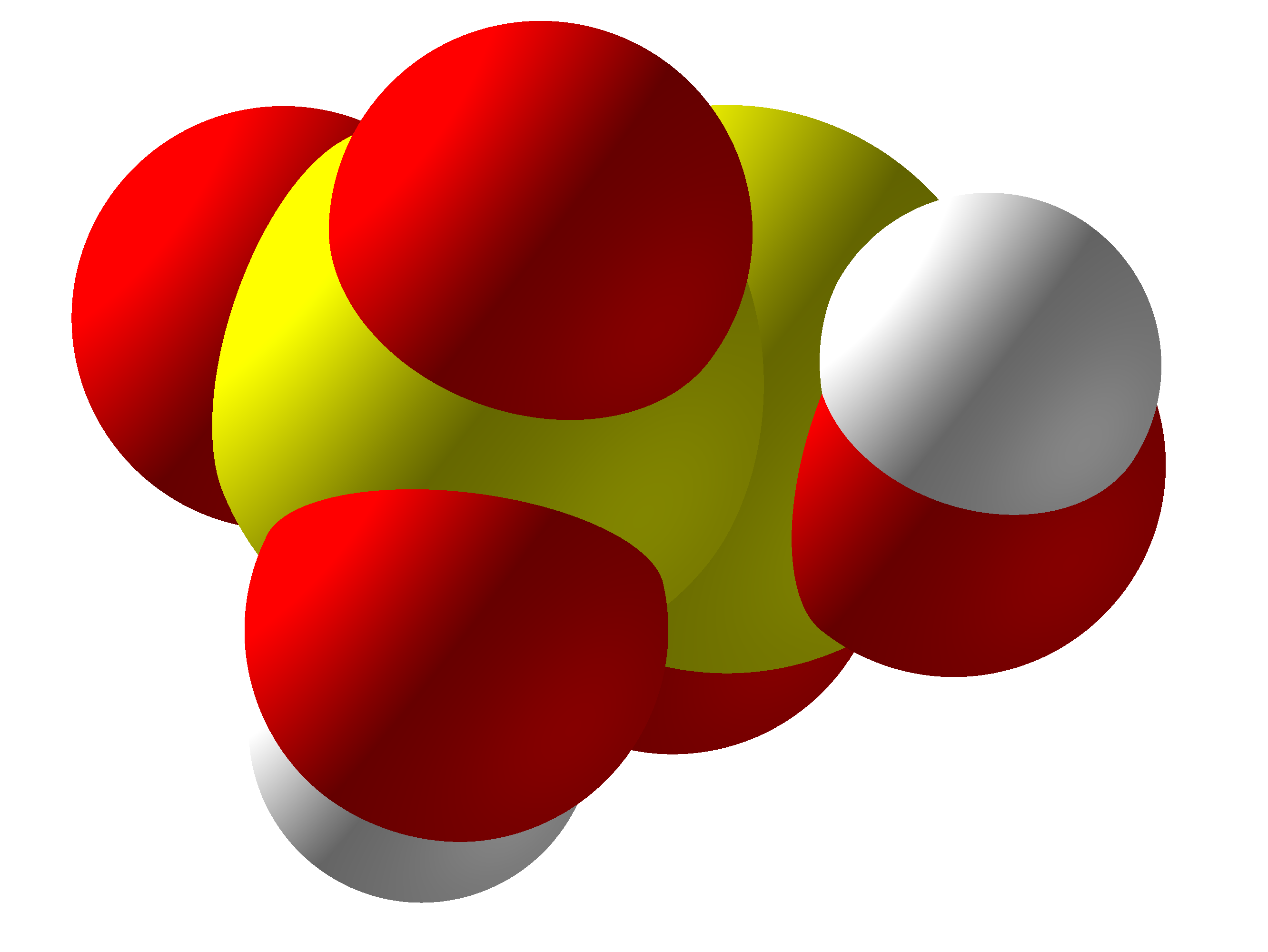

Names
- IUPAC name disulfurous acid
- Other names pyrosulfurous acid

Identifiers
CAS Number	33669-61-3
3D model (JSmol)	Interactive image
ChEBI	CHEBI:29252
ChemSpider	26062
PubChem CID	28020
UNII	CG8XAU5U77
CompTox Dashboard (EPA)	DTXSID40274768
- InChI: InChI=1S/H2O5S2/c1-6(2)7(3,4)5/h(H,1,2)(H,3,4,5) Key: WBZKQQHYRPRKNJ-UHFFFAOYSA-N; InChI=1S/H2O5S2/c1-6(2)7(3,4)5/h(H,1,2)(H,3,4,5)
- SMILES: O=S(=O)(O)S(=O)O

Properties
Chemical formula	H_{2}S_{2}O_{5}
Molar mass	146.13 g·mol^{−1}
Conjugate base	Disulfite
- Except where otherwise noted, data are given for materials in their standard state (at 25 °C [77 °F], 100 kPa). verify (what is ?) Infobox references

Disulfurous acid, metabisulfurous acid or pyrosulfurous acid is an oxoacid of sulfur with the formula H_{2}S_{2}O_{5}. Its structure is HO−S(=O)_{2}−S(=O)−OH. The salts of disulfurous acid are called disulfites or metabisulfites. Disulfurous acid is, like sulfurous acid (H_{2}SO_{3}), a phantom acid, which does not exist in the free state. In contrast to disulfate (S_{2}O_{7}^{2−}), disulfite has two directly connected sulfur atoms. The oxidation state of the sulfur atom bonded to three oxygen atoms is +5 and its valence is 6, while that of the other sulfur is +3 and 4 respectively.

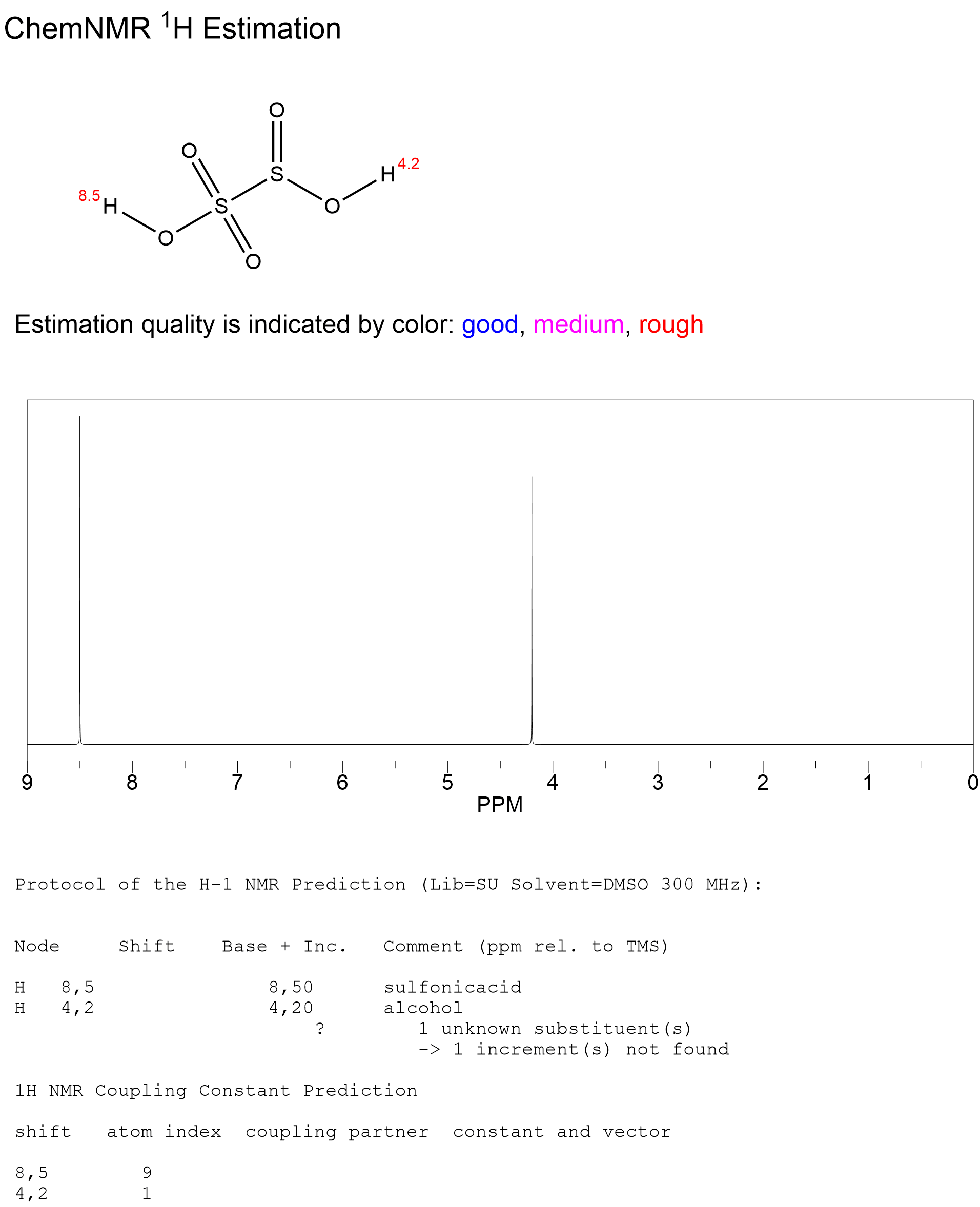
Disulfurous acid ^{1}H NMR spectrum.
