= Dihydroxydisulfane =

Names
- Other names Hydrogen disulfanediolate; Dihydroxidodisulfur; Disulfanediol

Identifiers
3D model (JSmol)	Interactive image
ChEBI	CHEBI:35921
ChemSpider	7827571
Gmelin Reference	164020
PubChem CID	9548648
CompTox Dashboard (EPA)	DTXSID101337132
- InChI: InChI=1S/H2O2S2/c1-3-4-2/h1-2H Key: JARODAOQOSWMRF-UHFFFAOYSA-N
- SMILES: OSSO

Properties
Chemical formula	H_{2}O_{2}S_{2}
Molar mass	98.13 g·mol^{−1}
Conjugate base	Disulfanediolate
- Except where otherwise noted, data are given for materials in their standard state (at 25 °C [77 °F], 100 kPa). Infobox references

Dihydroxydisulfane or hypodithionous acid is a reduced sulfur oxyacid with sulfur in a formal oxidation state of +1, but the valence of sulfur is 2. The structural formula is HO−S−S−OH, with all atoms arranged in a chain. It is an isomer of thiosulfurous acid but is lower in energy. Other isomers include HOS(=O)SH, HOS(=S)OH, and HS(=O)_{2}SH. Disulfur monoxide, S_{2}O, can be considered as the anhydride. Unlike many of these other reduced sulfur acids, dihydroxydisulfane can be formed in a pure state by reacting hydrogen sulfide with sulfur dioxide at −70 °C in dichlorodifluoromethane.

H_{2}S + SO_{2} → H_{2}S_{2}O_{2}

Dihyroxydisulfane may exist in an equilibrium with thiosulfurous acid.

Organic derivatives such as dimethoxydisulfane, diaceto disulfide, and bis(trifluoroaceto) disulfide also exist.

The conjugate bases are called disulfanediolate HS_{2}O^{−}_{2} and hypodithionite S_{2}O^{2−}_{2}.

== Properties ==
Calculations predict that the S−S bond length is 2.013 Å, O−S bond length is 1.645 Å, H−O bond length is 0.943 Å.

== Related compounds ==
Related compounds include the isoelectronic substances hydrogen tetroxide HOOOOH, hydroxotrisulfane HOSSSH, HSOSSH, and tetrasulfane HSSSSH.
