= Peroxynitric acid =

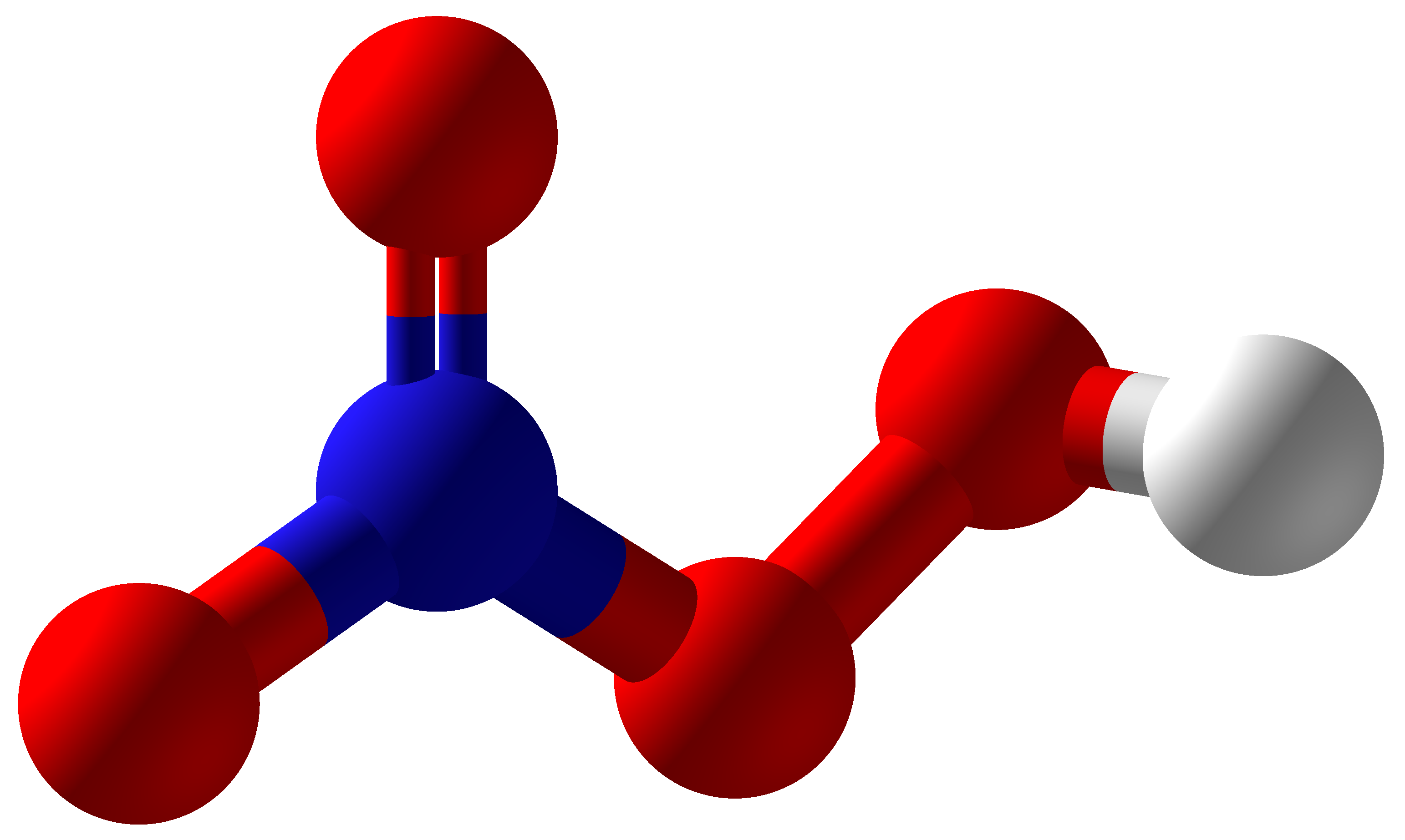

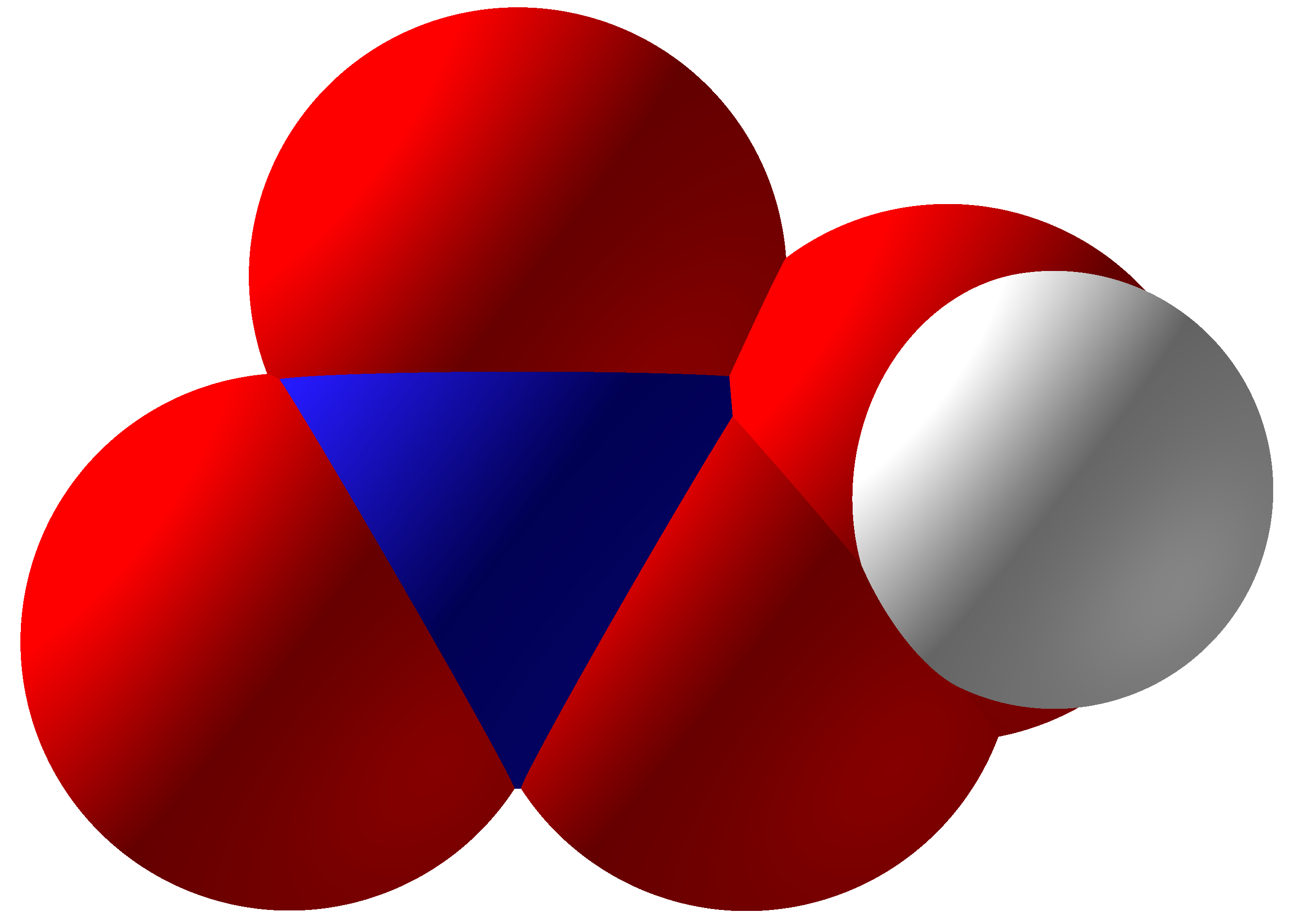

Names
- Preferred IUPAC name Hydroxy nitrate
- Systematic IUPAC name Hydroxy nitrate

Identifiers
| CAS Number | 26404-66-0 |
| 3D model (JSmol) | Interactive image |
| ChemSpider | 58833 |
| PubChem CID | 65357 |
| CompTox Dashboard (EPA) | DTXSID201030501 |
- InChI: Key: UUZZMWZGAZGXSF-UHFFFAOYSA-N
- SMILES: [N+](=O)([O-])OO

Properties
| Chemical formula | HNO_{4} |
| Molar mass | 79.011 g·mol^{−1} |
| Conjugate base | Peroxynitrate |

Related compounds
| Related compounds | Peroxynitrous acid; Peroxynitrate |
- Except where otherwise noted, data are given for materials in their standard state (at 25 °C [77 °F], 100 kPa). Infobox references

Peroxynitric acid or peroxonitric acid is a chemical compound with the formula HNO_{4}. It is an oxyacid of nitrogen, after peroxynitrous acid.

== Preparation ==
Peroxynitrate, the conjugate base of peroxynitric acid, is formed rapidly during decomposition of peroxynitrite in neutral conditions.

== Atmospheric chemistry ==
Peroxynitric acid is formed in the atmosphere, although it is unstable, it is important as a reservoir for NO_{2} through the reversible radical reaction:

HO_{2}NO_{2} ⇌ HO_{2}^{•} + NO_{2}^{•}

== Stability ==
The pure compound decomposes explosively at −30 °C (−22 °F). Solutions in water or acetic acid of over 70% concentration decompose autocatalytically with resulting explosions.
