= Dithionic acid =

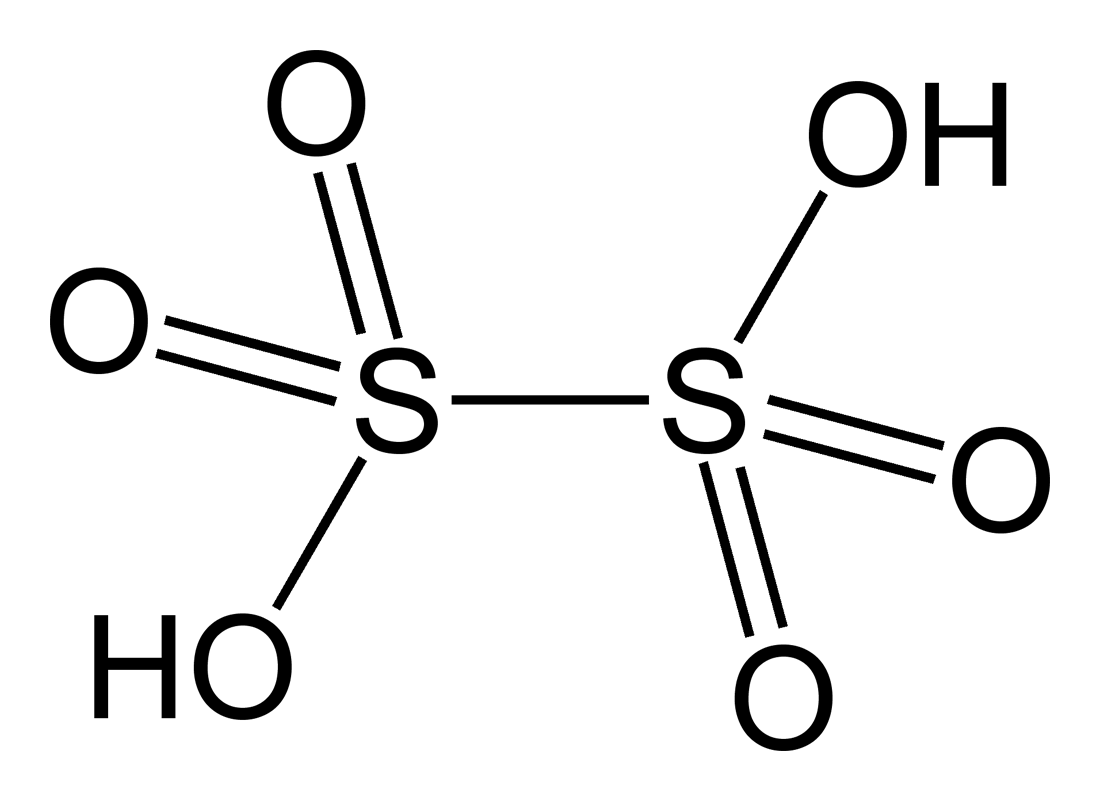

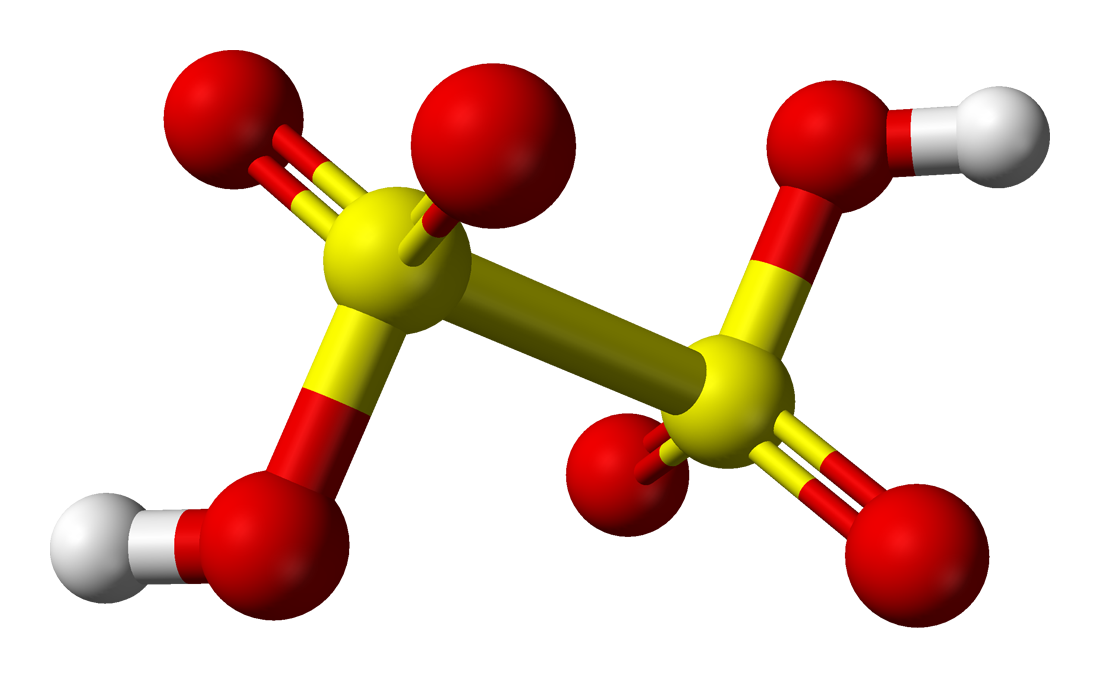

Names
- IUPAC name dithionic acid
- Other names hypodisulfuric acid

Identifiers
| CAS Number | 14970-71-9 |
| 3D model (JSmol) | Interactive image |
| ChEBI | CHEBI:29208 |
| ChemSpider | 25128 |
| PubChem CID | 26985 |
| UNII | 9MP5KH5623 |
| CompTox Dashboard (EPA) | DTXSID50164368 |
- InChI: InChI=1S/H2O6S2/c1-7(2,3)8(4,5)6/h(H,1,2,3)(H,4,5,6) Key: RMGVZKRVHHSUIM-UHFFFAOYSA-N; InChI=1/H2O6S2/c1-7(2,3)8(4,5)6/h(H,1,2,3)(H,4,5,6) Key: RMGVZKRVHHSUIM-UHFFFAOYAM
- SMILES: O=S(=O)(O)S(=O)(=O)O

Properties
| Chemical formula | H_{2}S_{2}O_{6} |
| Molar mass | 162.13 g·mol^{−1} |
| Acidity (pK_{a}) | −3.4 (estimated) |
| Conjugate base | Dithionate |
- Except where otherwise noted, data are given for materials in their standard state (at 25 °C [77 °F], 100 kPa). verify (what is ?) Infobox references

Dithionic acid, H_{2}S_{2}O_{6}, is the inorganic compound with the formula H_{2}S_{2}O_{6}. It is the doubly protonated derivative of dithionate, a well-characterized dianion. Dithionic acid is mainly observed and characterized as an aqueous solution.

== Synthesis ==
Dithionates can be made by oxidizing a sulfite (from the +4 to the +5 oxidation state), but on a larger scale they are made by oxidizing a cooled aqueous solution of sulfur dioxide with manganese dioxide:

2 MnO_{2} + 3 SO_{2} → MnS_{2}O_{6} + MnSO_{4}

The manganese dithionate solution formed can then be converted to dithionate salts of other metals by metathesis reactions:

Ba^{2+} (aq) + MnS_{2}O_{6} (aq) + MnSO_{4} (aq) → BaSO_{4} (s)↓ + BaS_{2}O_{6} · 2 H_{2}O (aq)

Concentrated solutions of dithionic acid can subsequently be obtained treating a barium dithionate solution with sulfuric acid:

BaS_{2}O_{6} (aq) + H_{2}SO_{4} (aq) → H_{2}S_{2}O_{6} (aq) + BaSO_{4} (s)↓

== See also ==
- Sodium dithionate
- Hypophosphoric acid, the phosphorus equivalent.
