= Sodium dithionate =

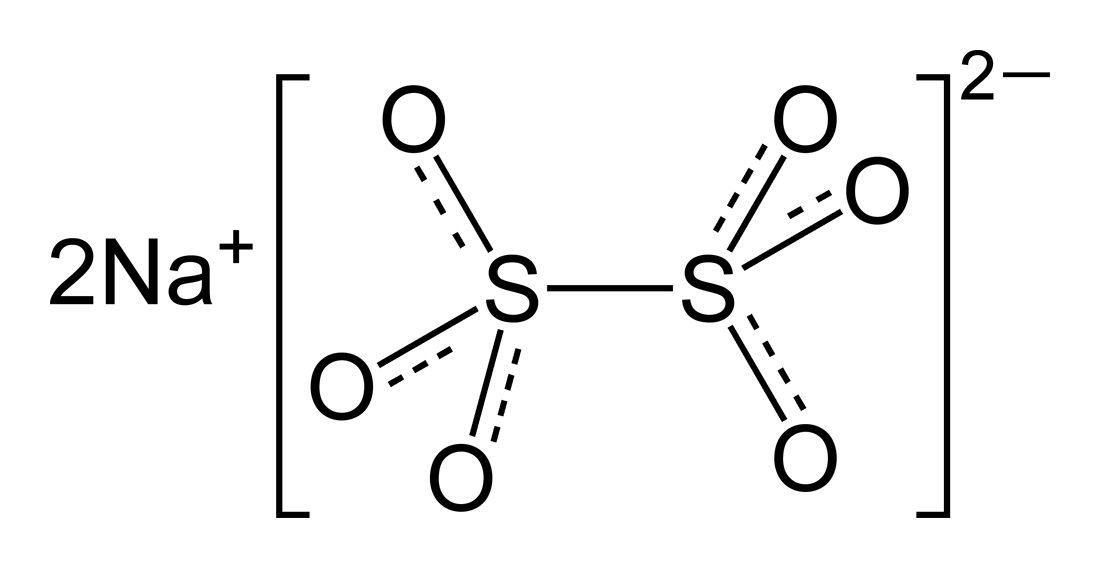
- Two sodium cations and one dithionate anion

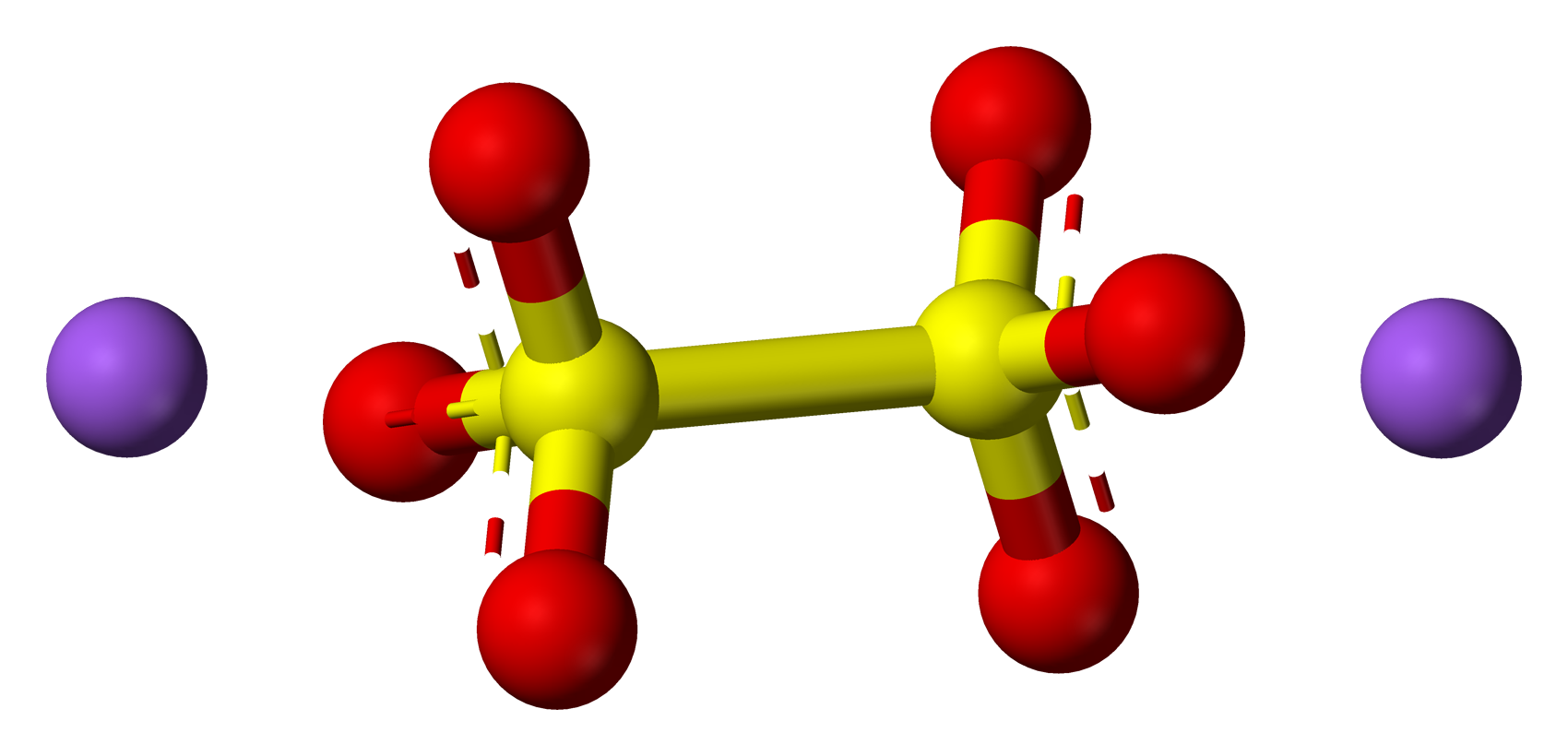
- Ball-and-stick model of the component ions

Names
- IUPAC name Sodium dithionate
- Other names Sodium hyposulfate, Sodium metabisulfate

Identifiers
| CAS Number | 7631-94-9 |
| 3D model (JSmol) | Interactive image |
| ChemSpider | 128833 |
| ECHA InfoCard | 100.028.682 |
| EC Number | 231-550-1 |
| PubChem CID | 146045 |
| UNII | RPF7Z41GAW |
| CompTox Dashboard (EPA) | DTXSID70227181 |
- InChI: InChI=1S/2Na.H2O6S2/c;;1-7(2,3)8(4,5)6/h;;(H,1,2,3)(H,4,5,6)/q2*+1;/p-2 Key: CSMWJXBSXGUPGY-UHFFFAOYSA-L; InChI=1/2Na.H2O6S2/c;;1-7(2,3)8(4,5)6/h;;(H,1,2,3)(H,4,5,6)/q2*+1;/p-2 Key: CSMWJXBSXGUPGY-NUQVWONBAI
- SMILES: [Na+].[Na+].[O-]S(=O)(=O)S([O-])(=O)=O

Properties
| Chemical formula | Na_{2}S_{2}O_{6} |
| Molar mass | 206.106 g/mol |
| Appearance | White crystalline powder |
| Density | 2.19 g/cm^{3} |
| Melting point | 190 °C (374 °F; 463 K) (decomposes); 52 °C (dihydrate) |
| Boiling point | 267 °C (513 °F; 540 K) decomposes |
| Solubility in water | 6.27 g/100 mL (0 °C); 15.12 g/100 mL (20 °C); 64.74 g/100 mL (100 °C) |

Hazards
| NFPA 704 (fire diamond) | 3 0 0 |
- Except where otherwise noted, data are given for materials in their standard state (at 25 °C [77 °F], 100 kPa). verify (what is ?) Infobox references

Sodium dithionate Na_{2}S_{2}O_{6} is an important compound for inorganic chemistry. It is also known under names disodium dithionate, sodium hyposulfate, and sodium metabisulfate. The sulfur can be considered to be in its +5 oxidation state.

It should not be confused with sodium dithionite, Na_{2}S_{2}O_{4}, which is a very different compound, and is a powerful reducing agent with many uses in chemistry and biochemistry. Confusion between dithionate and dithionite is commonly encountered, even in manufacturers' catalogues.

== Preparation ==
Sodium dithionate is produced by the oxidation of sodium bisulfite by manganese dioxide:

2 NaHSO_{3} + MnO_{2} → Na_{2}S_{2}O_{6} + MnO + H_{2}O

Alternatively, it can be prepared by the oxidation of sodium sulfite by the silver(I) cation:

Na_{2}SO_{3} + 2 Ag^{+} + SO^{2−}_{3} → Na_{2}S_{2}O_{6} + 2 Ag

Another method is via oxidation of sodium thiosulfate with chlorine:

3 Cl_{2} + Na_{2}S_{2}O_{3}·5H_{2}O + 6 NaOH → Na_{2}S_{2}O_{6} + 6 NaCl + 8 H_{2}O

And another method to produce sodium dithionate is treating sodium thiosulfate with sodium hypochlorite solution.

== Structure ==
The dithionate ion represents sulfur that is oxidized relative to elemental sulfur, but not totally oxidized. Sulfur can be reduced to sulfide or totally oxidized to sulfate, with numerous intermediate oxidation states in inorganic moieties, as well as organosulfur compounds. Example inorganic ions include sulfite and thiosulfate.

Sodium dithionate crystallize as orthorhombic crystals of the dihydrate (Na_{2}S_{2}O_{6}). The water of crystallization is lost when heated to 90 °C, and the structure becomes hexagonal.

Large single crystals of (Na_{2}S_{2}O_{6}·2H_{2}O) have been grown and studied for pulsed lasing purposes (pico second spectroscopy) with great success by E. Haussühl and cols.

== Properties ==
Sodium dithionate is a very stable compound which is not oxidized by permanganate, dichromate or bromine. It can be oxidized to sulfate under strongly oxidizing conditions: these include boiling for one hour with 5 M sulfuric acid with an excess of potassium dichromate, or treating with an excess of hydrogen peroxide then boiling with concentrated hydrochloric acid.

The Gibbs free energy change for (for example) the dithionate anion's oxidation to sulfate is a negative −300 kJ/mol, making it thermodynamically unstable against oxidation, but the kinetics for this reaction are rather poor. For similar reasons, the dithionate anion has been used to form single crystals of large cation complexes in high oxidation states, as the resulting salts are very likely highly kinetically stable(unless in extraordinary conditions that obviously do not belong to crystal analysis- see above), enough to survive all the way throughout the analysis of the crystal.
