= Thiosulfurous acid =

- Structure of thiosulfurous acid

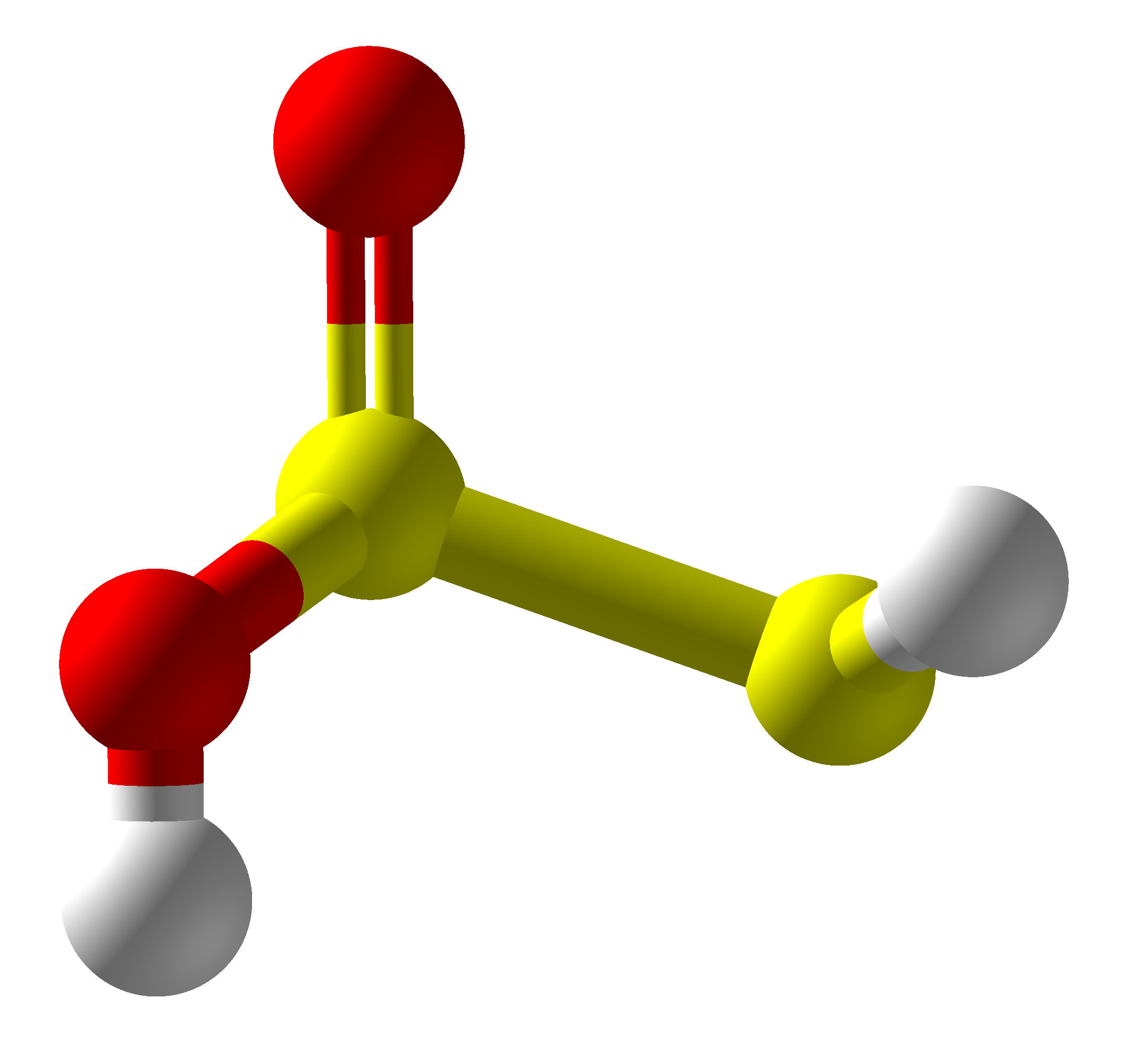

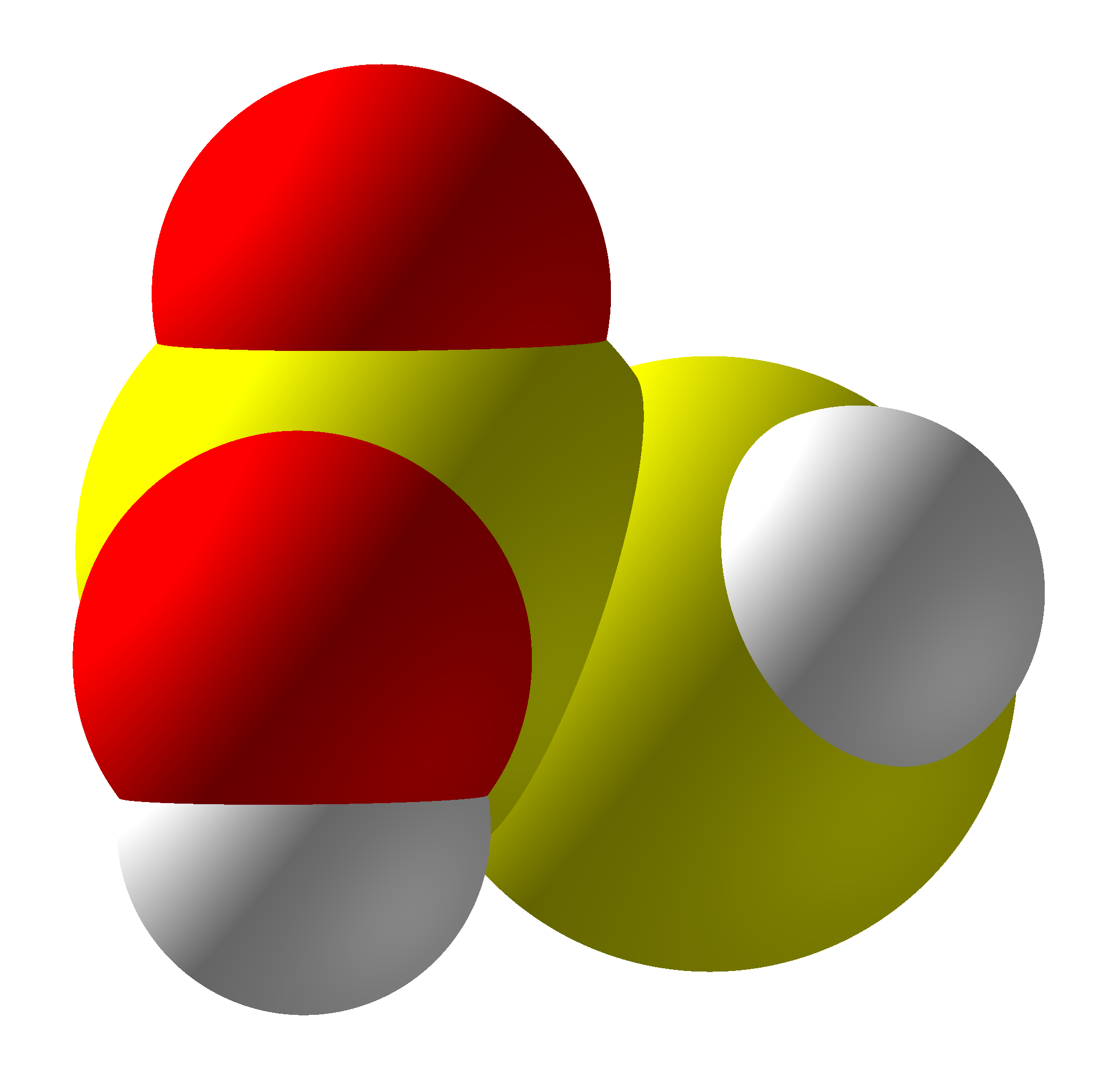

Names
- IUPAC names sulfurothious S-acid sulfurothious O,S-acid
- Systematic IUPAC name hydroxidooxidosulfanidosulfur
- Other names sulfurothionous acid Thiothionyl hydroxide (minor tautomer)

Identifiers
CAS Number	15060-43-2
3D model (JSmol)	Interactive image
ChEBI	CHEBI:35926
ChemSpider	7827575
Gmelin Reference	184467
PubChem CID	9548652
CompTox Dashboard (EPA)	DTXSID401045691
- InChI: InChI=1S/H2O2S2/c1-4(2)3/h(H2,1,2,3) Key: QAMMXRHDATVZSO-UHFFFAOYSA-N
- SMILES: OS(S)=O

Properties
Chemical formula	H_{2}S_{2}O_{2}
Molar mass	98.14668
Conjugate base	Thiosulfite

Related compounds
Related compounds	thiosulfuric acid SSO thiosulfinic acid
- Except where otherwise noted, data are given for materials in their standard state (at 25 °C [77 °F], 100 kPa). Infobox references

Thiosulfurous acid is a hypothetical chemical compound with the formula HS−S(=O)−OH or HO−S(=S)−OH. Attempted synthesis leads to polymers. It is a low oxidation state (+1) sulfur acid. It is the Arrhenius acid for disulfur monoxide. Salts derived from thiosulfurous acid, which are also unknown, are named "thiosulfites", "thionosulfites" or "sulfurothioites". The ion is S=SO^{2−}_{2}.

== Structures ==
Other possible constitutional isomers are dihydroxydisulfane or hypodithionous acid HOSSOH, a linear chain, and thiothionyl hydroxide (S=S(OH)_{2}) a tautomer where the hydrogen has moved from a sulfur to an oxygen. The isomer with one hydrogen on sulfur and one on oxygen is the most stable according to calculations. For HOSSOH, two different rotamers are possible, one with symmetry C_{1} and the other C_{2}.

== Dithiosulfurous acid ==
The sulfur analog of thiosulfuric acid (HS−S(=O)_{2}−OH), in which two sulfur atoms branch off of the central sulfur atom of a linear dihydrogen trisulfide structure (tetrathiosulfuric acid, (S=)_{2}S(−SH)_{2} or (^{−}S−)_{2}S^{2+}(−SH)_{2}) has also been computationally studied.

== Reactions ==
It apparently decomposes to polysulfane oxide or polythionic acids in water, which is termed Wakenroder's liquid.

In alkaline conditions thiosulfurous acid rapidly deteriorates forming a mixture of sulfide, sulfur, sulfite, and thiosulfate. In acidic conditions it will form hydrogen sulfide and sulfur dioxide as well. Some of these react to form pentathionate and other polythionates. Thiosulfurous acid reacts with sulfurous acid to give tetrathionate, and with thiosulfuric acid to make hexathionate.

== Esters ==
There are four possible R_{2}S_{2}O_{2} isomers (restricting sulfur to di- and tetravalence):

(RO)_{2}S=S
A simple example is diethylthiosulfite, (EtO)_{2}S=S, also known as diethylthionosulfite. It is stereochemically rigid on the NMR timescale to about 140 °C, somewhat similar to diethylsulfoxide.
Many cyclic derivatives have been prepared from glycols. meso-Hydrobenzoin (PhCH(OH)−CH(OH)Ph) gives two stereoisomers; a third isomer results from d,l-PhCH(OH)−CH(OH)Ph.
ROSSOR
Simple alkoxides react with disulfur dichloride to give the unbranched ROSSOR. They are immiscible in water, but dissolve in benzene or carbon tetrachloride. These species are less rigid than thiosulfite-type esters.
RS(O)_{2}SR
These compounds are the thiosulfonates.
RS(O)SOR
Disulfoxides are unstable, rearranging to the thiosulfonate.
