= Nitroxylic acid =

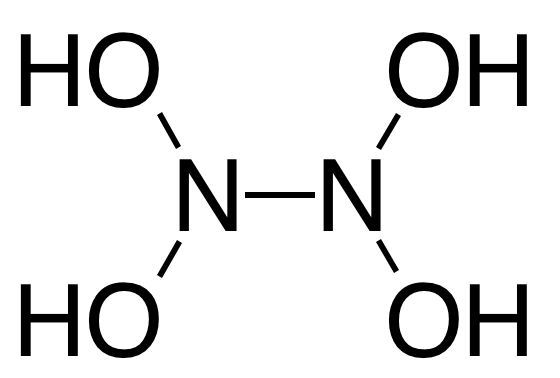

Names
- IUPAC name Hydrazine-1,1,2,2-tetrol

Identifiers
CAS Number	114045-05-5
3D model (JSmol)	Interactive image
ChemSpider	35804559
PubChem CID	71338005
CompTox Dashboard (EPA)	DTXSID40765641
- InChI: InChI=1S/H4N2O4/c3-1(4)2(5)6/h3-6H Key: HAEJYKGCOSKNFL-UHFFFAOYSA-N
- SMILES: N(N(O)O)(O)O

Properties
Chemical formula	H_{4}N_{2}O_{4}
Molar mass	96.042 g·mol^{−1}
- Except where otherwise noted, data are given for materials in their standard state (at 25 °C [77 °F], 100 kPa). Infobox references

Nitroxylic acid or hydronitrous acid is an unstable reduced oxonitrogen acid. It has formula H_{4}N_{2}O_{4} containing nitrogen in the +2 oxidation state. It consists of a central pair of bonded nitrogen atoms with four hydroxyl groups around them, giving rise to hydrazine-1,1,2,2-tetrol as an alternate chemical name.

The corresponding anion called nitroxylate is N_{2}O^{4−}_{4}; its empirical formula NO^{2−}_{2} is the basis for the original names of some of its salts.

The first clue that nitroxylic acid exists was when Edward Bedford Maxted electrolysed sodium nitrite dissolved in liquid ammonia. A bright yellow substance deposited on the cathode. He called this disodium nitrite. The disodium nitrite could also be made by mixing ammonia solutions of sodium and sodium nitrite in the complete absence of water. Disodium nitrite reacts with water to form sodium nitrite, sodium hydroxide and hydrogen. Other ways to make the disodium nitrite include reacting sodium with ammonium nitrate or electrolysing sodium nitrate solution. The substance is called sodium nitroxylate by current systematic nomenclature rules.

Disodium nitrite is very unstable and experimenters often had their apparatus destroyed when making it. Disodium nitrite reacts with oxygen and carbon dioxide explosively. Lithium sodium nitroxylate LiNaNO_{2} also exists and explodes at 130 °C.

The parent compound, nitroxylic acid, might be produced when nitrous acid is reduced by the Eu^{2+} ion.
