= Hyponitrous acid =

- Tautomer wireframe models of hyponitrous acid

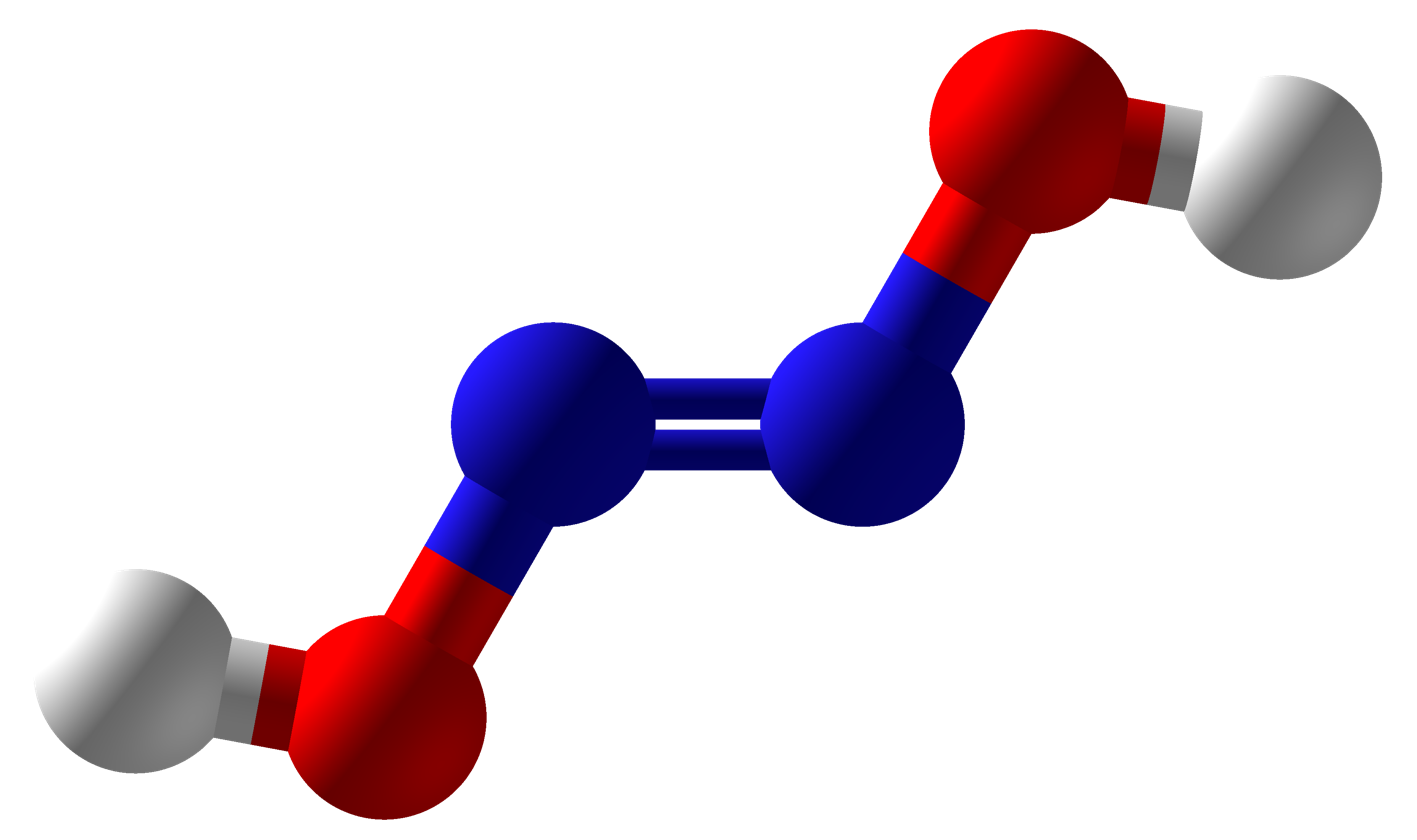

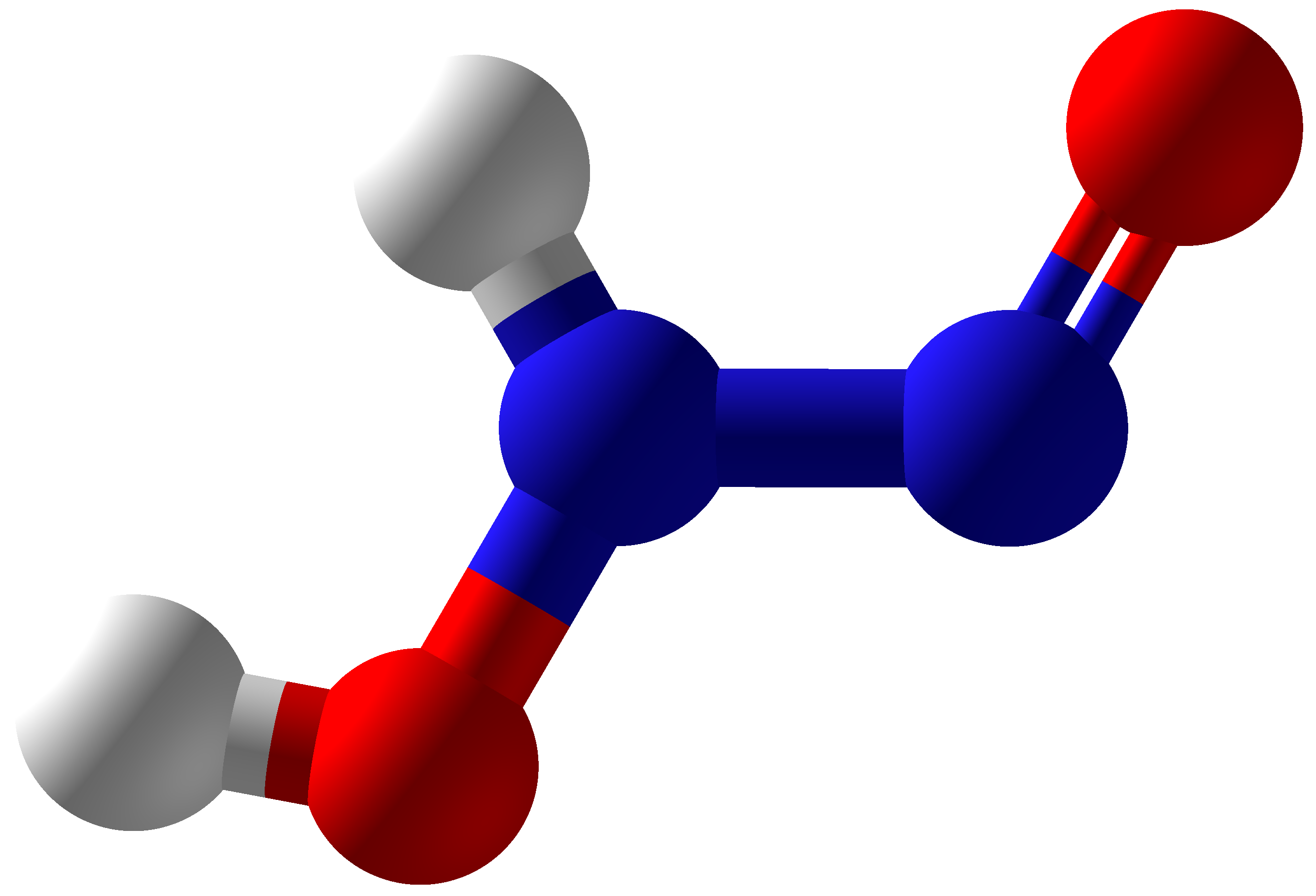

Names
- Preferred IUPAC name Diazenediol
- Systematic IUPAC name N-(Hydroxyimino)hydroxylamine
- Other names Hyponitrous acid dimer

Identifiers
| CAS Number | 14448-38-5 |
| 3D model (JSmol) | Interactive image |
| ChEBI | CHEBI:14428 |
| ChemSpider | 55636 |
| Gmelin Reference | 141300 |
| KEGG | C01818 |
| PubChem CID | 61744 |
| CompTox Dashboard (EPA) | DTXSID40896989 |
- InChI: InChI=1S/H2N2O/c3-1-2-4/h(H,1,4)(H,2,3) Key: NFMHSPWHNQRFNR-UHFFFAOYSA-N
- SMILES: ON=NO

Properties
| Chemical formula | H_{2}N_{2}O_{2} |
| Molar mass | 62.0282 g/mol |
| Appearance | white crystals |
| Conjugate base | Hyponitrite |

Hazards
- Occupational safety and health (OHS/OSH)
| Main hazards | explosive when dry |
- Except where otherwise noted, data are given for materials in their standard state (at 25 °C [77 °F], 100 kPa). Infobox references

Hyponitrous acid is a chemical compound with formula H_{2}N_{2}O_{2} or HON=NOH. It is an isomer of nitramide, H_{2}N−NO_{2}, and a formal dimer of azanone, HNO.

Hyponitrous acid forms two series of salts, the hyponitrites containing the [ON=NO]^{2−} anion and the "acid hyponitrites" containing the [HON=NO]^{−} anion.

== Structure and properties ==
There are two possible structures of hyponitrous acid, trans and cis. trans-Hyponitrous acid forms white crystals that are explosive when dry. In aqueous solution, it is a weak acid (pK_{a1} = 7.21, pK_{a2} = 11.54), and decomposes to nitrous oxide and water with a half life of 16 days at 25 °C at pH 1–3:

H_{2}N_{2}O_{2} → H_{2}O + N_{2}O

Since this reaction is not reversible, N_{2}O should not be considered as the anhydride of H_{2}N_{2}O_{2}.

The cis acid is not known, but its sodium salt can be obtained.

== Preparation ==
Hyponitrous acid (trans) can be prepared from silver(I) hyponitrite and anhydrous HCl in ether:

Ag_{2}N_{2}O_{2} + 2 HCl → H_{2}N_{2}O_{2} + 2 AgCl

Spectroscopic data indicate a trans configuration for the resulting acid.

It can also be synthesized from hydroxylamine and nitrous acid:

NH_{2}OH + HNO_{2} → H_{2}N_{2}O_{2} + H_{2}O

== Biological aspects ==
In enzymology, a hyponitrite reductase is an enzyme that catalyzes the chemical reaction:

H_{2}N_{2}O_{2} + 2 NADH + 2 H^{+} ⇌ 2 NH_{2}OH + 2 NAD^{+}
