= Peroxynitrate =

Identifiers
CAS Number	125239-87-4
3D model (JSmol)	Interactive image
ChEBI	CHEBI:29270
ChemSpider	4574117
PubChem CID	5460620
CompTox Dashboard (EPA)	DTXSID301032974
- InChI: InChI=1S/HNO4/c2-1(3)5-4/h4H/p-1 Key: UUZZMWZGAZGXSF-UHFFFAOYSA-M
- SMILES: [N+](=O)([O-])O[O-]

Properties
Chemical formula	NO_{4}^{−}
Molar mass	78.004 g·mol^{−1}

Related compounds
Related compounds	peroxycarbonate; peroxysulfate
- Except where otherwise noted, data are given for materials in their standard state (at 25 °C [77 °F], 100 kPa). Infobox references

Peroxynitrate (or peroxonitrate) refers to salts of the unstable peroxynitric acid, HNO_{4}. Peroxynitrate is unstable and decomposes to nitrate and dioxygen.

No solid peroxynitrate salts are known. However, there is a report that the chemist Sebastian Moiseevich Tanatar produced sodium peroxynitrate octahydrate (NaNO_{3}·H_{2}O_{2}·8H_{2}O) by evaporating a solution of sodium nitrate and hydrogen peroxide until crystallisation begins and then mixing with alcohol to form crystals of the octahydrate.
