= Transition metal cyanate complexes =

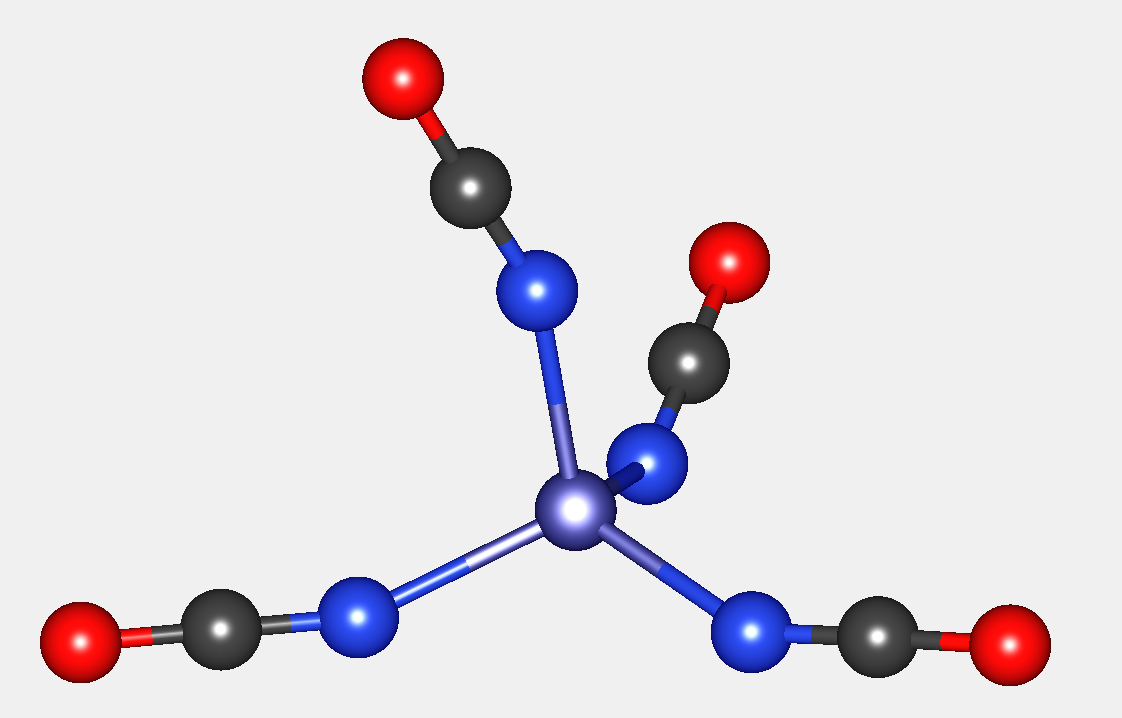
Structure of the tetrahedral complex [Mn(NCO)_{4}]^{2-}. Color code: blue = N, red = O. Selected bond distances: Mn-N = 207, N-C = 117, C-O = 121 picometer

Transition metal cyanate complexes are coordination complexes containing one or more cyanate (NCO^{−}) ligands. Many complexes are known for this venerable ligand.

== Structure and bonding ==
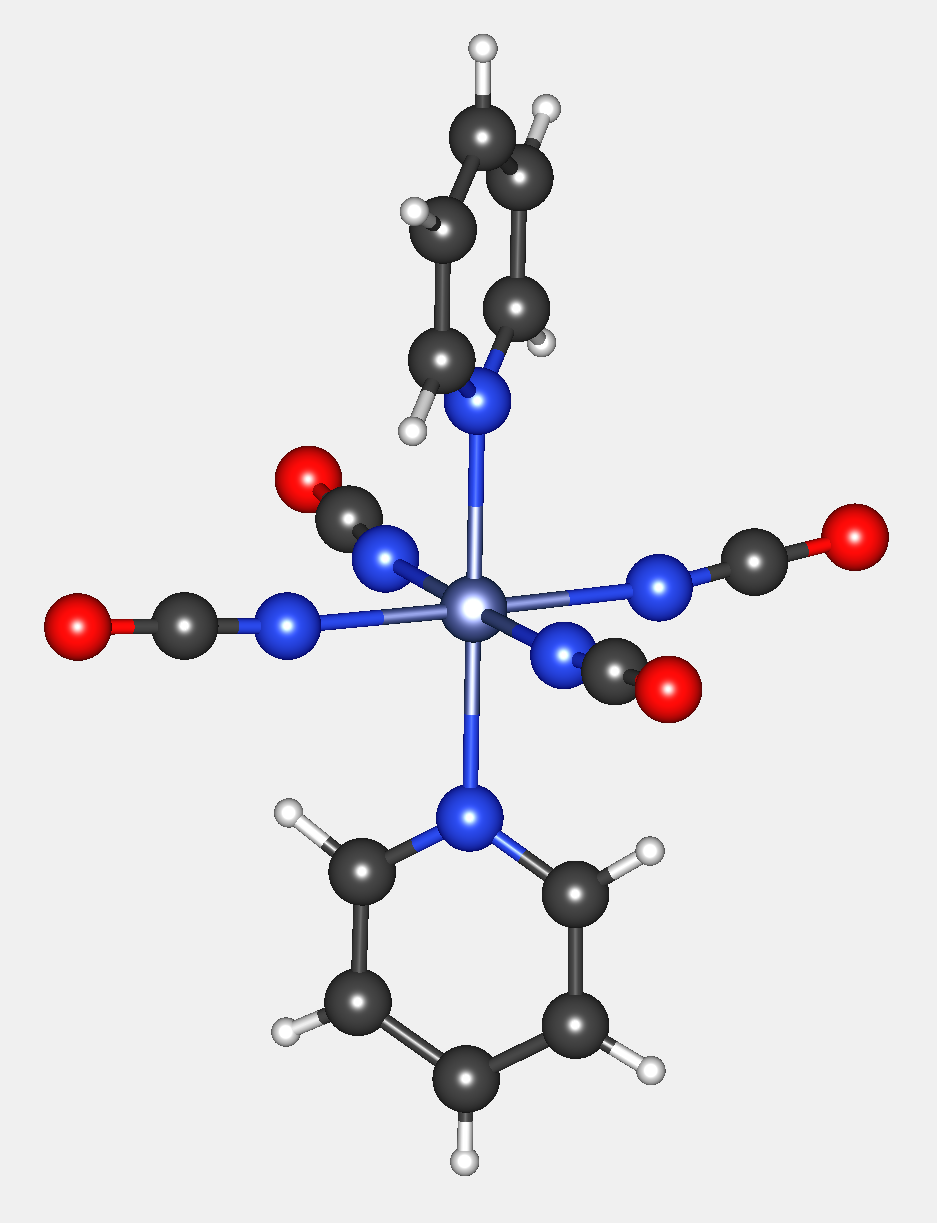
Structure of the anionic Mo(III) complex [Mo(pyridine)_{2}(NCO)_{4}]^{-}. Color code: blue = N, red = O.

Cyanate is a pseudohalide. As reflected by the pKa's of cyanic acid (3.7) and hydrochloric acid (-5.9), cyanate is more basic than chloride. As a monodentate ligand, cyanate generally binds metals through the nitrogen atom, i.e., M-N=C=O. It is a sigma donor. It is classified as an X ligand in the Covalent bond classification method. In the usual electron counting method, it is a one-electron ligand.

The NCO unit is linear or nearly so in cyanate complexes. The M-N-C angles can be quite bent or nearly linear. The bond distances determined by X-ray crystallography support the description [N=C=O]^{-}.

Examples of homoleptic complexes are the tetrahedral dianions [Mn(NCO)_{4}]^{2-}, [Co(NCO)_{4}]^{2-}, and [Zn(NCO)_{4}]^{2-}.

== Preparation ==
Metal cyanate complexes can be prepared using alkali metal cyanate salts such as sodium cyanate and potassium cyanate.

The complex [Co(NH_{3})_{5}(NCO)]^{2+} is prepared from treating the aquo complex [Co(NH_{3})_{5}(H_{2}O)]^{3+} with urea.
