= Mercury(II) fulminate =

- $\ce{{}^{-}O-\overset{+}{N}#C-Hg-C#\overset{+}{N}-O^{-}}$
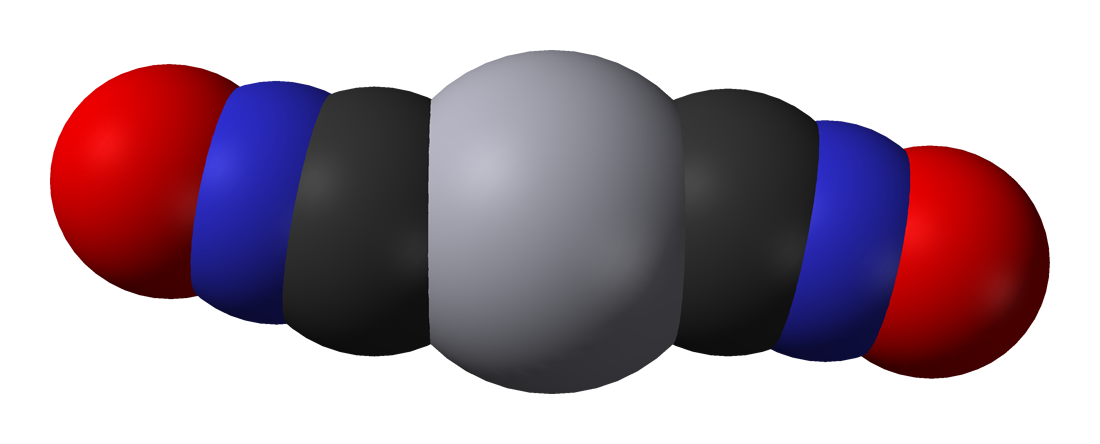

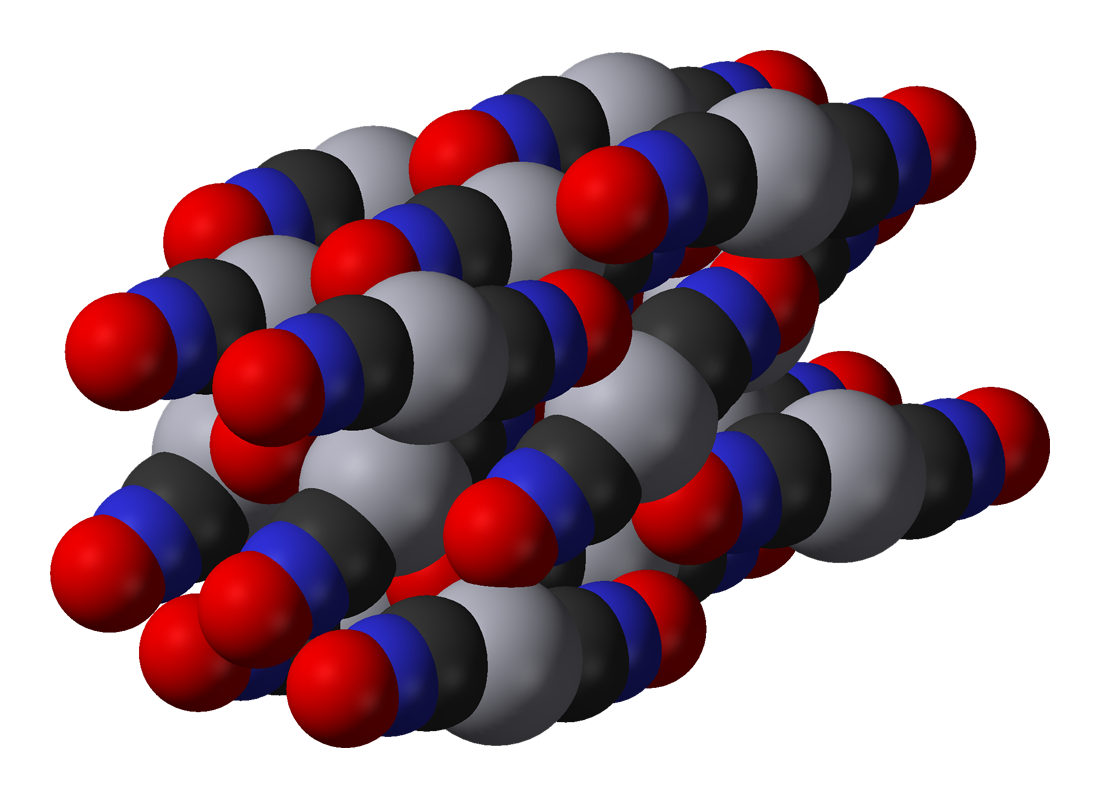

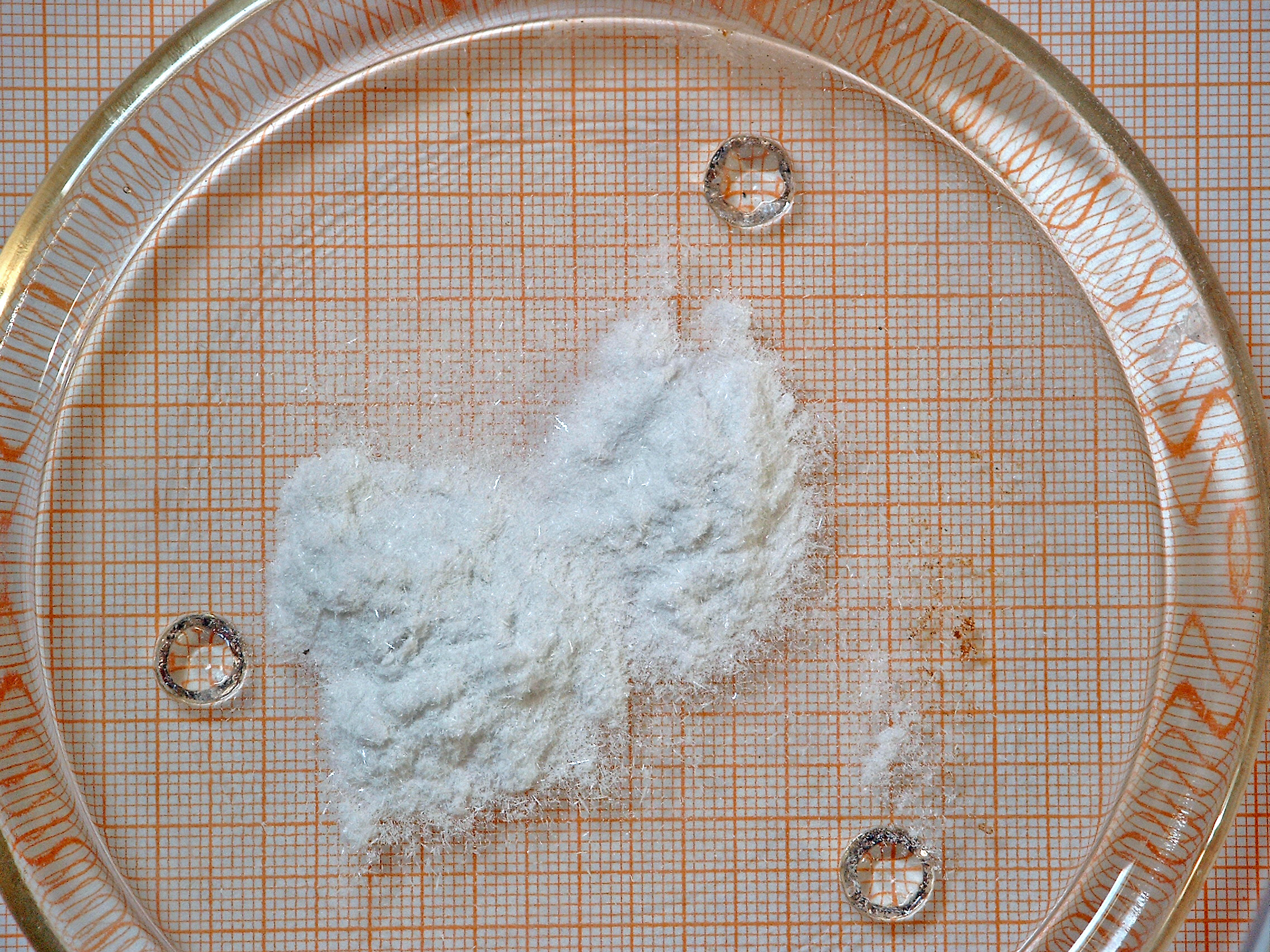

Names
- IUPAC name Mercury(II) fulminate
- Systematic IUPAC name Dioxycyanomercury
- Other names: Fulminated Mercury; Bis(fulminato-kappaC)mercury; Knallquecksilber (German); bis[(oxidoazanylidyne)methyl]mercury

Identifiers
CAS Number	628-86-4
3D model (JSmol)	Interactive image
ChEBI	CHEBI:39152
ChemSpider	9197626
ECHA InfoCard	100.010.053
PubChem CID	11022444
UNII	O8H2ZFF76L
CompTox Dashboard (EPA)	DTXSID40893599
- InChI: InChI=1S/2CNO.Hg/c2*1-2-3; Key: MHWLNQBTOIYJJP-UHFFFAOYSA-N; InChI=1/2CNO.Hg/c2*1-2-3;/rC2HgN2O2/c6-4-1-3-2-5-7 Key: MHWLNQBTOIYJJP-HZIBCBEIAJ
- SMILES: [O-][N+]#C[Hg]C#[N+][O-]

Properties
Chemical formula	Hg(CNO)_{2}
Molar mass	284.626 g·mol^{−1}
Appearance	Grey, pale brown, or white crystalline solid
Density	4.42 g/cm^{3}
Melting point	160 °C (320 °F; 433 K)
Boiling point	356.6 °C (673.9 °F; 629.8 K)
Solubility in water	slightly soluble
Solubility in ethanol	soluble
Solubility in ammonia	soluble

Explosive data
Shock sensitivity	High: 5 cm (2 kg weight, 20 mg, Bureau of Mines apparatus); 4 in (1 lb weight, 30 mg, Picatinny Arsenal apparatus)
Friction sensitivity	High (explodes with fiber & steel shoe tests)
RE factor	37% to 50% (Trauzl lead block)

Hazards
- GHS labelling
Pictograms	(GHS01: Explosive) (GHS06: Toxic) (GHS08: Health hazard) (GHS09: Environmental hazard)
Signal word	Danger
Hazard statements	H200, H301, H311, H331, H373, H410
Precautionary statements	P201, P202, P260, P262, P264, P270, P271, P273, P280, P281, P301+P316, P302+P352, P304+P340, P316, P319, P321, P330, P361+P364, P372, P373, P380, P391, P401, P403+P233, P405, P501
NFPA 704 (fire diamond)	4 1 4
Autoignition temperature	170 °C (338 °F; 443 K)
Threshold limit value (TLV)	0.02 mg/m^{3}, 0.01 mg/m^{3} (TWA), 0.03 mg/m^{3} (skin, 15 minute) (STEL)
- NIOSH (US health exposure limits)
PEL (Permissible)	0.01 mg/m^{3} (TWA, 8h); 0.04 mg/m^{3} (ceiling)
REL (Recommended)	0.01 mg/m^{3} (TWA, skin); 0.03 mg/m^{3} (STEL, skin)
IDLH (Immediate danger)	2 mg/m^{3} (as Hg)

Related compounds
Other anions	Mercury(II) cyanide; Mercury(II) thiocyanate
Other cations	Potassium fulminate; Silver fulminate
- Except where otherwise noted, data are given for materials in their standard state (at 25 °C [77 °F], 100 kPa). verify (what is ?) Infobox references

Mercury(II) fulminate is an explosive and harmful chemical with the chemical formula Hg(CNO)_{2}. When recrystallized from water it exists as the hemihydrate 2 Hg(CNO)_{2}·H_{2}O. The anhydrous form is obtained by recrystallization from ethanol. It is highly sensitive to friction, heat and shock and is mainly used as a trigger for other explosives in percussion caps and detonators. Mercury(II) cyanate, though its chemical formula is identical, has a different atomic arrangement, making the cyanate and fulminate anionic isomers.

First used as a priming composition in small copper caps beginning in the 1820s, mercury fulminate quickly replaced flints as a means to ignite black powder charges in muzzle-loading firearms. Later, during the late 19th century and most of the 20th century, mercury fulminate became widely used in primers for self-contained rifle and pistol ammunition; it was the only practical detonator for firing projectiles until the early 20th century.

Mercury fulminate has the distinct advantage over potassium chlorate of being non-corrosive, but it is known to attack aluminum and magnesium strongly, and brass, bronze, copper, and zinc slowly when dry; when wet it immediately reacts with aluminum and magnesium and strongly attacks brass, bronze, copper and zinc. Today, mercury fulminate has been replaced in primers by more efficient chemical substances. These are non-corrosive, less toxic, and more stable over time; they include lead azide, lead styphnate, and tetrazene derivatives. In addition, none of these compounds requires mercury for manufacture, supplies of which can be unreliable in wartime.

== Preparation ==
Mercury(II) fulminate is prepared by dissolving mercury in nitric acid and adding ethanol to the solution. Edward Charles Howard is credited with first preparing it in 1800. However, Johann Kunckel had discovered the compound more than a century before in the 17th century. The crystal structure of this compound was determined only in 2007.

Silver fulminate can be prepared in a similar way, but this salt is even more unstable than mercury fulminate; it can explode even under water and is impossible to accumulate in large amounts because it detonates under its own weight.

Another preparation method is through reaction of the sodium salt of nitromethane with an aqueous solution of mercury(II) chloride (HgCl_{2}) at 0 °C (32 °F) to form a white precipitate of mercuric nitromethanate. This is digested with warm, dilute hydrochloric acid (HCl) to produce mercury(II) fulminate.

=== Intermediates ===
The oxidation and nitration of ethanol with nitric acid proceeds through a multitude of intermediate compounds before reaching mercury fulminate; acetaldehyde (CH_{3}CHO), nitrosoacetaldehyde (CH_{2}(NO)−CHO), isonitrosoacetaldehyde (CH(=NOH)−CHO), isonitrosoacetic acid (CH(=NOH)−COOH), nitroisonitrosoacetic acid (C(NO_{2})(=NOH)−COOH), formonitrolic acid (O_{2}H−CH=NOH), and fulminic acid (C=NOH) are first formed. The last reacts with mercury to produce the fulminate.

== Decomposition ==
The thermal decomposition of mercury(II) fulminate can begin at temperatures as low as 100 °C (212 °F), though it proceeds at a much higher rate with increasing temperature.

It may be decomposed with relative safety by reaction with ten times its weight of 20% sodium thiosulfate solution. This may evolve some toxic cyanogen gas.

A possible reaction for the decomposition of mercury(II) fulminate yields carbon dioxide gas, nitrogen gas, and a combination of relatively stable mercury salts.

4 Hg(CNO)_{2} → 2 CO_{2} + N_{2} + HgO + 3 Hg(OCN)CN
Hg(CNO)_{2} → 2 CO + N_{2} + Hg
Hg(CNO)_{2} → Hg(O−C≡N)_{2} or Hg(N=C=O)_{2}
2 Hg(CNO)_{2} → 2 CO_{2} + N_{2} + Hg + Hg(CN)_{2}

== Use in pop culture ==
In the sixth episode of the first season of AMC television series Breaking Bad, Walter White throws mercury fulminate onto the floor of Tuco Salamanca's hideout, causing an explosion.

== See also ==
- Fulminic acid
- Potassium fulminate
