= CHNO =

CHNO may refer to:

- CHNO-FM, a Canadian radio station
- CHNO, the chemical formula of several compounds
  - Cyanic acid
  - Isocyanic acid
  - Fulminic acid
  - Isofulminic acid
