= Potassium fulminate =

- $\ce{\mathsf{K+^-C{\equiv}\overset{+}N-O^-}}$
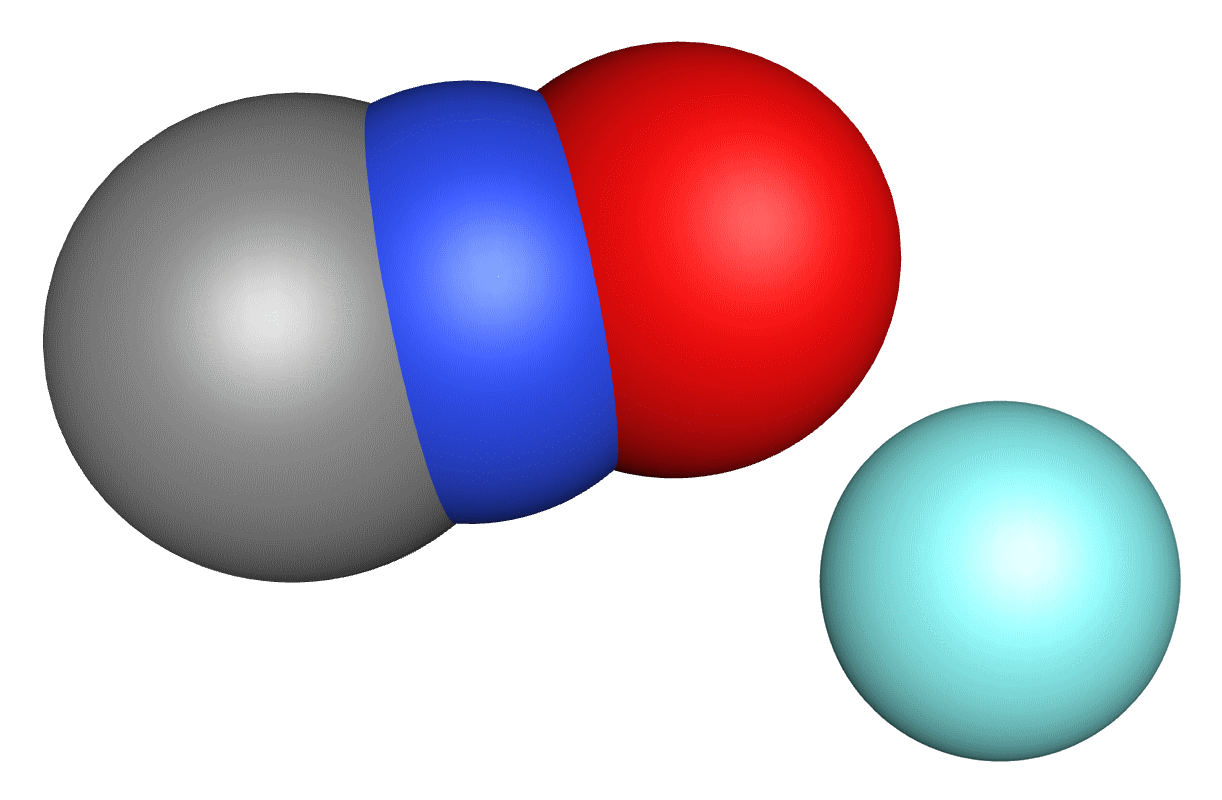

Names
- IUPAC name Potassium oxidoazaniumylidynemethane

Identifiers
CAS Number	15736-99-9
3D model (JSmol)	Interactive image
ChemSpider	9541865
PubChem CID	15975309
CompTox Dashboard (EPA)	DTXSID00580534
- InChI: InChI=1S/CNO.K/c1-2-3;/q-1;+1 Key: LOMWRVTZROPEGG-UHFFFAOYSA-N; InChI=1/CNO.K/c1-2-3;/q-1;+1 Key: LOMWRVTZROPEGG-UHFFFAOYAS
- SMILES: [K+].[C-]#[N+][O-]

Properties
Chemical formula	CKNO
Molar mass	81.115 g·mol^{−1}
Density	1.8 g/cm^{3}

Hazards
- Occupational safety and health (OHS/OSH)
Main hazards	Explosive
- Except where otherwise noted, data are given for materials in their standard state (at 25 °C [77 °F], 100 kPa). verify (what is ?) Infobox references

Potassium fulminate is the potassium salt of the fulminate ion. Its only use, aside from chemical demonstrations, is in the percussion caps for some early rifles. Usually prepared by reacting a potassium amalgam with mercury fulminate, it is much less sensitive due to the ionic bond between potassium and carbon, unlike the covalent bond between mercury and carbon.

== See also ==
- List of explosives
- Fulminic acid
- Fulminate
- Silver fulminate
- Mercury(II) fulminate
- Potassium cyanate
