= CAgNO =

The molecular formula CAgNO (molar mass: 149.89 g/mol, exact mass: 148.9031 u) may refer to:

- Silver cyanate, cyanate salt of silver
- Silver fulminate, highly explosive silver salt of fulminic acid
