= Cyanate ester =

Chemical compounds with an –OCN group

General chemical structure of a cyanate ester

Cyanate esters are chemical compounds in which the hydrogen atom of the cyanic acid is replaced by an organyl group (for example aryl group). The resulting compound is termed a cyanate ester, with the formula R−O−C≡N, where R is an organyl group. Cyanate esters contain a monovalent cyanate group −O−C≡N.

== Synthesis and basic properties ==
Cyanates are a highly exotic functional group; until the 1960s conventional wisdom held that they could not be made at all. The classical alkylation of a cyanate ion is unsuitable for their isolation, having a thermodynamic preference for the isocyanate isomer. In almost all cases, it produces only isocyanate products; in the one exception (S_{N}1 reaction with an unstabilized cation) it gives at most a 50-50 mixture of the products, and the cyanate products are generally isomerized during workup.

Instead, cyanates can be made through either reaction of a cyanogen halide and an alkoxide, or the decomposition of alkoxythiatriazoles. When attempting to make aliphatic cyanates by the former procedure, an unhindered, highly nucleophilic alkoxide anion will add again to the cyanate product to give an iminodiether. But the reaction halts at the cyanate ester stage for all but the most acidic phenols (e.g. picric acid), producing aryl cyanates that "are strikingly stable, can be crystallized and for the most part are even distillable."

The latter procedure either reacts a compound of the form ROC(=S)X (X a good leaving group) with azide anion or nitrosates ROC(=S)NHNH_{2}. The resulting thiatetrazole decomposes highly exothermically at room temperature; if performed at controlled temperature, then the products are a cyanate, nitrogen gas, and elemental sulfur.

Cyanate esters last for weeks pure at 0 °C, but pH extremes induce trimerization to the corresponding cyanurate. Higher temperatures induce a mixture of trimerization and rearrangement to the isocyanate.

== Use in resins ==
Chemical structure of bisphenol A cyanate ester, used in cyanate resins

Cyanate esters can be cured and postcured by heating, either alone at elevated temperatures or at lower temperatures in presence of a suitable catalyst. The most common catalysts are transition metal complexes of cobalt, copper, manganese and zinc. The result is a thermoset material with a very high glass-transition temperature (T_{g}) of up to 400 °C, and a very low dielectric constant, providing excellent long term thermal stability at elevated end use temperatures, very good fire, smoke and toxicity performance and specific suitability for printed circuit boards installed in critical electrical devices. This is also due to its low moisture uptake. This property, together with a higher toughness compared to epoxies, also makes it a valuable material in aerospace applications. For example, the Lynx Mark II spaceplane is primarily made of carbon/cyanate ester.

The chemistry of the cure reaction is a trimerization of three CN groups to a triazine ring. When the monomer contains two cyanate groups the resulting structure is a 3D polymer network. Thermoset polymer matrix properties can be fine tuned by the choice of substituents in the bisphenolic compound. Bisphenol A and novolac based cyanate esters are the major products; bisphenol F and bisphenol E are also used. The aromatic ring of the bisphenol can be substituted with an allylic group for improved toughness of the material. Cyanate esters can also be mixed with bismaleimides to form BT-resins or with epoxy resins to optimize the end use properties.
