= Carbimide =

Carbimide may refer to:

- Carbon imide (carbodiimide, tautomer of cyanamide)
- Carbonyl imide (isocyanic acid)
