= Silver lactate =

Names
- Other names silver; 1-hydroxy-1-oxopropan-2-olate

Identifiers
| CAS Number | 128-00-7 |
| 3D model (JSmol) | Interactive image |
| ChemSpider | 138722 |
| ECHA InfoCard | 100.036.221 |
| EC Number | 239-859-3 |
| PubChem CID | 3032292 |
| UNII | 1O6T8HG11V |
| CompTox Dashboard (EPA) | DTXSID50875568 |
- InChI: InChI=1S/C3H5O3.Ag/c1-2(4)3(5)6;/h2H,1H3,(H,5,6);/q-1;+1 Key: CUPCAVOUAWGFEI-UHFFFAOYSA-N
- SMILES: [Ag+].[O-]C(C(=O)O)C

Properties
| Chemical formula | CH_{3}CH(OH)COOAg |
| Molar mass | 196.93 g/mol |
| Appearance | Gray to purple powder or flakes |
| Melting point | 120–122 °C (248–252 °F; 393–395 K) |
| Boiling point | 227.6 °C (441.7 °F; 500.8 K) |
| Solubility in water | Soluble |
| Solubility | Slightly soluble in ethanol |

Hazards
- GHS labelling
| Pictograms | (GHS07: Exclamation mark) |
| Signal word | Warning |
| Hazard statements | H315, H319, H335 |
| Precautionary statements | P302, P305, P338, P351, P352 |
| NFPA 704 (fire diamond) | 2 0 1 |
- Except where otherwise noted, data are given for materials in their standard state (at 25 °C [77 °F], 100 kPa). Infobox references

Silver lactate is an organic chemical compound, a salt of silver and lactic acid with the formula CH_{3}CH(OH)COOAg. It forms light gray crystals. A monohydrate (CH_{3}CH(OH)COOAg•H_{2}O) exists.

== Synthesis ==
Silver lactate can be made by the reaction of silver carbonate with lactic acid.

== Reactions ==
Silver lactate is a reagent for the precipitation of uric acid.

The compound reacts with triphenylphosphine gold chloride in a mixed solvent of benzene and dichloromethane to obtain colorless triphenylphosphine gold lactate.

The compound reacts with a tetraphosphine ligand, dppbpda, to obtain a coordination polymer [(dppbpda)Ag_{4}(CH_{3}CH(OH)COO)_{4}]_{n}.
