= C3H3N3O3 =

The molecular formula C_{3}H_{3}N_{3}O_{3} (molar mass: 129.08 g/mol, exact mass: 129.0174 u) may refer to:

- Cyanuric acid
- Cyamelide
