= Fulminating silver =

Fulminating silver is a historic name which may apply to a number of silver based explosives which "fulminate" or detonate easily and violently. It has no exact chemical or dictionary definition, but may refer to:

- silver fulminate (which, confusingly, is the only "fulminating silver" to be a silver compound with the fulminate anion)
- silver azide, AgN_{3}
- a mixture, a decomposition product of Tollens' reagent
- silver nitride, Ag_{3}N - one of the earliest silver based explosives
- the alchemical substance "Argentum Fulminans"

The stability of many of these compounds can vary depending on how they are stored or handled, with levels of hydration often being a major factor.
