= Silver fulminate =

High explosive used in bang snaps

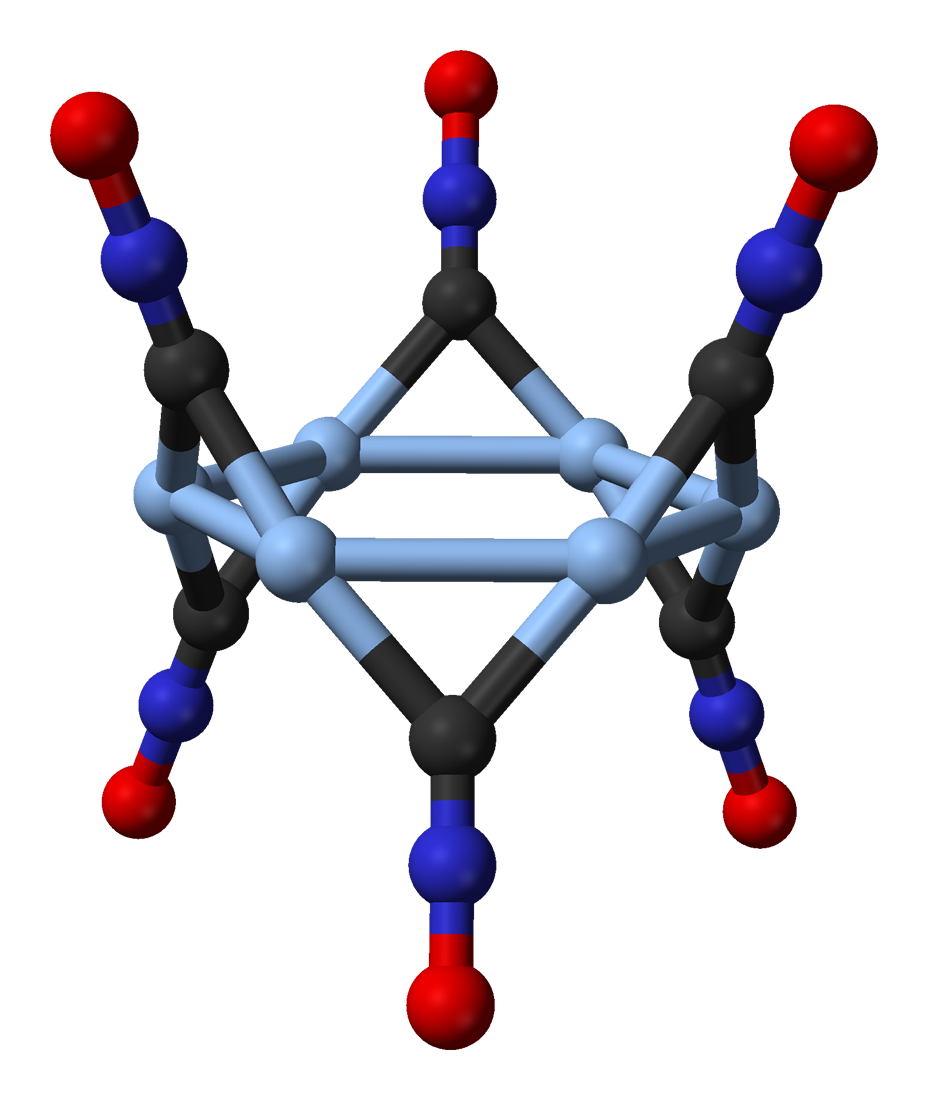
- Ball-and-stick model of the cyclic hexamer in trigonal silver fulminate

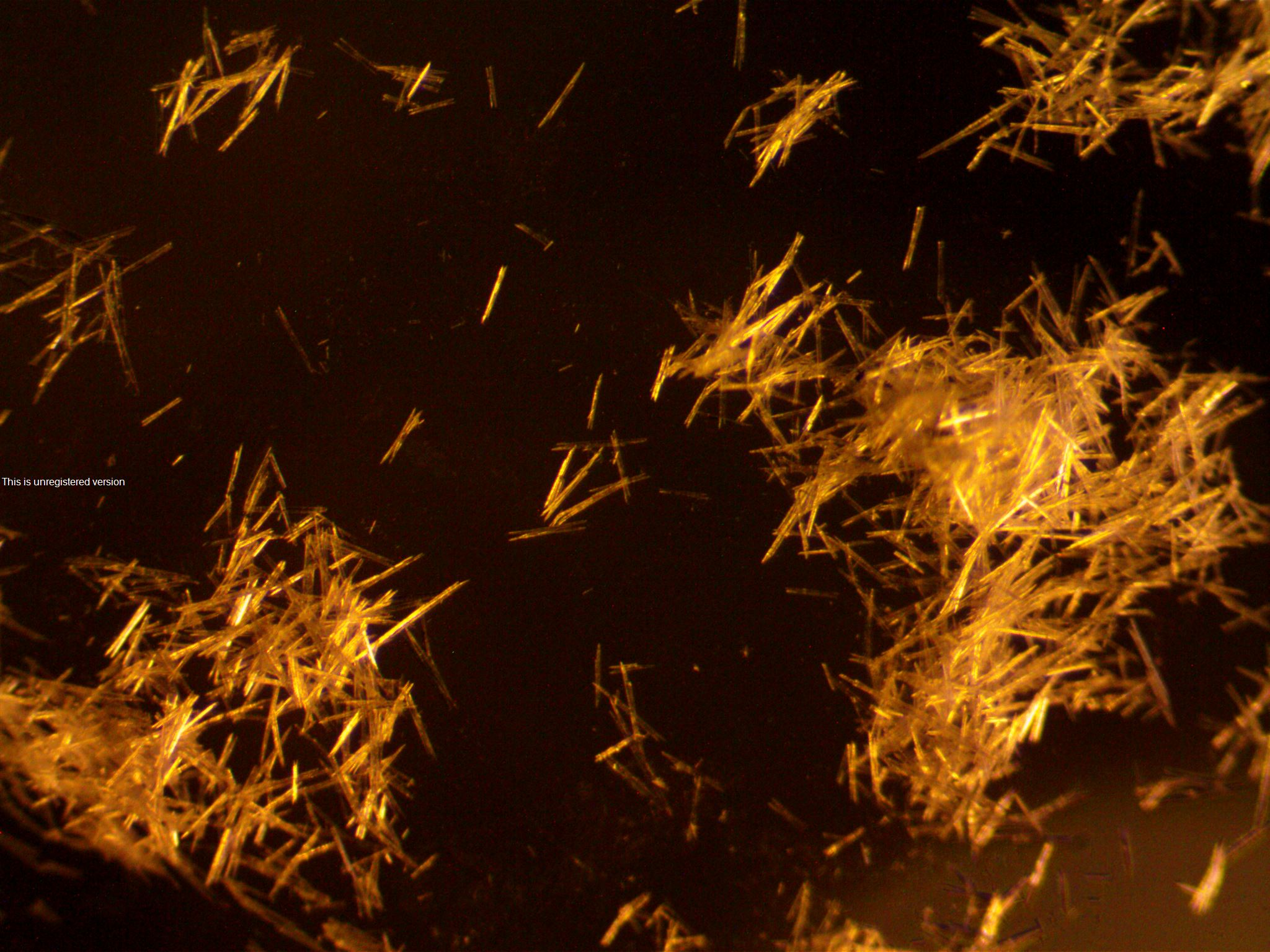
- Needles of silver fulminate

Names
- IUPAC names Silver carbidooxidonitrate(1−); Silver oxidoazaniumylidynemethane
- Other names Silver fulminate Silver(I) fulminate Argentous fulminate

Identifiers
CAS Number	5610-59-3
3D model (JSmol)	Interactive image
ChemSpider	56347
PubChem CID	62585
UNII	5QNF7XT857
CompTox Dashboard (EPA)	DTXSID60971484
- InChI: InChI=1S/CNO.Ag/c1-2-3;/q-1;+1 Key: AZPZMMZIYMVPCK-UHFFFAOYSA-N
- SMILES: [C-]#[N+][O-].[Ag+]

Properties
Chemical formula	AgCNO
Molar mass	149.885 g/mol
Density	3.938 g/cm^{3}

Explosive data
Shock sensitivity	Extremely high
Friction sensitivity	Extremely high

Hazards
- Occupational safety and health (OHS/OSH)
Main hazards	Sensitive high explosive
NFPA 704 (fire diamond)	3 3 4
Autoignition temperature	170 °C (338 °F; 443 K)
- Except where otherwise noted, data are given for materials in their standard state (at 25 °C [77 °F], 100 kPa). verify (what is ?) Infobox references

Silver fulminate (AgCNO) is the highly explosive silver salt of fulminic acid.

Silver fulminate is a primary explosive, but has limited use as such due to its extreme sensitivity to impact, heat, pressure, and electricity. The compound becomes progressively sensitive as it is aggregated, even in small amounts; the touch of a falling feather, the impact of a single water droplet, or a small static discharge are all capable of explosively detonating an unconfined pile of silver fulminate no larger than a dime and no heavier than a few milligrams. Aggregating larger quantities is impossible, due to the compound's tendency to self-detonate under its own weight.

Silver fulminate was first prepared in 1800 by Edward Charles Howard in his research project to prepare a large variety of fulminates. Along with mercury fulminate, it is the only fulminate stable enough for commercial use. Detonators using silver fulminate were used to initiate picric acid in 1885, but since have been used only by the Italian Navy. The current commercial use has been in producing non-damaging novelty noisemakers as children's toys.

== Properties ==
Fulminates are toxic, about the same as cyanides. When pure, silver fulminate is chemically stable, not decomposing after years of storage. Like many silver salts, it darkens with light exposure. It is slightly soluble in cold water and can be recrystallized using hot water. It can also be recrystallized from a 20% solution of ammonium acetate. It is not hygroscopic and can explode when moist or under water; it was reported to remain explosive after 37 years under water. It explodes upon contact with concentrated sulfuric acid or chlorine or bromine, but not when contacting iodine. It is insoluble in nitric acid, but dissolves in ammonia, alkali chlorides, alkali cyanides, aniline, pyridine, and potassium iodide by forming complexes. Concentrated hydrochloric acid decomposes it non-explosively with a hissing noise; thiosulfate also decomposes it non-explosively, and can be used for disposal.

== Structure ==
Silver fulminate occurs in two polymorphic forms, an orthorhombic one and a trigonal one with a rhombohedral lattice. The trigonal polymorph consists of cyclic hexamers, (AgCNO)_{6}.

== Preparation ==
This compound can be prepared by pouring a solution of silver nitrate in nitric acid into ethanol, under careful control of the reaction conditions, to avoid an explosion.

AgNO_{3} + HNO_{3} + C_{2}H_{5}OH → AgCNO + byproducts

The reaction is usually done at 80–90 °C; at 30 °C, the precipitate may not form. Only tiny amounts of silver fulminate should be prepared at once, as even the weight of the crystals can cause them to self-detonate.

Another way to make silver fulminate is to react silver carbonate with ammonia in solution.

4 Ag_{2}CO_{3} + 4 NH_{3} → 4 AgCNO + 6 H_{2}O + 4 Ag + O_{2}

Silver fulminate also forms when nitrogen oxide gas is passed through a solution of silver nitrate in ethanol.

Silver fulminate can be prepared unintentionally, when an acidic solution of silver nitrate comes in contact with alcohol. This is a hazard in some formulations of chemically silvering mirrors.

== Novelty explosive ==
Silver fulminate, often in combination with potassium chlorate, is used in trick noise-makers known as "throw-downs", "crackers", "snappers", "whippersnappers", "pop-its", "bang snaps" or "fun snaps", a popular type of novelty firework. They contain approximately 200 milligrams of fine gravel coated with a minute quantity (approximately 80 micrograms) of silver fulminate. When thrown against a hard surface, the impact is sufficient to detonate the tiny quantity of explosive, creating a small salute from the supersonic detonation. Snaps are designed to be incapable of producing damage (even when detonated against skin) due to the buffering effect provided by the much greater mass of the gravel medium. It is also the chemical found in Christmas crackers having first been used for that purpose by Tom Smith in 1860. The chemical is painted on one of two narrow strips of card, with abrasive on the second. When the cracker is pulled, the abrasive detonates the silver fulminate.

A fulminate mixture with 10–20% potassium chlorate is cheaper and more brisant than the fulminate alone.

== Silver fulminate and "fulminating silver" ==
Silver fulminate is often confused with silver nitride, silver azide, or fulminating silver. "Fulminating silver", though always referring to an explosive silver-containing substance, is an ambiguous term. While it may be a synonym of silver fulminate, it may also refer to the nitride or azide, the decomposition product of Tollens' reagent, or an alchemical mixture, which does not contain the fulminate anion.

== See also ==
- Primary explosive
- Justus von Liebig
- Friedrich Woehler
- Silver cyanate
- Isomerism
- Fulminate
- Fulminic acid
- Potassium fulminate
- Mercury(II) fulminate
