= Silver cyanate =

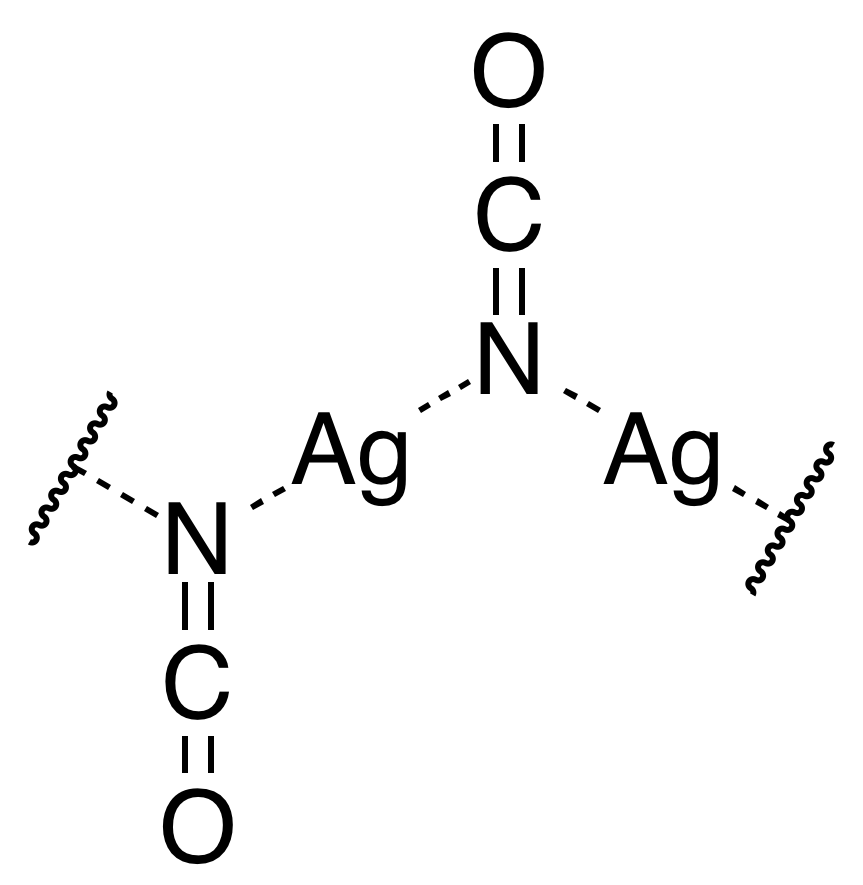

Names
- Systematic IUPAC name Silver(I) cyanate

Identifiers
CAS Number	3315-16-0
3D model (JSmol)	Interactive image
ChemSpider	69282
ECHA InfoCard	100.020.007
PubChem CID	76827
CompTox Dashboard (EPA)	DTXSID10883967
- InChI: InChI=1S/CHNO.Ag/c2-1-3;/h3H;/q;+1/p-1 Key: DWBPIWPCOSHWCK-UHFFFAOYSA-M; InChI=1/CHNO.Ag/c2-1-3;/h3H;/q;+1/p-1 Key: DWBPIWPCOSHWCK-REWHXWOFAQ
- SMILES: [Ag+].[O-]C#N

Properties
Chemical formula	AgOCN
Molar mass	149.885 g/mol
Appearance	colourless
Density	4g/cm^{3}
Melting point	652 °C (1,206 °F; 925 K)
Boiling point	1,085 °C (1,985 °F; 1,358 K)
Solubility in water	Soluble in ammonia, nitric acid, potassium cyanide, ammonium hydroxide. Insoluble in alcohol and dilute acids.

Hazards
- GHS labelling
Pictograms	(GHS07: Exclamation mark)
Signal word	Warning
Hazard statements	H302+H312+H332
Precautionary statements	P261, P270, P280, P301+P312+P330, P302+P352+P312, P304+P340+P312, P362+P364, P501
NFPA 704 (fire diamond)	2 0 0
Safety data sheet (SDS)	MSDS
- Except where otherwise noted, data are given for materials in their standard state (at 25 °C [77 °F], 100 kPa). Infobox references

Silver cyanate is the cyanate salt of silver. It is a white/beige powder. It was likely discovered in the mid 1820's by Friedrich Wöhler, a German chemist, being used by Wöhler to synthesize urea. It later sparked a debate with Justus von Liebig, as Liebig had a similar compound, silver fulminate, an isomer of silver cyanate, which he believed to be the same composition of exactly one of each silver, oxygen, carbon, and nitrogen. While it did contain the same atoms, its atomic structure was inherently different; silver fulminate has a weak Ag-C bond, while in silver cyanate, the silver is bonded with nitrogen. This debate led to the discovery of isomerism.

== Structure ==
Silver cyanate crystallises in the monoclinic crystal system in space group P2_{1}/m with parameters a = 547.3 pm, b = 637.2 pm, c = 341.6 pm, and β = 91°. Each unit cell contains two cyanate ions and two silver ions. The silver ions are each equidistant from two nitrogen atoms forming a straight N–Ag–N group. The nitrogen atoms are each coordinated to two silver atoms, so that there are zigzag chains of alternating silver and nitrogen atoms going in the direction of the monoclinic "b" axis, with the cyanate ions perpendicular to that axis.

== Preparation ==
Silver cyanate can be made by the reaction of potassium cyanate with silver nitrate in aqueous solution, from which it precipitates as a solid:

AgNO_{3} + KNCO → Ag(NCO) + K^{+} + NO^{−}_{3}

Alternatively, a reaction with urea, forming ammonium nitrate as a byproduct may be used:

AgNO_{3} + CO(NH_{2})_{2} → AgNCO + NH_{4}NO_{3}

This is analogous to the reaction used for the industrial production of sodium cyanate.

== Reactions ==
Silver cyanate reacts with nitric acid to form silver nitrate, carbon dioxide, and ammonium nitrate:

AgNCO + 2 HNO_{3} + H_{2}O → AgNO_{3} + CO_{2} + NH_{4}NO_{3}

== See also ==
- Silver fulminate
