= Fétizon oxidation =

Chemical reaction

Fétizon oxidation is the oxidation of primary and secondary alcohols utilizing the compound silver(I) carbonate absorbed onto the surface of celite also known as Fétizon's reagent first employed by Marcel Fétizon in 1968. It is a mild reagent, suitable for both acid and base sensitive compounds. Its great reactivity with lactols makes the Fétizon oxidation a useful method to obtain lactones from a diol. The reaction is inhibited significantly by polar groups within the reaction system as well as steric hindrance of the α-hydrogen of the alcohol.

== Preparation ==
Fétizon's reagent is typically prepared by adding silver nitrate to an aqueous solution of a carbonate, such as sodium carbonate or potassium bicarbonate, while being vigorously stirred in the presence of purified celite.

== Mechanism ==
A proposed mechanism for the oxidation of an alcohol by Fétizon's reagent involves single electron oxidation of both the alcoholic oxygen and the hydrogen alpha to the alcohol by two atoms of silver(I) within the celite surface. The carbonate ion then proceeds to deprotonate the resulting carbonyl generating bicarbonate which is further protonated by the additionally generated hydrogen cation to cause elimination of water and generation of carbon dioxide.

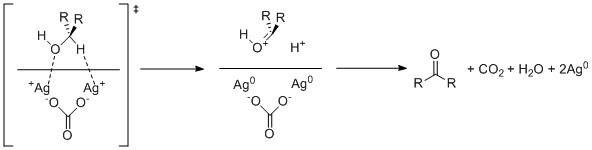
Silver carbonate on celite oxidizes alcohols through single electron oxidation by the silver cations

Even weakly associating functionalities such as olefins can interfere with the association of the reactant alcohol with Fetizon's reagent

The rate limiting step of this reaction is proposed to be the initial association of the alcohol to the silver ions. As a result, the presence of even weakly associating ligands to the silver can inhibit the reaction greatly. As a result, even slightly polar solvents of any variety, such as ethyl acetate or methyl ethyl ketone, are avoided when using this reagent as they competitively associate with the reagent. Additional polar functionalities of the reactant should also be avoided whenever possible as even the presence of an alkene can sometimes reduce the reactivity of a substrate 50 fold. Commonly employed solvents such as benzene and xylene are extremely non-polar and further acceleration of the reaction can be achieved through the use of the more non-polar heptane. The solvent is also typically refluxed to drive the reaction with heat and remove the water generated by the reaction through azeotropic distillation. Steric hindrance of the hydrogen alpha to the alcohol is a major determination of the rate of oxidation as it affects the rate of association. Tertiary alcohols lacking an alpha hydrogen are selected against and generally do not oxidize in the presence of Fétizon's reagent.

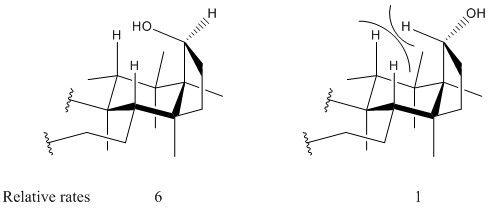
The oxidation of an alcohol with an alpha hydrogen sterically hindered by axial hydrogens proceeds slower with Fetizon's reagent

Increasing the amount of celite used in the reagent accelerates the rate of the reaction by increasing the surface area available to react. However, increasing the amount of celite past 900 grams per mole of silver(I) carbonate begins to slow the reaction due to dilution effects.

== Reactivity ==
Fétizon's reagent is used primarily in the oxidation of primary or secondary alcohols to aldehydes or ketones with a slight selectivity toward secondary alcohols and unsaturated alcohols. The reaction is typically done in a refluxing dry non-polar organic solvent with copious stirring. The reaction time varies with the structure of the alcohol and is typically completed within three hours. A very attractive property of Fétizon's reagent is its ability to be separated from the reaction product by physically filtering it out and washing with benzene. The inability of Fétizon's reagent to oxidize tertiary alcohols makes it extremely useful in the monooxidation of a [1,2] diol in which one of the alcohols is tertiary while avoiding cleavage of the carbon-carbon bond.

Fetizon's reagent oxidizes secondary alcohols selectively in the presence of tertiary alcohols

The mildness and structural sensitivity of the reagent also makes this reagent ideal for the monooxidation of a symmetric diol.

Fetizon's reagent is capable of monooxidizing a symmetric diol

Lactols are extremely sensitive to Fétizon's reagent, being oxidized very quickly to a lactone functionality. This allows for the selective oxidation of lactols in the presence of other alcohols. This also allows for a classic use of Fétizon's reagent to form lactones from a primary diol. By oxidizing one of the alcohols to an aldehyde, the second alcohol equilibrates with the aldehyde to form a lactol which is reacted quickly with more Fétizon's reagent to trap the cyclic intermediate as a lactone. This method allows for the synthesis of seven-member lactones which are traditionally more challenging to synthesize.

Fetizon's reagent oxidize lactols into lactones

Treatment of a terminal diol with Fetizon's reagent can result in lactone formation

Phenol functional groups can be oxidized to their respective quinone forms. These quinones can further couple within solution producing numerous dimerizations depending upon their substituents.

Fetizon's reagent oxidizes phenols to quinones which can oxidatively couple to one another

Amines have been shown to oxidize in the presence of Fétizon's reagent to enamines and iminium cations that have been trapped, but can also be selected against in a compound with more easily oxidized alcohol functionalities. Fétizon's reagent can also being used to facilitate cycloaddition of a 4-hydroxy-2-furoquinilone and an olefin to form dihydrofuroquinolinones.

== Protecting groups ==
Para-methoxybenzyl (PMB) is a commonly used protecting group for alcohols against Fétizon's reagent. As Fétizon's oxidation is a neutral reaction, acid and base sensitive protecting groups are also compatible with the reagent and by products generated.

== Sensitive groups ==
While tertiary alcohols are typically not affected by Fétizon's reagent, tertiary propargylic alcohols have been shown to oxidize under these conditions and results in the fragmentation of the alcohol with an alkyne leaving group.

A tertiary propargylic alcohol is fragmented upon treatment with Fetizon's reagent

Halohydrins that possess a trans stereochemistry have been demonstrated to form epoxides and transposed products in the presence of Fétizon's reagent. Halohydrins possessing a cis-stereochemistry seem to perform a typical Fétizon's oxidation to a ketone.

Trans-halohydrins can transpose or form epoxides upon treatment with Fetizon's reagent

[1,3] diols have a tendency to eliminate water following the monooxidation by Fétizon's reagent to form an enone.

Upon oxidation with Fetizon's reagent, a 1,3 diol may eliminate water to produce an enone

Under differing structural conditions, [1,2] diols can form diketones in the presence of Fétizon's reagent. However, oxidative carbon-carbon bond cleavage may also occur.

== Applications ==
Since its discovery as a useful method of oxidation, Fétizon's reagent has been used in the total synthesis of numerous molecules such as (±)-bukittinggine. Fétizon's reagent has also been employed extensively in the study of various sugar chemistry, to achieve selective oxidation of tri and tetra methylated aldoses to aldolactones, oxidation of D-xylose and L-arabinose to D-threose and L-erythrose respectively, and oxidation of L-sorbose to afford L-threose among many others.
