= Silver carbonate =

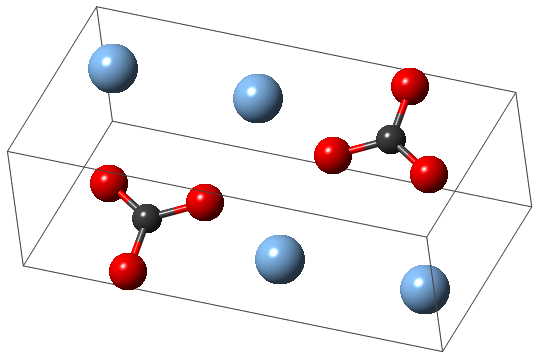
- Crystal structure of silver carbonate

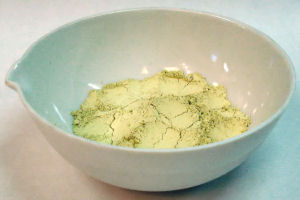
- Sample of microcrystaline silver carbonate

Names
- IUPAC name Silver(I) carbonate
- Other names Argentous carbonate

Identifiers
CAS Number	534-16-7
3D model (JSmol)	Interactive image
ChemSpider	83768
ECHA InfoCard	100.007.811
EC Number	208-590-3
MeSH	silver+carbonate
PubChem CID	92796
UNII	V9WU3IKN4Q
CompTox Dashboard (EPA)	DTXSID9042384
- InChI: InChI=1S/CH2O3.2Ag/c2-1(3)4;;/h(H2,2,3,4);;/q;2*+1/p-2 Key: KQTXIZHBFFWWFW-UHFFFAOYSA-L; InChI=1/CH2O3.2Ag/c2-1(3)4;;/h(H2,2,3,4);;/q;2*+1/p-2 Key: KQTXIZHBFFWWFW-NUQVWONBAD
- SMILES: [Ag]OC(=O)O[Ag]

Properties
Chemical formula	Ag_{2}CO_{3}
Molar mass	275.75 g/mol
Appearance	Pale yellow crystals
Odor	Odorless
Density	6.077 g/cm^{3}
Melting point	218 °C (424 °F; 491 K) decomposes from 120 °C
Solubility in water	0.031 g/L (15 °C); 0.032 g/L (25 °C); 0.5 g/L (100 °C)
Solubility product (K_{sp})	8.46·10^{−12}
Solubility	Insoluble in ethanol, liquid ammonia, acetates, acetone
Magnetic susceptibility (χ)	−80.9·10^{−6} cm^{3}/mol

Structure
Crystal structure	Monoclinic, mP12 (295 K); Trigonal, hP36 (β-form, 453 K); Hexagonal, hP18 (α-form, 476 K)
Space group	P2_{1}/m, No. 11 (295 K); P31c, No. 159 (β-form, 453 K); P6̅2m, No. 189 (α-form, 476 K)
Point group	2/m (295 K); 3m (β-form, 453 K); 6̅m2 (α-form, 476 K)
Lattice constant	a = 4.8521(2) Å, b = 9.5489(4) Å, c = 3.2536(1) Å (295 K) α = 90°, β = 91.9713(3)°, γ = 90°

Thermochemistry
Heat capacity (C)	112.3 J/mol·K
Std molar entropy (S^{⦵}_{298})	167.4 J/mol·K
Std enthalpy of formation (Δ_{f}H^{⦵}_{298})	−505.8 kJ/mol
Gibbs free energy (Δ_{f}G^{⦵})	−436.8 kJ/mol

Hazards
- Occupational safety and health (OHS/OSH)
Inhalation hazards	Irritant
- GHS labelling
Pictograms	(GHS05: Corrosive) (GHS09: Environmental hazard)
Signal word	Danger
Hazard statements	H315, H319, H335
Precautionary statements	P261, P305+P351+P338
NFPA 704 (fire diamond)	0 0 0
- Lethal dose or concentration (LD, LC)
LD_{50} (median dose)	3.73 g/kg (mice, oral)
- Except where otherwise noted, data are given for materials in their standard state (at 25 °C [77 °F], 100 kPa). verify (what is ?) Infobox references

Silver carbonate is the chemical compound with the formula Ag_{2}CO_{3}. This salt is yellow but typical samples are grayish due to the presence of elemental silver. It is poorly soluble in water, like most transition metal carbonates.

== Preparation and reactions ==
Silver carbonate can be prepared by combining aqueous solutions of sodium carbonate with a deficiency of silver nitrate.

2 AgNO_{3}(aq) + Na_{2}CO_{3}(aq) → Ag_{2}CO_{3}(s) + 2 NaNO_{3}(aq)

Freshly prepared silver carbonate is colourless, but the solid quickly turns yellow.

Silver carbonate reacts with ammonia to give the diamminesilver(I) ([Ag(NH_{3})_{2}]^{+}) complex ion. Like other diamminesilver(I) solutions, including Tollens' reagent, there is a possibility that explosive Silver nitride may precipitate out of the solution. Silver nitride was previously known as fulminating silver but due to confusions with silver fulminate it has been discontinued by the IUPAC.

With hydrofluoric acid, it gives silver fluoride.

The thermal conversion of silver carbonate to silver metal proceeds via formation of silver oxide:

Ag_{2}CO_{3} → Ag_{2}O + CO_{2}
2 Ag_{2}O → 4 Ag + O_{2}

== Uses ==
The principal use of silver carbonate is for the production of silver powder for use in microelectronics. It is reduced with formaldehyde, producing silver free of alkali metals:

Ag_{2}CO_{3} + CH_{2}O → 2 Ag + 2 CO_{2} + H_{2}

=== Organic synthesis ===
Silver carbonate is used as a reagent in organic synthesis. In the Fétizon oxidation, silver carbonate on Celite serves as an oxidising agent to form:

- aldehydes from primary alcohols,
- ketones from secondary alcohols,
- keto-alcohols from diols,
- and ketones from hydroxymethyl compounds.

In the Koenigs-Knorr reaction it is used to convert alkyl bromides to the methyl ethers. It is also employed to convert alkyl bromides into alcohols. As a base, it has been used in the Wittig reaction. and in C-H bond activation.
