= BT-Epoxy =

Polymer used in printed circuit boards

BT-Epoxy (BT short for Bismaleimide-Triazine resin) is one of a number of thermoset resins used in printed circuit boards (PCBs). It is a mixture of epoxy resin, a common raw material for PCBs and BT resins. This is in turn a mixture of bismaleimide, which is also used as a raw material for PCBs and cyanate ester. Three cyano groups of the cyanate ester are trimerized to a triazine ring structure, hence the T in the name. In presence of a bismaleimide, the double bond of the maleimide group can copolymerize with the cyano groups to heterocyclic 6-membered aromatic ring structures with two nitrogen atoms (pyrimidines). The cure reaction occurs at temperatures up to 250 °C (482 °F), and is catalyzed by strongly basic molecules like Dabco (diazabicyclooctane) and 4-DMAP (4-dimethylaminopyridine). Products with very high glass transition temperatures (T_{g}) up to 300 °C (572 °F) and very low dielectric constant can be obtained. These properties make these materials very attractive for use in PCBs, which are often subjected to such conditions.

== See also ==
- Printed circuit board
- Synthetic resin
- Epoxy
- Electronics industry § Manufacturing
