= Sodium cyanate =

Identifiers
CAS Number	917-61-3
3D model (JSmol)	Interactive image
Beilstein Reference	3655041
ChEBI	CHEBI:38906
ChEMBL	ChEMBL1644696
ChemSpider	12922
ECHA InfoCard	100.011.846
EC Number	213-030-6
MeSH	C009281
PubChem CID	517096
UNII	8UFS3JRV8P
CompTox Dashboard (EPA)	DTXSID2061274
- InChI: InChI=1S/CHNO.Na/c2-1-3;/h3H;/q;+1/p-1 Key: ZVCDLGYNFYZZOK-UHFFFAOYSA-M
- SMILES: C(#N)[O-].[Na+]

Properties
Chemical formula	NaOCN
Molar mass	65.01 g/mol
Appearance	white crystalline solid
Odor	odorless
Density	1.893 g/cm^{3}
Melting point	550 °C (1,022 °F; 823 K)
Solubility in water	11.6 g/100 mL (25 °C)
Solubility	ethanol: 0.22 g/100 mL (0 °C) dimethylformamide: 0.05 g/100 mL (25 °C) slightly soluble in ammonia, benzene insoluble in diethyl ether

Structure
Crystal structure	body centered rhombohedral

Thermochemistry
Heat capacity (C)	86.6 J/mol K
Std molar entropy (S^{⦵}_{298})	119.2 J/mol K
Std enthalpy of formation (Δ_{f}H^{⦵}_{298})	−400 kJ/mol

Hazards
- GHS labelling
Pictograms	(GHS07: Exclamation mark)
Signal word	Warning
Hazard statements	H302, H412
Precautionary statements	P264, P270, P273, P301+P312, P330, P501
- Lethal dose or concentration (LD, LC)
LD_{50} (median dose)	1500 mg/kg (rat, oral)
- Except where otherwise noted, data are given for materials in their standard state (at 25 °C [77 °F], 100 kPa). Infobox references

Sodium cyanate is the inorganic compound with the formula NaOCN. A white solid, it is the sodium salt of the cyanate anion.

== Structure ==
The anion is described by two resonance structures: N≡C−O^{−} and ^{−}N=C=O

The salt adopts a body centered rhombohedral crystal lattice structure (trigonal crystal system) at room temperature.

== Preparation ==
Sodium cyanate is prepared industrially by the reaction of urea with sodium carbonate at elevated temperature.

2OC(NH_{2})_{2} + Na_{2}CO_{3} → 2Na(NCO) + CO_{2} + 2NH_{3} + H_{2}O

Sodium allophanate is observed as an intermediate:

H_{2}NC(O)NHCO_{2}Na → NaOCN + NH_{3} + CO_{2}

It can also be prepared in the laboratory by oxidation of a cyanide in aqueous solution by a mild oxidizing agent such as lead oxide.

== Uses and reactions ==
The main use of sodium cyanate is for steel hardening.

Sodium cyanate is used to produce cyanic acid, often in situ:

NaOCN + HCl → HOCN + NaCl

This approach is exploited for condensation with amines to give unsymmetrical ureas:

HOCN + RNH_{2} → RNHC(O)NH_{2}

Such urea derivatives have a range of biological activity.

== See also ==
- Cyanate
