= Cyamelide =

Names
- IUPAC name 1,3,5-Trioxane-2,4,6-triimine
- Other names Cyamelide, insoluble cyanuric acid

Identifiers
| CAS Number | 462-02-2 |
| 3D model (JSmol) | Interactive image |
| ChEBI | CHEBI:38042 |
| ChemSpider | 10468516 |
| Gmelin Reference | 240323 |
| PubChem CID | 12305305 |
| UNII | AJA92R648N |
| CompTox Dashboard (EPA) | DTXSID401032246 |
- InChI: InChI=1S/C3H3N3O3/c4-1-7-2(5)9-3(6)8-1/h4-6H Key: SMEDVXJKKOXLCP-UHFFFAOYSA-N
- SMILES: C1(=N)OC(=N)OC(=N)O1

Properties
| Chemical formula | C_{3}H_{3}N_{3}O_{3} |
| Molar mass | 129.075 g·mol^{−1} |
| Appearance | White solid |
| Density | 2.08 g/cm^{3} |
| Solubility in water | Low |
- Except where otherwise noted, data are given for materials in their standard state (at 25 °C [77 °F], 100 kPa). Infobox references

Cyamelide is an amorphous white solid with the approximate formula (HNCO)_{x}. It is the product of the polymerisation of cyanic acid together with its cyclic trimer cyanuric acid. It is a porcelain-like white substance which is insoluble in water.
