= Silver nitride =

Names
- IUPAC name Silver(I) nitride
- Other names Fulminating silver Argentous nitride

Identifiers
CAS Number	20737-02-4
3D model (JSmol)	Interactive image
ChemSpider	10746013
- InChI: InChI=1S/3Ag.N/q3*+1;-3 Key: XSNQEMWVLMRPFR-UHFFFAOYSA-N; InChI=1/3Ag.N/q3*+1;-3 Key: XSNQEMWVLMRPFR-UHFFFAOYAP
- SMILES: [Ag+].[Ag+].[Ag+].[N-3]

Properties
Chemical formula	Ag_{3}N
Molar mass	337.62
Appearance	Black solid
Density	9 g/cm^{3}
Boiling point	Explodes at 165 °C
Solubility in water	Slightly
Solubility	Decomposes in acids

Structure
Crystal structure	face centered cubic

Thermochemistry
Std enthalpy of formation (Δ_{f}H^{⦵}_{298})	199.1 kJ/mol
Gibbs free energy (Δ_{f}G^{⦵})	314.4 kJ/mol

Hazards
- Occupational safety and health (OHS/OSH)
Main hazards	Explosive
Flash point	Flammable
- Safety data sheet (SDS)
- Except where otherwise noted, data are given for materials in their standard state (at 25 °C [77 °F], 100 kPa). verify (what is ?) Infobox references

Silver nitride is an explosive chemical compound with chemical formula Ag_{3}N. It is a black, metallic-looking solid which is formed when silver oxide or silver nitrate is dissolved in concentrated solutions of ammonia, causing formation of the diammine silver complex which subsequently breaks down to Ag_{3}N. The standard free energy of the compound is about +315 kJ/mol, making it an endothermic compound which decomposes explosively to metallic silver and nitrogen gas.

== Properties ==
Silver nitride is poorly soluble in water, but decomposes in mineral acids; decomposition is explosive in concentrated acids. It also slowly decomposes in air at room temperature and explodes upon heating to 165 °C.

== History ==
Silver nitride was formerly referred to as fulminating silver, but this can cause confusion with silver fulminate or silver azide, other compounds which have also been referred to by this name. The fulminate and azide compounds do not form from ammoniacal solutions of Ag_{2}O. Fulminating silver was first prepared in 1788 by the French chemist Claude Louis Berthollet. 70 years earlier, in 1716 Johann Kunckel von Löwenstern had already described the preparation.

== Hazards ==
Silver nitride is often produced inadvertently during experiments involving silver compounds and ammonia, leading to surprise detonations. Whether silver nitride is formed depends on the concentration of ammonia in the solution. Silver oxide in 1.52 M ammonia solution readily converts to the nitride, while silver oxide in 0.76 M solution does not form nitride. Silver oxide can also react with dry ammonia to form Ag_{3}N. Silver nitride is more dangerous when dry; dry silver nitride is a contact explosive which may detonate from the slightest touch, even a falling water droplet. It is also explosive when wet, although less so, and explosions do not propagate well in wet deposits of the compound. Because of its long-term instability, undetonated deposits of Ag_{3}N will lose their sensitivity over time.

Silver nitride may appear as black crystals, grains, crusts, or mirrorlike deposits on container walls. Suspected deposits may be dissolved by adding dilute ammonia or concentrated ammonium carbonate solution, removing the explosion hazard.

== Other uses of the term ==
The name "silver nitride" is sometimes also used to describe a reflective coating consisting of alternating thin layers of silver metal and silicon nitride. This material is not explosive, and is not a true silver nitride. It is used to coat mirrors and shotguns.

== High-pressure silver pentazolate ==
While Ag_{3}N is thermodynamically metastable at ambient conditions, a thermodynamically stable silver nitride was first synthesized in 2025 by reacting elemental silver directly with molecular nitrogen at a pressure of 118 GPa and a temperature above 2000 K in a laser-heated diamond anvil cell. The resulting compound, silver pentazolate (AgN_{5}), was found by single-crystal X-ray diffraction to be built from planar aromatic cyclo-N_{5}^{−} pentazolate rings, distinct in structure from previously predicted silver nitrides. Density functional theory calculations showed AgN_{5} to be the only thermodynamically stable Ag–N solid over the pressure range of 10–120 GPa, with a direct electronic band gap of approximately 1.2 eV. Upon decompression, the compound remained stable down to between 55 and 33 GPa, below which it reverted to elemental silver and nitrogen.

== See also ==
- Silver azide
