= Edward Charles Howard =

British chemist

Edward Charles Howard FRS
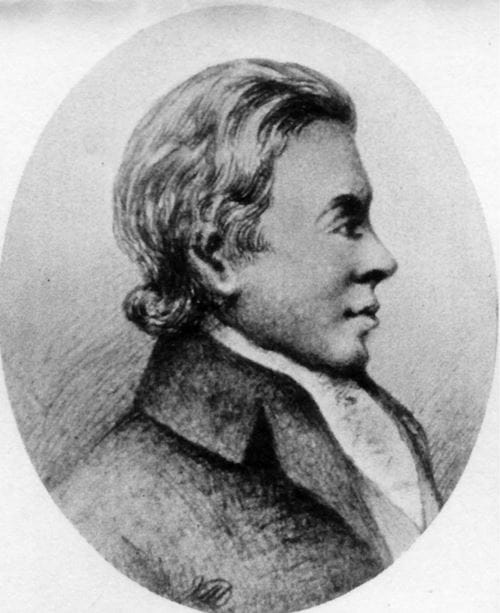
- Edward Charles Howard
- Born: 28 May 1774
- Died: 28 September 1816 (aged 42)
- Occupation: Chemist
- Known for: "The first chemical engineer of any eminence"
- Notable work: Analysis of the composition of iron meteorites
- Awards: Copley medal for his work on mercury (1800); Howardite

Edward Charles Howard FRS (28 May 1774 – 28 September 1816) the youngest brother of Bernard Howard, 12th Duke of Norfolk, was a British chemist who has been described as "the first chemical engineer of any eminence."

== Career ==
In January 1799 he was elected a Fellow of the Royal Society and in 1800 awarded their Copley medal for his work on mercury. He discovered mercury fulminate, a powerful primary explosive. In 1813 he invented a method of refining sugar which involved boiling the cane juice not in an open kettle, but in a closed vessel heated by steam and held under partial vacuum. At reduced pressure, water boils at a lower temperature, and so Howard's development both saved fuel and reduced the amount of sugar lost through caramelisation. The invention, known as Howard's vacuum pan, is still in use.

Howard also was interested in the composition of meteorites especially those of "natural iron". He found that many of these contained an alloy of nickel and iron that was not found on Earth, and thus might have fallen from the sky. One type of meteorite is now known as Howardite.

== Personal life ==
Howard married Elizabeth Maycock, a daughter of William Maycock, and they had two daughters, Elizabeth (died 1835) and Julia Barbara (died 1856), and one son, Edward Gyles Howard (1805–1840). Their son was the father of Edward Henry, Cardinal Howard (1829–1892). Their daughter Julia married Henry Stafford-Jerningham, 9th Baron Stafford, but did not have children.

== See also ==
- Glossary of meteoritics
