= Cyanate =

Anion with formula OCN and charge –1

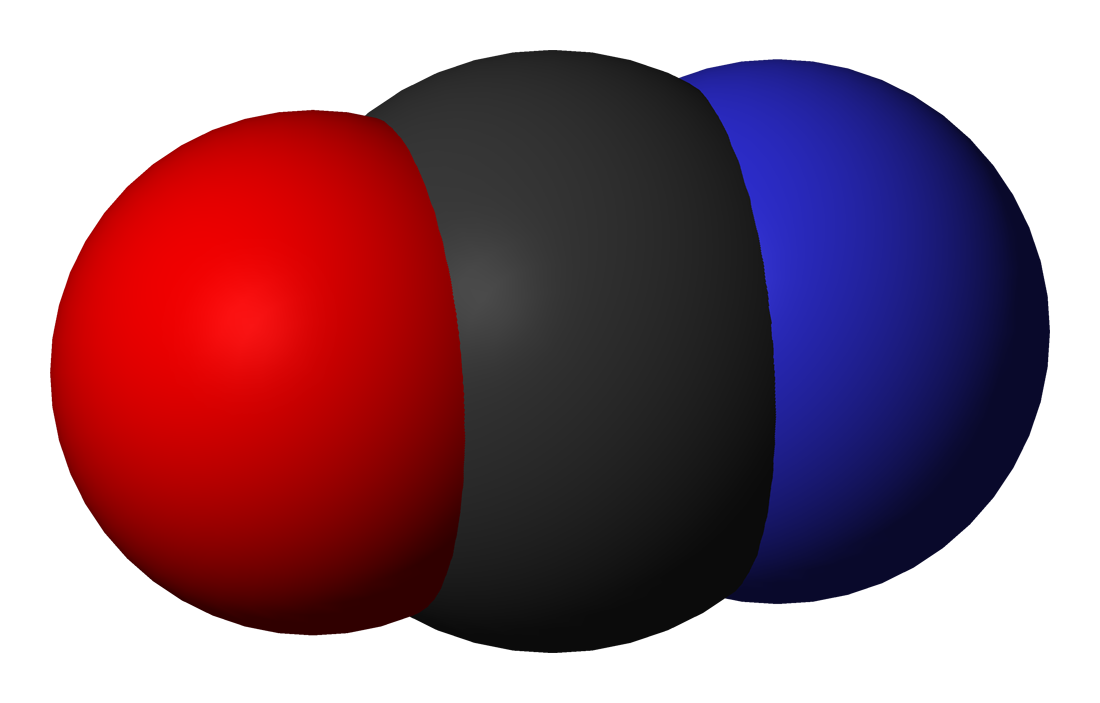
Space-filling model of the cyanate anion

The cyanate ion is an anion with the chemical formula OCN^{−}. It is a resonance of three forms: [O^{−}−C≡N] (61%) ↔ [O=C=N^{−}] (30%) ↔ [O^{+}≡C−N^{2−}] (4%).

Cyanate is the derived anion of isocyanic acid, H−N=C=O, and its lesser tautomer cyanic acid (a.k.a. cyanol), H−O−C≡N.

Any salt containing the ion, such as ammonium cyanate, is called a cyanate.

The cyanate ion is an isomer of the much-less-stable fulminate anion, CNO^{−} or [C^{−}≡N^{+}−O^{−}].

The cyanate ion is an ambidentate ligand, forming complexes with a metal ion in which either the nitrogen or oxygen atom may be the electron-pair donor. It can also act as a bridging ligand.

Compounds that contain the cyanate functional group, −O−C≡N, are known as cyanates or cyanate esters. The cyanate functional group is distinct from the isocyanate functional group, −N=C=O; the fulminate functional group, −O−N^{+}≡C^{−}; and the nitrile oxide functional group, −CNO or −C≡N^{+}−O^{−}.

== Cyanate ion ==
The three atoms in a cyanate ion lie on a straight line, giving the ion a linear structure. The electronic structure is described most simply as

:Ö̤−C≡N:

with a single C−O bond and a triple C≡N bond. (Or more completely as :Ö̤−C≡N: ↔ Ö̤=C=N̤̈ ↔ :O≡C−N̤̈:) The infrared spectrum of a cyanate salt has a band at ca. 2096 cm^{−1}; such a high frequency is characteristic of a triple bond.

The cyanate ion is a Lewis base. Both the oxygen and nitrogen atoms carry a lone pair of electrons and either one, the other, or both can be donated to Lewis acid acceptors. It can be described as an ambidentate ligand.

== Cyanate salts ==
Sodium cyanate is isostructural with sodium fulminate, confirming the linear structure of the cyanate ion. It is made industrially by heating a mixture of sodium carbonate and urea.

Na_{2}CO_{3} + 2 OC(NH_{2})_{2} → 2 NaNCO + CO_{2} + 2 NH_{3} + H_{2}O

A similar reaction is used to make potassium cyanate. Cyanates are produced when cyanides are oxidized. Use of this fact is made in cyanide decontamination processes where oxidants such as permanganate and hydrogen peroxide are used to convert toxic cyanide into less-toxic cyanate.

Name	formula	Crystal system	Space group	Unit cell (Å)	volume (Å^{3})	Density (g/cm^{3})	Comment	Reference
Ammonium cyanate	NH_{4}OCN	tetragonal	P4/nmm	a=5.082 b=5.082 c=5.551			decomposes when heated to urea	
Lithium cyanate	LiOCN	trigonal	R3̅m	a = 3.230 b = 14.268 Z=3	128.90	1.895	melts at 475 °C	
Sodium cyanate	NaOCN	hexagonal	R3̅m	a = 3.568 c = 15.123	166.72	1.94	melts at 550 °C	
Potassium cyanate	KOCN	tetragonal	I4/mcm	a = 6.091 c = 7.052	261.6	2.056	melts at 315 °C	
Rubidium cyanate	RbOCN	tetragonal	I4/mcm	a = 6.35 c = 7.38	297.58	2.85		
Cesium cyanate	CsOCN	tetragonal	I4mcm	a = 6.519 c = 7.994	339.68	3.42		
Thallium cyanate	TlOCN	tetragonal	I4mcm	a = 6.23 c = 7.32	284.3	5.76		
Silver cyanate	AgOCN	monoclinic	P2_{1}/m	a = 5.474 b = 6.378 c = 3.417 β = 90.931°	119.29	4.173	melts at 652 °C	
Strontium cyanate	Sr(OCN)_{2}	orthorhombic	Fddd	a = 6.151 b = 11.268 c = 11.848 Z = 8	821.1	2.78		

== Complexes with the cyanate ion ==
Cyanate is an ambidentate ligand which can donate the pair of electrons on the nitrogen atom or the oxygen atom, or both. Structurally the isomers can be distinguished by the geometry of the complex. In N-bonded cyanate complexes the M−NCO unit sometimes has a linear structure, but with O-bonded cyanate the M−O−C unit is bent. Thus, the silver cyanato complex, [Ag(NCO)_{2}]^{−}, has a linear structure as shown by X-ray crystallography. However, the crystal structure of silver cyanate shows zigzag chains of nitrogen atoms and silver atoms. There also exists a structure

   NCO
  /   \
Ni    Ni
  \   /
   OCN

in which the Ni-N-C group is bent.

Infrared spectroscopy has been used extensively to distinguish between isomers. Many complexes of divalent metals are N-bonded. O-Bonding has been suggested for complexes of the type [M(OCN)_{6}]^{n−}, M = Mo(III), Re(IV), and Re(V). The yellow complex Rh(PPh_{3})_{3}(NCO) and orange complex Rh(PPh_{3})_{3}(OCN) are linkage isomers and show differences in their infrared spectra which can be used for diagnosis.

The cyanate ion can bridge between two metal atoms by using both its donor atoms. For example, this structure is found in the compound [Ni_{2}(NCO)_{2}(En)_{2}](BPh_{4})_{2}. In this compound both the Ni−N−C unit and Ni−O−C unit are bent, even though in the first case donation is through the nitrogen atom.

== Cyanate functional group ==
Compounds that contain the cyanate functional group, −O−C≡N, are known as cyanates or cyanate esters. Aryl cyanates such are phenyl cyanate, C_{6}H_{5}OCN can be formed by a reaction of phenol with cyanogen chloride, ClCN, in the presence of a base.

Organic compounds that contain the isocyanate functional group −N=C=O are known as isocyanates. It is conventional in organic chemistry to write isocyanates with two double bonds, which accords with a simplistic valence bond theory of the bonding. In nucleophilic substitution reactions cyanate usually forms an isocyanate. Isocyanates are widely used in the manufacture of polyurethane products and pesticides; methyl isocyanate, used to make pesticides, was a major factor in the Bhopal disaster.

== See also ==
- Cyanide, CN^{−} and nitrile group, −C≡N
- Isocyanide or isonitrile group, −N≡C
- Thiocyanate, SCN^{−}, −S−C≡N
- Selenocyanate, SeCN^{−}, −Se−C≡N
- Tellurocyanate, TeCN^{−}, −Te−C≡N
- Isocyanate group, −N=C=O
- Isothiocyanate group, −N=C=S
- Isoselenocyanate group, −N=C=Se

== Bibliography ==
- Greenwood, Norman N.; Earnshaw, Alan (1997). Chemistry of the Elements (2nd ed.). Butterworth-Heinemann. doi:10.1016/C2009-0-30414-6. ISBN 978-0-08-037941-8.
- Nakamoto, K. (1997). Infrared and Raman spectra of Inorganic and Coordination compounds. Part A (5th ed.). Wiley. ISBN 0-471-16394-5.
- Nakamoto, K. (1997). Infrared and Raman spectra of Inorganic and Coordination compounds. Part B (5th ed.). Wiley. ISBN 0-471-16392-9.
- Wells, A.F (1962). Structural Inorganic Chemistry (3rd. ed.). Oxford: Clarendon Press. ISBN 0-19-855125-8.
