= Potassium cyanate =

- $\ce{\mathsf{K+\ \ ^-N=C=O}}$
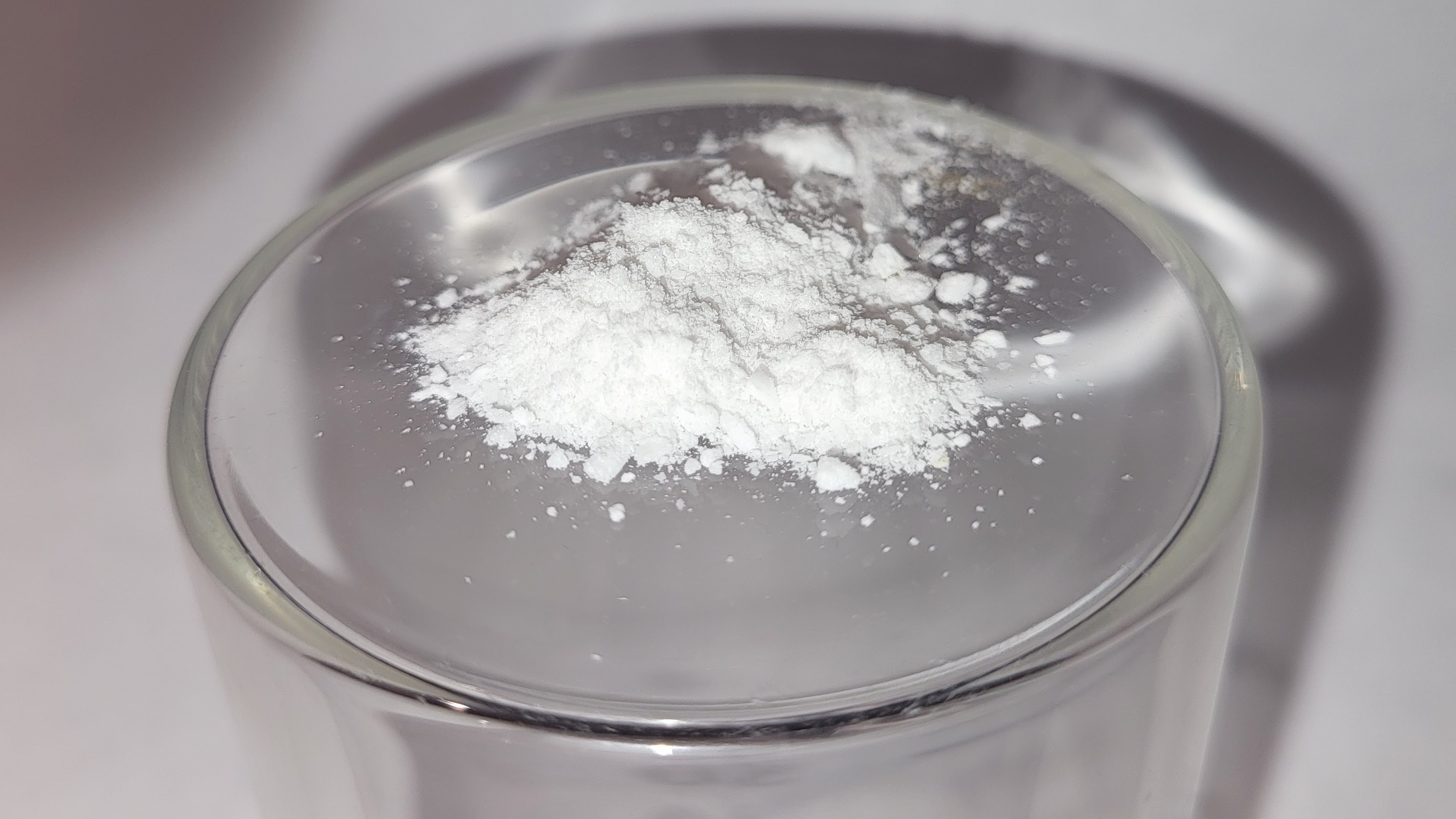

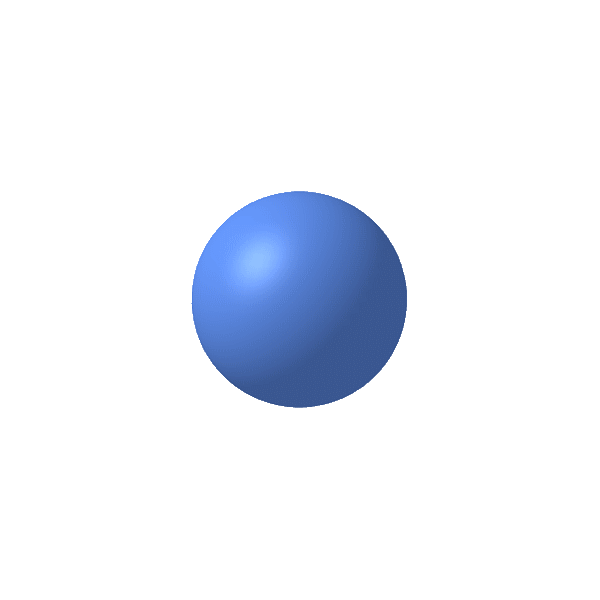

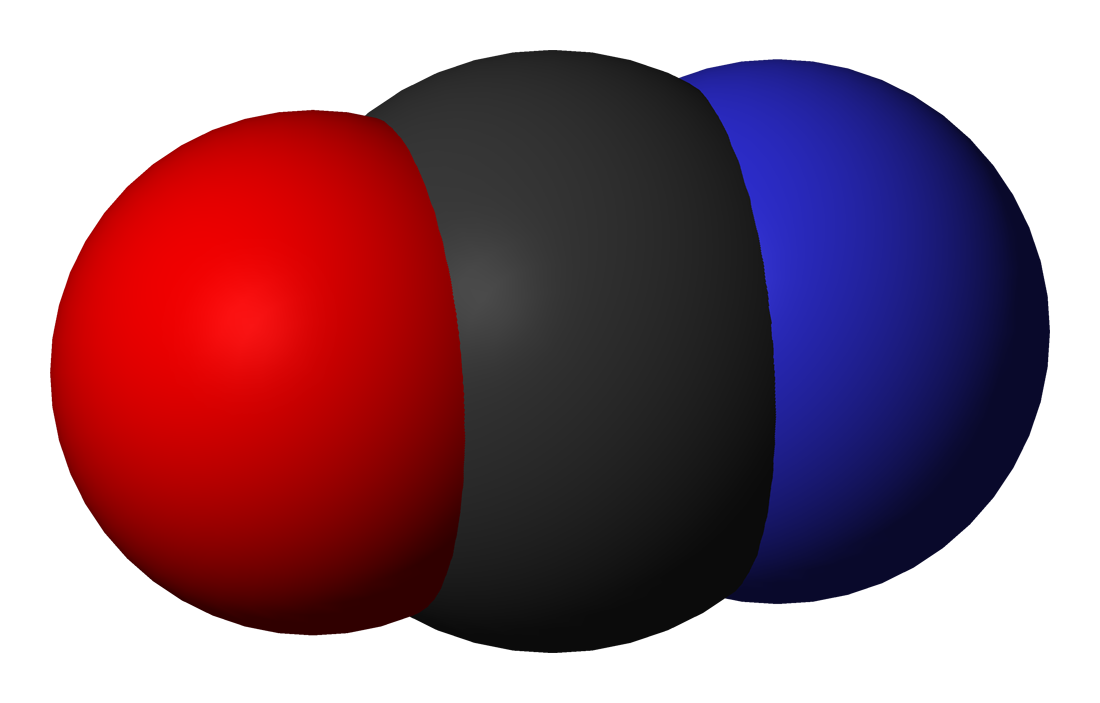

Names
- IUPAC name Potassium cyanate

Identifiers
CAS Number	590-28-3
3D model (JSmol)	Interactive image
Beilstein Reference	3560091
ChEBI	CHEBI:38904
ChEMBL	ChEMBL4079232
ChemSpider	11053
ECHA InfoCard	100.008.798
EC Number	209-676-3
Gmelin Reference	21361
KEGG	C19067
PubChem CID	11378442
RTECS number	GS6825000
UNII	G9C31TWN5M
CompTox Dashboard (EPA)	DTXSID2047692
- InChI: InChI=1S/CHNO.K/c2-1-3;/h3H;/q;+1/p-1 Key: GKKCIDNWFBPDBW-UHFFFAOYSA-M; InChI=1/CHNO.K/c2-1-3;/h3H;/q;+1/p-1 Key: GKKCIDNWFBPDBW-REWHXWOFAI
- SMILES: C(#N)[O-].[K+]

Properties
Chemical formula	KOCN
Molar mass	81.1151 g/mol
Appearance	white, crystalline powder
Density	2.056 g/cm^{3}
Melting point	315 °C (599 °F; 588 K)
Boiling point	~ 700 °C (1,292 °F; 973 K) decomposes
Solubility in water	75 g/100 mL
Solubility	very slightly soluble in alcohol

Structure
Crystal structure	tetragonal

Hazards
- GHS labelling
Pictograms	(GHS07: Exclamation mark)
Signal word	Warning
Hazard statements	H302
Precautionary statements	P264, P270, P301+P312, P330, P501
NFPA 704 (fire diamond)	2 0 0
- Lethal dose or concentration (LD, LC)
LD_{50} (median dose)	841 mg/kg (oral, rat)
- Except where otherwise noted, data are given for materials in their standard state (at 25 °C [77 °F], 100 kPa). verify (what is ?) Infobox references

Potassium cyanate is an inorganic compound with the formula KOCN (sometimes denoted KCNO). It is a colourless solid. It is used to prepare many other compounds including useful herbicide. Worldwide production of the potassium and sodium salts was 20,000 tons in 2006.

== Structure and bonding ==
The cyanate anion is isoelectronic with carbon dioxide and with the azide anion, being linear. The C-N distance is 121 pm, about 5 pm longer than for cyanide. Potassium cyanate is isostructural with potassium azide.

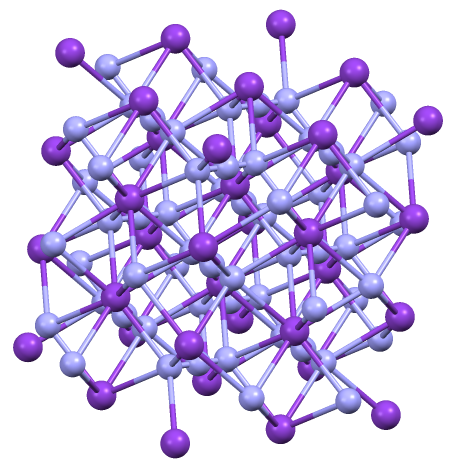
Structure of potassium azide, which is isostructural with potassium cyanate.

== Uses ==
The potassium and sodium salts can be used interchangeably for the majority of applications. Potassium cyanate is often preferred to the sodium salt, which is less soluble in water and less readily available in pure form.

Potassium cyanate is used as a basic raw material for various organic syntheses, including, urea derivatives, semicarbazides, carbamates and isocyanates. For example, it is used to prepare the drug hydroxyurea. It is also used for the heat treatment of metals (e.g., Ferritic nitrocarburizing).

=== Therapeutic uses ===
Potassium cyanate was investigated as a treatment for sickle cell anemia, because it carbamylates the lysines and terminal amine in deformed hemoglobin, modifying those areas' hydrophobicity. It has similarly been proposed to treat veterinary malaria.

== Preparation and reactions ==
Commercial KOCN is prepared by heating urea with potassium carbonate at 400 °C:

2 OC(NH_{2})_{2} + K_{2}CO_{3} → 2 KOCN + (NH_{4})_{2}CO_{3}

The reaction produces a liquid. Intermediates and impurities include biuret, cyanuric acid, and potassium allophanate (KO_{2}CNHC(O)NH_{2}), as well as unreacted starting urea, but these species are unstable at 400 °C.

Potassium cyanate is also formed by the oxidation of potassium cyanide, either with oxidizing agents or at high temperature in air.

Protonation gives a 97:3 mixture (at room temperature) of two tautomers, HNCO (isocyanic acid) and NCOH (cyanic acid). This mixture is stable at high dilution but trimerizes on concentration to give cyanuric acid.
