= Isocyanic acid =

Chemical compound (H–N=C=O)

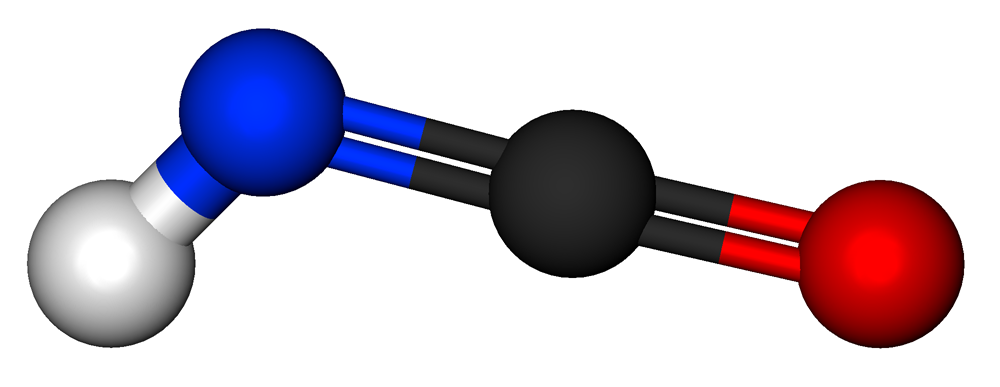

Names
- IUPAC name Isocyanic acid
- Other names Carbimide; Carbonic imide

Identifiers
| CAS Number | 75-13-8; 420-05-3 (cyanic acid) |
| 3D model (JSmol) | Isocyanic acid: Interactive image; Cyanic acid: Interactive image |
| ChEBI | CHEBI:29202 |
| ChemSpider | 6107 |
| ECHA InfoCard | 100.109.068 |
| PubChem CID | 6347 |
| UNII | QKG6U31925; 460E3FHT8O (cyanic acid) |
| CompTox Dashboard (EPA) | DTXSID9073884 |
- InChI: InChI=1S/CHNO/c2-1-3/h2H Key: OWIKHYCFFJSOEH-UHFFFAOYSA-N; InChI=1/CHNO/c2-1-3/h2H Key: OWIKHYCFFJSOEH-UHFFFAOYAE
- SMILES: Isocyanic acid: O=C=N; Cyanic acid: OC#N

Properties
| Chemical formula | HNCO |
| Molar mass | 43.025 g·mol^{−1} |
| Appearance | Colorless gas (condenses near room temperature) |
| Density | 1.14 g/cm^{3} |
| Melting point | −86 °C (−123 °F; 187 K); Polymerizes to solid −20 °C (−4 °F; 253 K) |
| Boiling point | 23.5 °C (74.3 °F; 296.6 K) (extrapolated) |
| Solubility in water | Dissolves; polymerizes if concentrated |
| Solubility | Soluble in benzene, toluene, diethyl ether |
| Acidity (pK_{a}) | 3.7 |
| Conjugate acid | Oxomethaniminium |
| Conjugate base | Cyanate |

Hazards
- Occupational safety and health (OHS/OSH)
| Main hazards | Poisonous |
- Except where otherwise noted, data are given for materials in their standard state (at 25 °C [77 °F], 100 kPa). verify (what is ?) Infobox references

Isocyanic acid is a chemical compound with the structural formula HNCO, which is often written as H−N=C=O. It is a colourless, volatile and poisonous gas, condensing at 23.5 °C. It is the predominant tautomer and an isomer of cyanic acid (aka. cyanol) (H−O−C≡N), and the monomer of cyanuric acid.

The derived anion of isocyanic acid is the same as the derived anion of cyanic acid, and that anion is [N=C=O]^{−}, which is called cyanate. The related functional group −N=C=O is isocyanate; it is distinct from cyanate (−O−C≡N), fulminate (−O−N^{+}≡C^{−}), and nitrile oxide (−C≡N^{+}−O^{−}).

Isocyanic acid was discovered in 1830 by Justus von Liebig and Friedrich Wöhler.

Isocyanic acid is the simplest stable chemical compound that contains carbon, hydrogen, nitrogen, and oxygen, the four most commonly found elements in organic chemistry and biology. It is the only fairly stable one of the four linear isomers with molecular formula HOCN that have been synthesized, the others being cyanic acid (cyanol, H−O−C≡N) and the elusive fulminic acid (H−C≡N^{+}−O^{−}) and isofulminic acid H−O−N^{+}≡C^{−}.

== Structure ==
=== Isocyanic acid (HNCO) ===
Although the electronic structure according to valence bond theory can be written as H−N=C=O, the vibrational spectrum has a band at 2268.8 cm^{−1} in the gas phase, which some say indicates a carbon–nitrogen triple bond. If so, then the canonical form H−N^{+}≡C−O^{−} is the major resonance structure.

However, classic vibrational analysis would indicate that the 2268.8 cm^{−1} is the asymmetric N=C=O stretch, as per Colthup et al., as well as the NIST Chemistry WebBook, which also reports the corresponding symmetric N=C=O stretch (weak in infrared, but strong in Raman) to be 1327 cm^{−1}. Based on these classic assignments, there is no need to invoke a full charged state for the N and O atoms, to explain the vibrational spectral data.

=== Cyanic acid (HOCN) ===
The tautomer, known as cyanic acid, HOCN, in which the oxygen atom is protonated exists in equilibrium with isocyanic acid to the extent of about 3%. The vibrational spectrum is indicative of the presence of a triple bond between the nitrogen and carbon atoms.

== Properties ==
In aqueous solution it is a weak acid, having a pK_{a} of 3.7:

HNCO ⇌ H^{+} + NCO^{−}

Isocyanic acid hydrolyses to carbon dioxide and ammonia:

HNCO + H_{2}O → CO_{2} + NH_{3}

Dilute solutions of isocyanic acid are stable in inert solvents, e.g. ether and chlorinated hydrocarbons.

At high concentrations, isocyanic acid oligomerizes to give the trimer cyanuric acid and cyamelide, a polymer. These species usually are easily separated from liquid- or gas-phase reaction products.

Isocyanic acid reacts with amines to give ureas (carbamides):

HNCO + RNH_{2} → RNHC(O)NH_{2}

This reaction is called carbamylation. Excess isocyanic acid can react with the ureas to give allophanates.

HNCO adds across electron-rich double bonds, such as vinylethers, to give the corresponding isocyanates.

Isocyanic acid, HNCO, is a Lewis acid whose free energy, enthalpy and entropy changes for its 1:1 association with a number of bases in carbon tetrachloride solution at 25 °C have been reported. The acceptor properties of HNCO are compared with other Lewis acid in the ECW model.

Low-temperature photolysis of solids containing HNCO creates the tautomer cyanic acid H−O−C≡N, also called hydrogen cyanate. Pure cyanic acid has not been isolated, and isocyanic acid is the predominant form in all solvents. Sometimes information presented for cyanic acid in reference books is actually for isocyanic acid.

== Preparation ==
Isocyanic acid can be made by protonation of the cyanate anion, such as from salts like potassium cyanate, by either gaseous hydrogen chloride or acids such as oxalic acid.

H^{+} + NCO^{−} → HNCO

HNCO also can be made by the high-temperature thermal decomposition of the trimer cyanuric acid:

C_{3}H_{3}N_{3}O_{3} → 3 HNCO

In all cases the resulting acid must be kept very cold or in gaseous form, as concentrated isocyanic acid polymerizes rapidly above −20 °C.

In the reverse of the famous synthesis of urea by Friedrich Wöhler,

CO(NH_{2})_{2} → HNCO + NH_{3}

isocyanic acid is produced and rapidly trimerizes to cyanuric acid.

== Occurrence ==
Isocyanic acid has been detected in many kinds of interstellar environments.

Isocyanic acid is also present in various forms of smoke, including smog and cigarette smoke. It was detected using mass spectrometry, and easily dissolves in water, posing a health risk to the lungs.

== See also ==
- Cyanate
- Thiocyanic acid
