= Fulminic acid =

Chemical compound (H–C≡N–O)

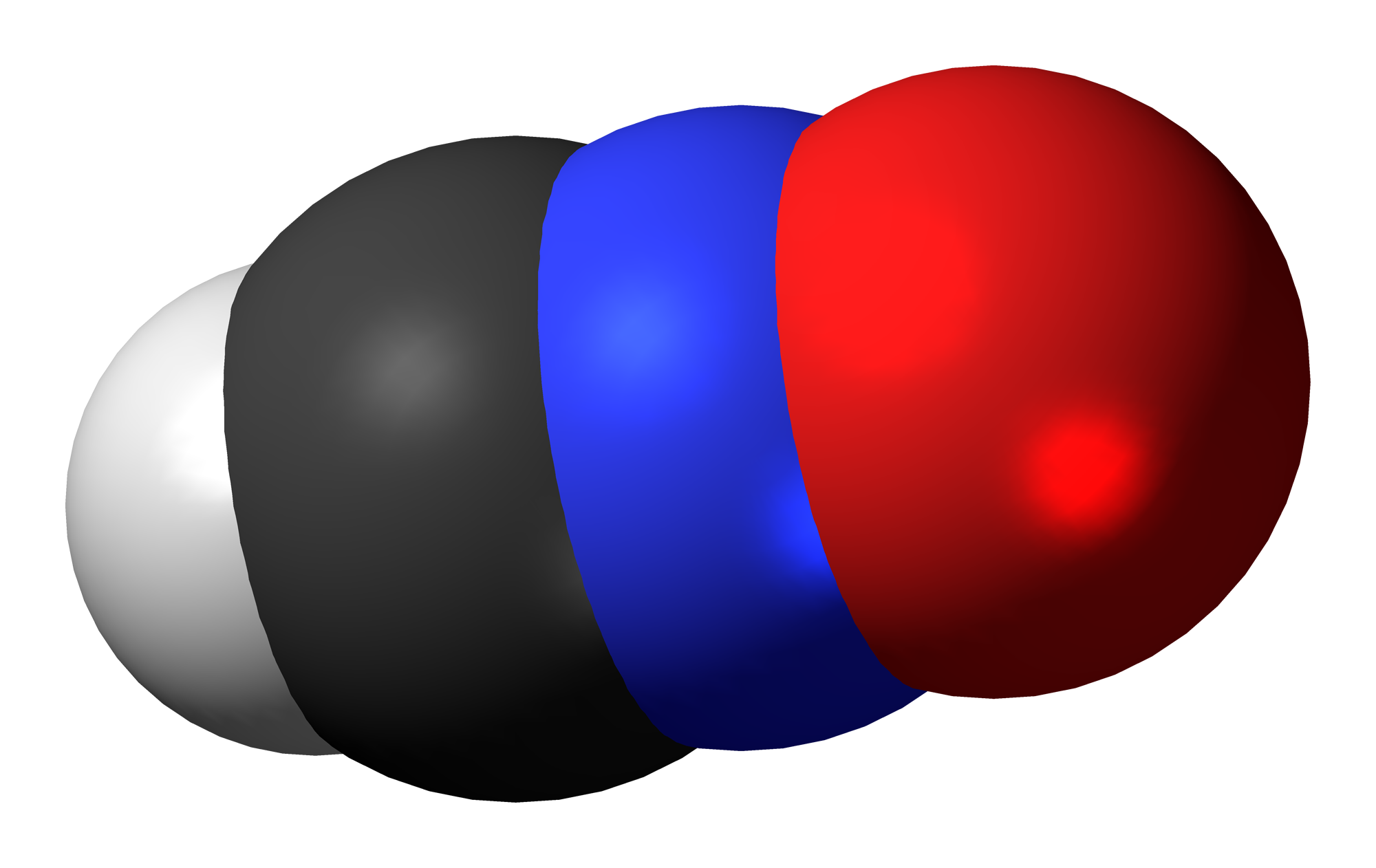

Names
- IUPAC name Oxidoazaniumylidynemethane

Identifiers
CAS Number	506-85-4
3D model (JSmol)	Interactive image
Beilstein Reference	1071209
ChEBI	CHEBI:29813
ChEMBL	ChEMBL185198
ChemSpider	454715
Gmelin Reference	772
PubChem CID	521293
CompTox Dashboard (EPA)	DTXSID30334603
- InChI: InChI=1S/CHNO/c1-2-3/h1H Key: UXKUODQYLDZXDL-UHFFFAOYSA-N; InChI=1/CHNO/c1-2-3/h1H Key: UXKUODQYLDZXDL-UHFFFAOYAL
- SMILES: [O-][N+]#C

Properties
Chemical formula	HCNO
Molar mass	43.02 g mol^{−1}
Conjugate base	Fulminate
- Except where otherwise noted, data are given for materials in their standard state (at 25 °C [77 °F], 100 kPa). verify (what is ?) Infobox references

Fulminic acid is an acid with the formula HCNO, more specifically H−C≡N^{+}−O^{−}. It is an isomer of isocyanic acid (H−N=C=O) and of its elusive tautomer, cyanic acid (H−O−C≡N), and also of isofulminic acid (H−O−N^{+}≡C^{−}).

Fulminate is the anion [C^{−}≡N^{+}−O^{−}] of any of its salts. For historical reasons, the fulminate functional group is understood to be −O−N^{+}≡C^{−} as in isofulminic acid; whereas the group −C≡N^{+}O^{−} is called nitrile oxide.

== History ==
This chemical was known since the early 1800s through its salts and via the products of reactions in which it was proposed to exist, but the acid itself was not detected until 1966.

== Structure ==
Fulminic acid was long believed to have a structure of H–O–N^{+}≡C^{−}. It wasn't until the 1966 isolation and analysis of a pure sample of fulminic acid that this structural idea was conclusively disproven. The chemical that actually has that structure, isofulminic acid (a tautomer of the actual fulminic acid structure) was eventually detected in 1988.

A 1967 microwave spectroscopy study described fulminic acid as linear, with the following bond-lengths: C–H: 1.027(1) Å, C–N: 1.161(15) Å, N–O: 1.207(15) Å. This predicted C–H bond length is unusually short, likely an artifact of the linear fit. The molecule has a very low barrier to H–C–N bond angle flexion, making it difficult to ascertain whether its ground state is linear or slightly bent. It has variously been described as quasilinear (minimum-energy bent but with a sufficiently low barrier to linearization that its rovibrational spectrum has characteristics similar to that of a linear molecule) and quasibent (minimum-energy linear but with a sufficiently low barrier to bending that zero-point fluctuations yield a rovibrational spectrum with characteristics similar to that of a bent molecule). Accurately modeling its structure using quantum chemical computations has proven similarly challenging.

== Synthesis ==
A convenient synthesis involves flash pyrolysis of certain oximes. In contrast to earlier syntheses, this method avoids the use of highly explosive metal fulminates.
