= Peroxydisulfate =

Ion containing sulfur and oxygen with a charge of 2-

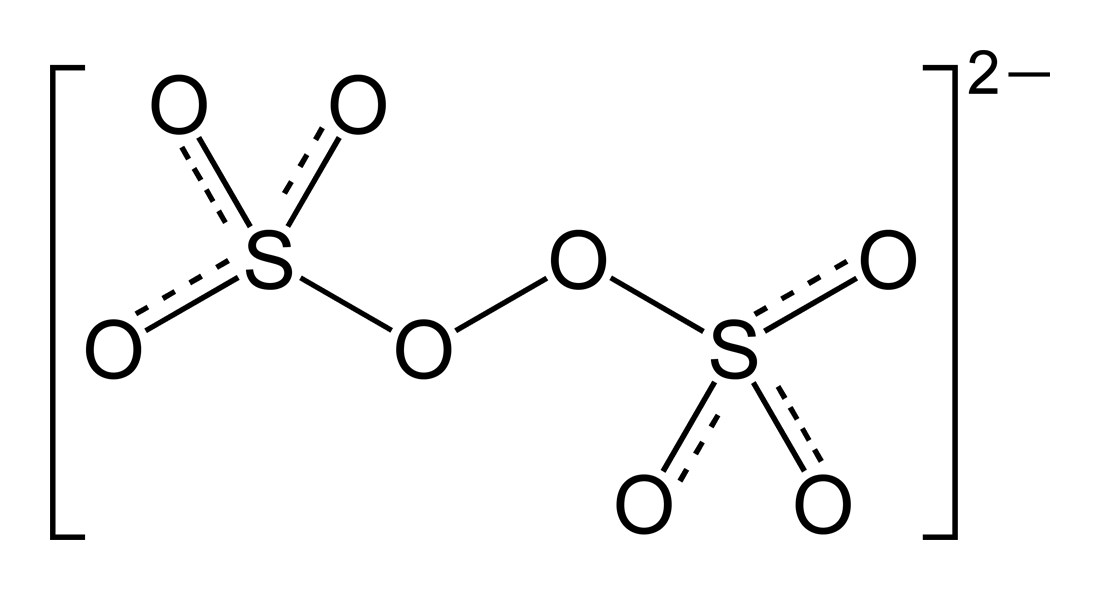

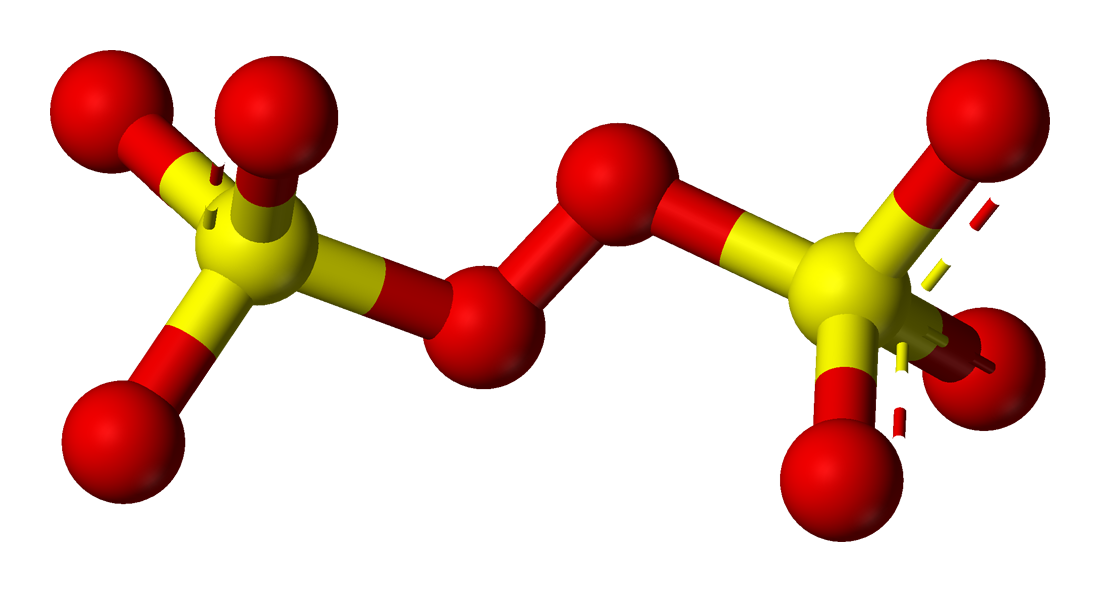

Names
- Other names: Peroxodisulfate; Persulfate

Identifiers
CAS Number	15092-81-6
3D model (JSmol)	Interactive image
ChEBI	CHEBI:29267
ChemSpider	97014
PubChem CID	107879
UNII	1SQ1481FEQ
- InChI: InChI=1S/H2O8S2/c1-9(2,3)7-8-10(4,5)6/h(H,1,2,3)(H,4,5,6)/p-2 Key: JRKICGRDRMAZLK-UHFFFAOYSA-L
- SMILES: [O-]S(=O)(=O)OOS([O-])(=O)=O

Properties
Chemical formula	O_{8}S_{2}^{−2}
Molar mass	192.11 g·mol^{−1}
Conjugate acid	Peroxydisulfuric acid
- Except where otherwise noted, data are given for materials in their standard state (at 25 °C [77 °F], 100 kPa). Infobox references

The peroxydisulfate ion, S_{2}O^{2−}_{8}, is an oxyanion, the anion of peroxydisulfuric acid. It is commonly referred to as persulfate, but this term also refers to the peroxomonosulfate ion, SO^{2−}_{5}. It is also called peroxodisulfate. Approximately 500,000 tons of salts containing this anion are produced annually. Important salts include sodium persulfate (Na_{2}S_{2}O_{8}), potassium persulfate (K_{2}S_{2}O_{8}), and ammonium persulfate ((NH_{4})_{2}S_{2}O_{8}). These salts are colourless, water-soluble solids that are strong oxidants.

== Applications ==
Salts of peroxydisulfate are mainly used to initiate the polymerization of various alkenes, including styrene, acrylonitrile, and fluoroalkenes. Polymerization is initiated by the homolysis of the peroxydisulfate:

[O_{3}SO–OSO_{3}]^{2−} ⇌ 2 [SO_{4}]^{•−}

Moreover, sodium peroxydisulfate can be used for soil and groundwater remediation, water and wastewater treatment, and etching of copper on circuit boards.

It has also been used to produce hair lighteners and bleaches, medical drugs, cellophane, rubber, soaps, detergents, adhesive papers, dyes for textiles, and in photography.

In addition to its major commercial applications, peroxydisulfate participates in reactions of interest in the laboratory:

- Elbs persulfate oxidation
- Oxidation of Ag^{+} to Ag^{2+}, such as the preparation of tetrakis(pyridine)silver(II) peroxydisulfate

== Structure ==
Peroxydisulfate is a centrosymmetric anion. The O-O distance is 1.48 Å. The sulfur centers are tetrahedral.
