= Tetrakis(pyridine)silver(II) peroxydisulfate =

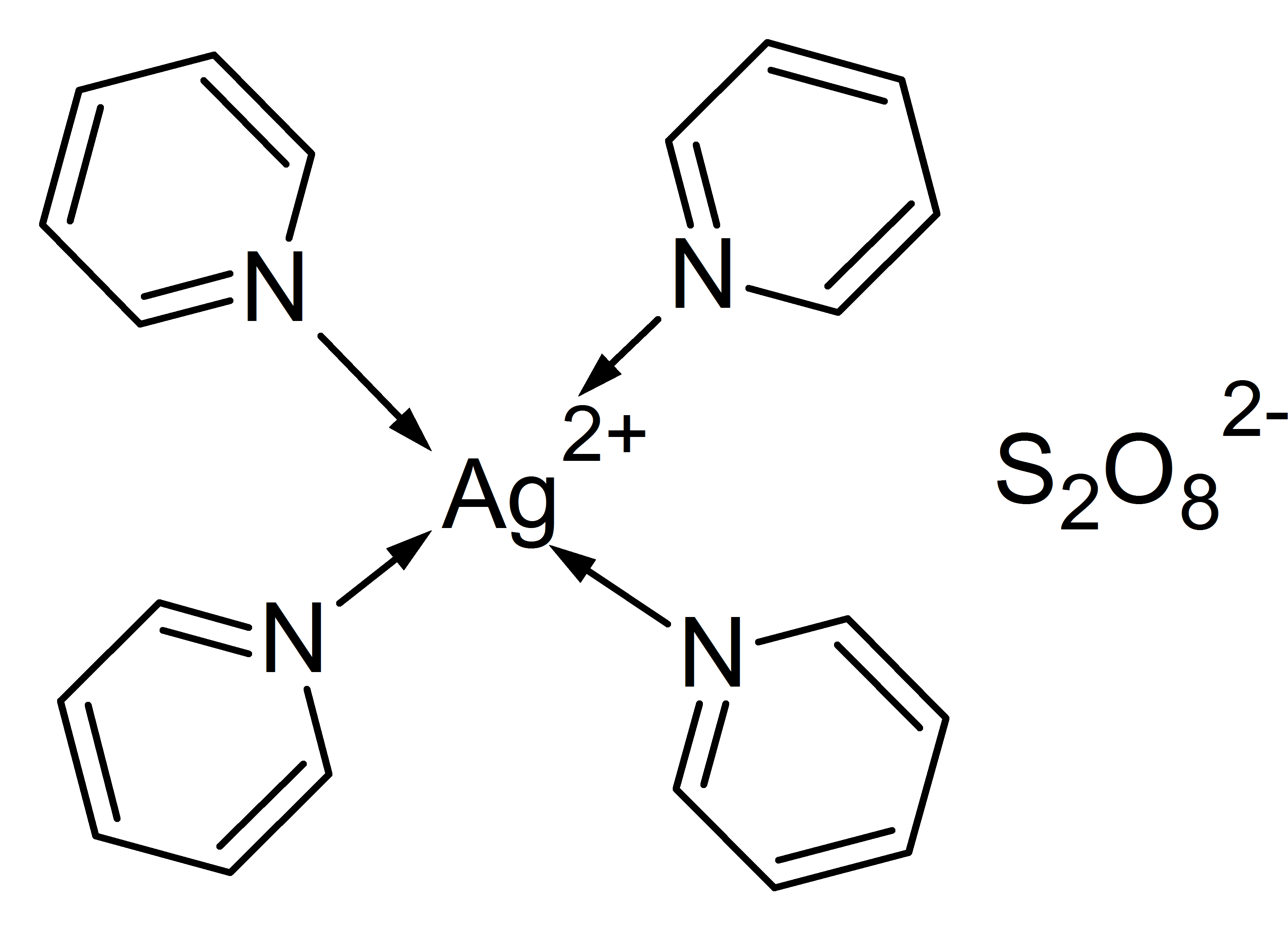

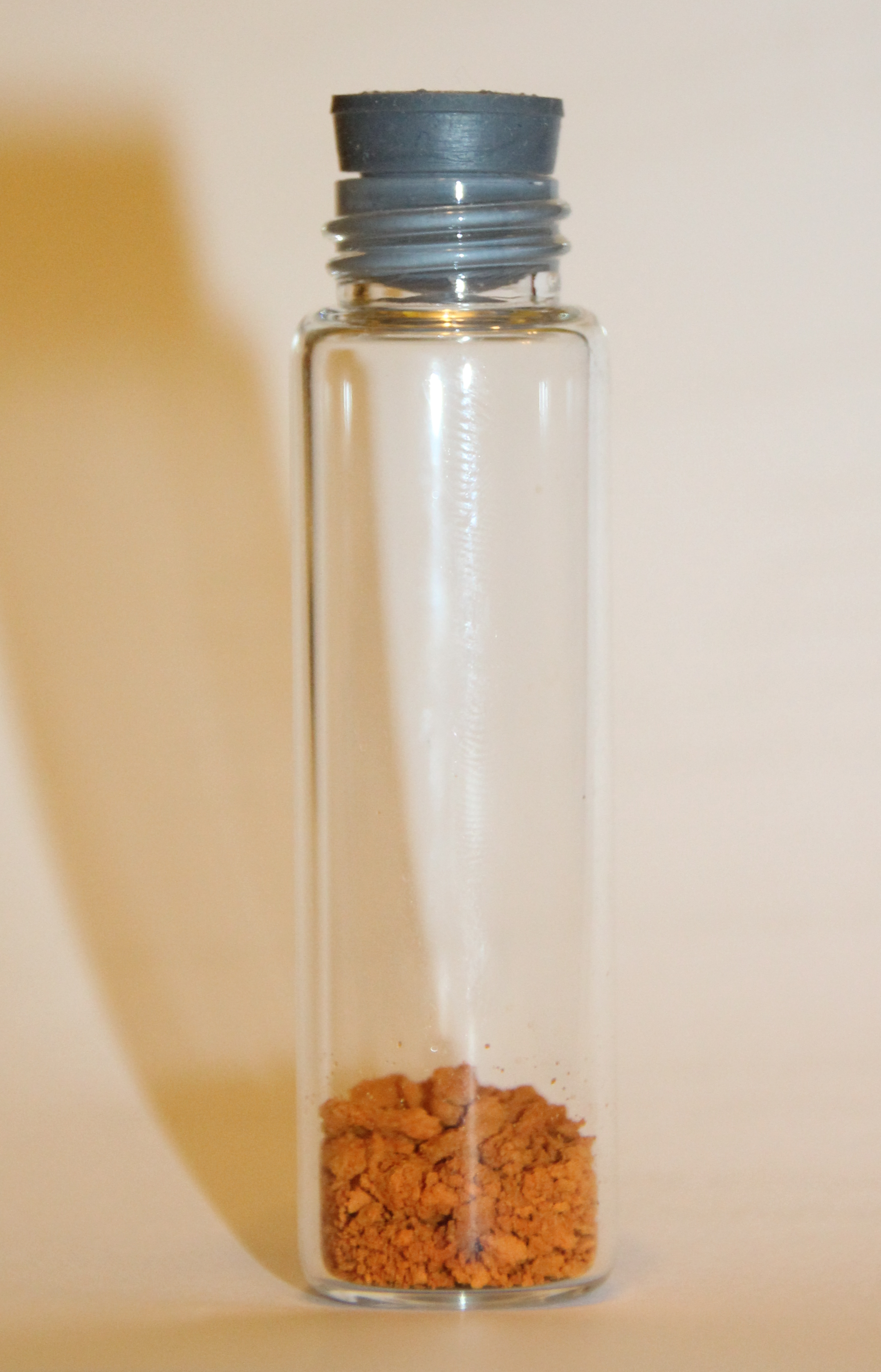

Names
- Other names Tetrakis(pyridine)silver(II) persulfate, Tetrakis(pyridine)silver(II) peroxodisulfate

Identifiers
CAS Number	15810-50-1
3D model (JSmol)	Interactive image
ChemSpider	29333956
- InChI: InChI=1S/4C5H5N.Ag.H2O8S2/c4*1-2-4-6-5-3-1;;1-9(2,3)7-8-10(4,5)6/h4*1-5H;;(H,1,2,3)(H,4,5,6)/q;;;;+2;/p-2 Key: LPADOLSGWNTMHL-UHFFFAOYSA-L
- SMILES: [Ag2+].[O-]S(=O)(=O)OOS([O-])(=O)=O.n1ccccc1.n1ccccc1.n1ccccc1.n1ccccc1

Properties
Chemical formula	C_{20}H_{20}N_{4}AgS_{2}O_{8}
Molar mass	616.39 g·mol^{−1}
Appearance	orange solid
Solubility in water	insoluble

Structure
Coordination geometry	Square planar

Hazards
Flash point	20 °C (68 °F; 293 K)
- Except where otherwise noted, data are given for materials in their standard state (at 25 °C [77 °F], 100 kPa). verify (what is ?) Infobox references

Tetrakis(pyridine)silver(II) peroxydisulfate is a chemical compound which contains silver in the rare oxidation state of +2.

== Preparation ==
The salt can be easily prepared by oxidizing a soluble silver salt with excess potassium peroxydisulfate in aqueous pyridine solution, where upon the product precipitates out almost quantitatively.

2 AgNO_{3} + 8 C_{5}H_{5}N + 3 K_{2}S_{2}O_{8} → 2 [Ag(C_{5}H_{5}N)_{4}]S_{2}O_{8} + 2 K_{2}SO_{4} + 2 KNO_{3}

== Structure ==
Since the Ag^{2+} ion has a d^{9} configuration, the salt is paramagnetic.

== Properties ==
The compound is in the form of non-hygroscopic orange granulate. It is stable in the air for several days when stored away from light, and is stable up to several months if dried in vacuo over potassium hydroxide, decomposing into a white paste. Its stability can be attributed to its insolubility in both polar and non-polar solvents.

The compound decomposes at 137 °C. It dissolves in concentrated nitric acid without reduction, and is converted to the black silver(I,III) oxide in aqueous sodium hydroxide solution.

It is a powerful oxidizing agent, and is illustrated by the fact that it oxidizes Mn^{2+} ions to permanganates. When the pyridine ligands were removed, the transient square planar [Ag(H_{2}O)_{4}]^{2+} remains, which spontaneously oxidizes water to oxygen.

Ag^{2+} + e^{−} ⇌ Ag^{+} {E° = +1.980 V}

== Applications in organic chemistry ==
The complex ion can easily oxidize alcohol, aldehyde and amine, and capable of decarboxylating α-hydroxycarboxylic acids and phenylacetic acids to give the corresponding carbonyl compounds. Benzylic C-H bonds are oxidatively converted to carbonyl groups:

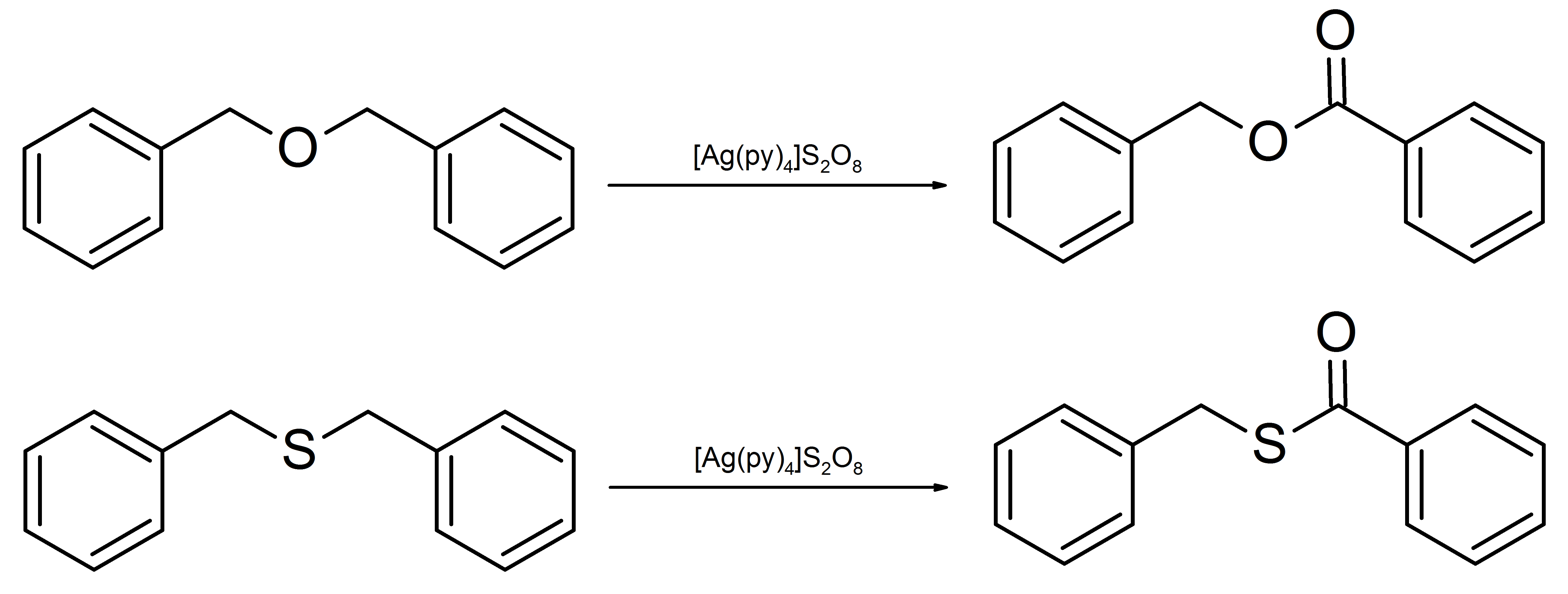

Aromatic thiols and allylaryl thioethers are oxidized to arylsulfonic acids, which gives an alternative route to produce arylsulfonic acids with mild conditions.

== Safety ==
As the compound contains the peroxydisulfate ion as the counteranion, this compound should be treated as an explosive even though its explosive properties were not well established. The complex also releases tiny amounts of pyridine vapor which is a possible carcinogen.
