= Hugh Marshall =

Scottish chemist

Professor Hugh Marshall FRS FRSE FCS

Professor of Chemistry, University College, Dundee
- In office 1908 – 5 September 1913

Personal details
- Born: 7 January 1868 Edinburgh, Scotland
- Died: 5 September 1913 (aged 45) London, England
- Occupation: Chemist

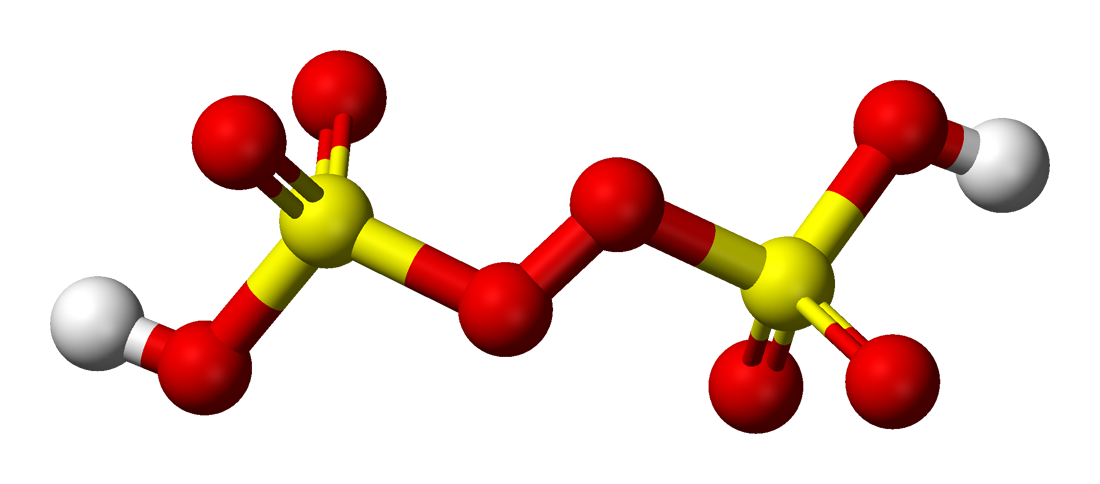
Marshall's Acid

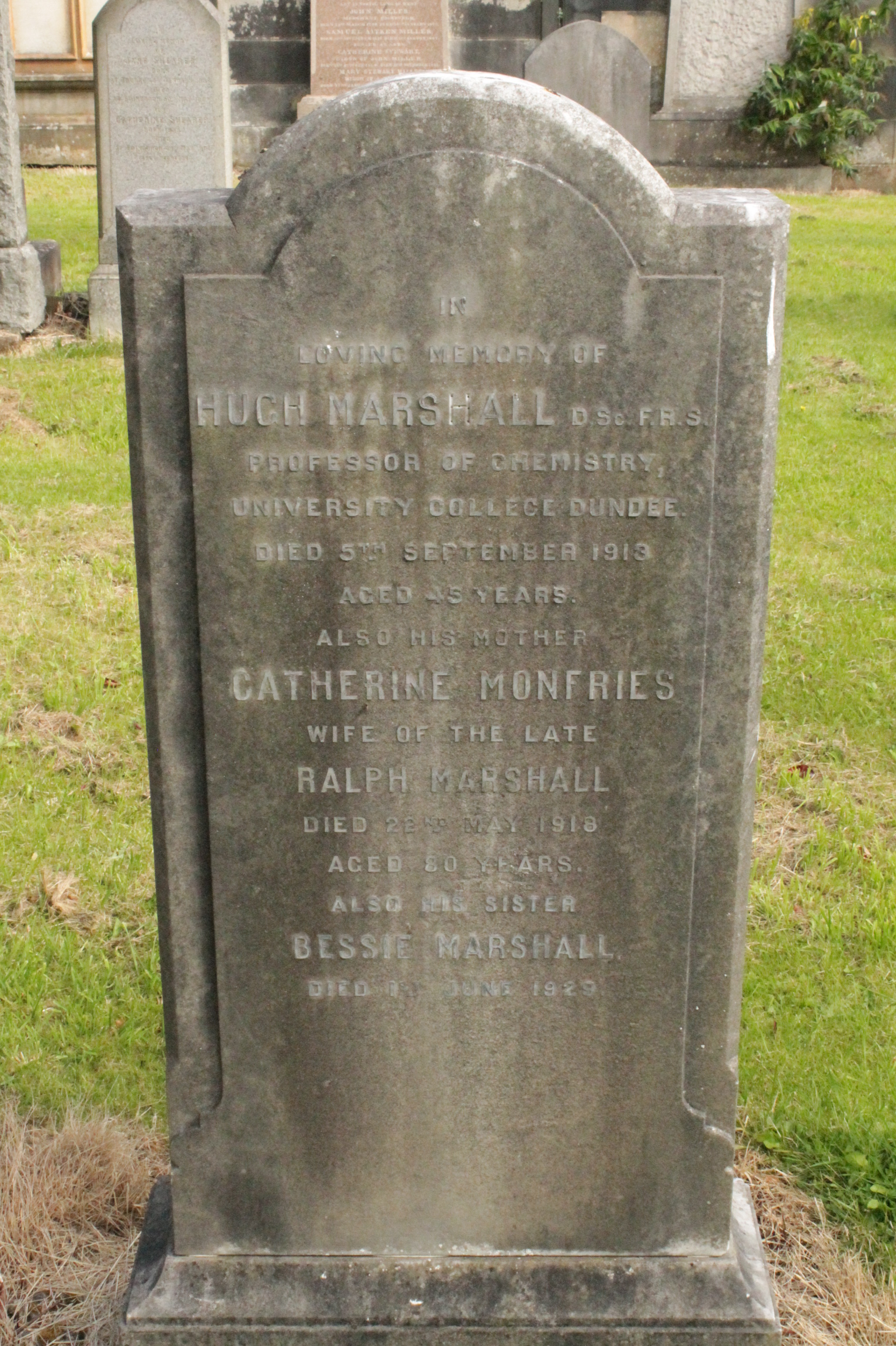
The grave of Hugh Marshall, Grange Cemetery

Hugh Marshall (7 January 1868 – 5 September 1913) was a Scottish chemist who discovered persulphates in 1891. He was the inventor of Marshall's acid. In 1902 he proposed the modified sign of equality $\ce{<=>}$ which became standard in chemistry to represent dynamic equilibrium.

== Life ==
He was born in Edinburgh on 7 January 1868 the son of Ralph Marshall and his wife Catherine Monfries.

He was educated at Moray House Normal School. He studied science at the University of Edinburgh and graduated with a BSc in 1886 and gained a doctorate (DSc) in 1888.

In 1894 he began lecturing in mineralogy and crystallography at the University of Edinburgh, changing to chemistry in 1902 and moving to Dundee University College (which was later to become the University of Dundee but was then a constituent college of the University of St Andrews) as Professor of Chemistry in 1908.

In 1888 he was elected a Fellow of the Royal Society of Edinburgh. His proposers were Alexander Crum Brown, Leonard Dobbin, John M. MacFarlane, and John Chemist. He won the Society's Keith Prize for the period 1899–1901. He was elected a Fellow of the Royal Society of London in 1904.

He died in London on 5 September 1913 aged 45. He is buried in Grange Cemetery in south Edinburgh with his parents. The grave lies in the linear eastern section.

== Publications ==
- Salts and Their Reactions (co-written with Leonard Dobbin)
- Hugh Marshall (1891). "LXXIV. Contributions from the Chemical Laboratory of the University of Edinburgh. No. V. The trisulphates". J. Chem. Soc., Trans. 59: 771–786. doi:10.1039/CT8915900771.
- Marshall, Hugh (1902). "Suggested Modifications of the Sign of Equality for Use in Chemical Notation". Proceedings of the Royal Society of Edinburgh. 24: 85–87. doi:10.1017/S0370164600007720.
