= Silver(I,III) oxide =

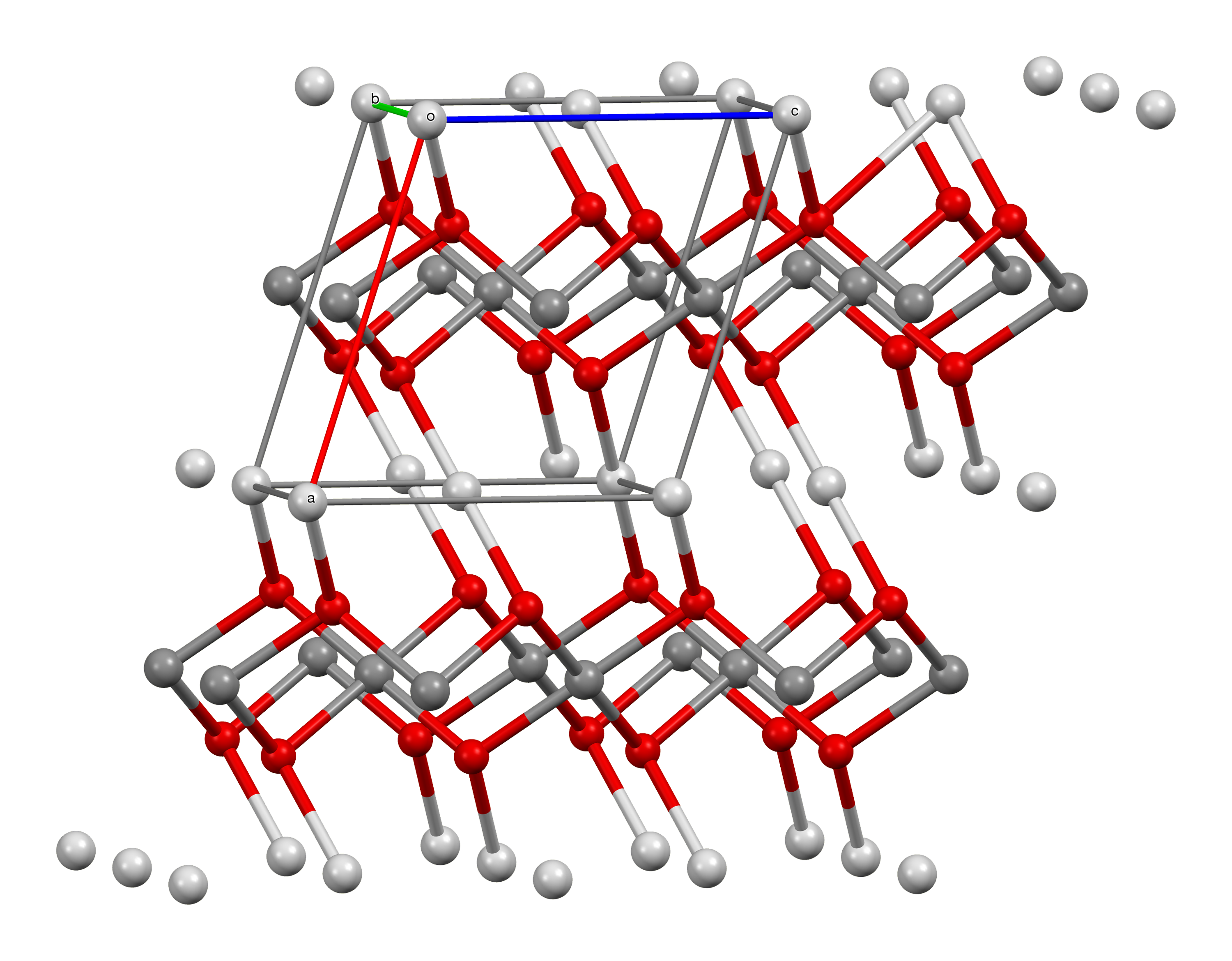
- Silver(I,III) Oxide Ag(I) Ag(III) O

Names
- IUPAC name silver(I,III) Oxide
- Other names: Argentic oxide; Divasil; Silver peroxide; Silver suboxide; Tetrasilver tetroxide

Identifiers
CAS Number	1301-96-8; 155645-89-9 (Note: https://pubchem.ncbi.nlm.nih.gov/compound/44150047 lists only CAS 155645-89-9. Perhaps the CASNo 1301-96-8 is due to https://patents.justia.com/patent/6645531 (Antelman, year 2000): "Tetrasilver tetroxide compositions... have been commercially sold under the poorly named “Ag(II) OXIDE” tradename. They may be obtained from Aldrich Chemical Co., Inc...")
3D model (JSmol)	Interactive image
ChemSpider	57524795
ECHA InfoCard	100.013.726
EC Number	215-098-2
PubChem CID	44150047
UNII	4C3LTJ9O6J
- InChI: InChI=1S/4Ag.4O Key: RARXNJBGGSMBMG-UHFFFAOYSA-N
- SMILES: [Ag]O[Ag].O=[Ag]O[Ag]=O

Properties
Chemical formula	Ag_{4}O_{4} Ag_{2}O.Ag_{2}O_{3}
Molar mass	123.87 g/mol
Appearance	grey-black powder diamagnetic
Density	7.48 g/cm^{3}
Melting point	>100 °C (decomposes)
Solubility in water	0.0027 g/100 mL
Solubility	soluble in alkalis

Hazards
- GHS labelling
Pictograms	(GHS03: Oxidizing) (GHS05: Corrosive) (GHS07: Exclamation mark) (GHS09: Environmental hazard)
Signal word	Danger
Hazard statements	H272, H315, H319, H335
NFPA 704 (fire diamond)	3 0 1
- Except where otherwise noted, data are given for materials in their standard state (at 25 °C [77 °F], 100 kPa). verify (what is ?) Infobox references

Silver(I,III) oxide or tetrasilver tetroxide is the inorganic compound with the formula Ag_{4}O_{4}. It is a component of silver zinc batteries. It can be prepared by the slow addition of a silver(I) salt to a persulfate solution e.g. AgNO_{3} to a Na_{2}S_{2}O_{8} solution. It adopts an unusual structure, being a mixed-valence compound. It is a dark brown solid that decomposes with evolution of O_{2} in water. It dissolves in concentrated nitric acid to give brown solutions containing the Ag^{2+} ion.

== Structure ==
Although its empirical formula, AgO, suggests that the compound tetrasilver tetraoxide has silver in the +2 oxidation state, each unit has two monovalent silver atoms bonded to an oxygen atom, and two trivalent silver atoms bonded to three oxygen atoms, and it is in fact diamagnetic. X-ray diffraction studies show that the silver atoms adopt two different coordination environments, one having two collinear oxide neighbours and the other four coplanar oxide neighbours. tetrasilver tetraoxide is therefore formulated as Ag^{I}Ag^{III}O_{2} or Ag_{2}O·Ag_{2}O_{3}. It has previously been called silver peroxide, which is incorrect since it does not contain the peroxide ion, O_{2}^{2−}.

== Uses ==
Tetrasilver tetroxide has been marketed under a trade name "Tetrasil." In 2010, the FDA issued a warning letter to an American company concerning the firm's marketing of Tetrasil and Genisil ointments of tetrasilver tetroxide for herpes and similar conditions.
