= Elbs reaction =

Chemical reaction

The Elbs reaction is an organic reaction describing the pyrolysis of an ortho methyl substituted benzophenone to a condensed polyaromatic. The reaction is named after its inventor, the German chemist Karl Elbs, also responsible for the Elbs oxidation. The reaction was published in 1884. Elbs however did not correctly interpret the reaction product due to a lack of knowledge about naphthalene structure.

== Scope ==
The Elbs reaction enables the synthesis of condensed aromatic systems. As already demonstrated by Elbs in 1884 it is possible to obtain anthracene through dehydration. Larger aromatic systems like pentacene are also feasible. This reaction does not take place in a single step but leads first to dihydropentacene that is dehydrogenated in a second step with copper as a catalyst.

Elbs reaction to anthracite and pentacene

The acyl compounds required for this reaction can be obtained through a Friedel-Crafts acylation with aluminum chloride.

The Elbs reaction is sometimes accompanied by elimination of substituents and can be unsuited for substituted polyaromatics.

== Mechanism ==
More than three plausible mechanisms for the Elbs reaction have been suggested. The first mechanism, suggested by Fieser, begins with a heat-induced cyclisation of the benzophenone, followed by a [1,3]-hydride shift to give the compound . A dehydration reaction then affords the polyaromatic.

Fieser's mechanism

Alternatively, in the second mechanism, due to Cook, the methylated aromatic compound instead first undergoes a tautomerization followed by an electrocyclic reaction to give the same intermediate, which then similarly undergoes a [1,3]-hydride shift and dehydration.

Cook's mechanism

A third mechanism has also been proposed, involving pyrolytic radical generation.

== Variations ==
It is also possible to synthesise heterocyclic compounds via the Elbs reaction. In 1956 an Elbs reaction of a thiophene derivative was published. The expected linear product was not obtained due to a change in reaction mechanism after formation of the first intermediate which caused multiple free radical reaction steps.

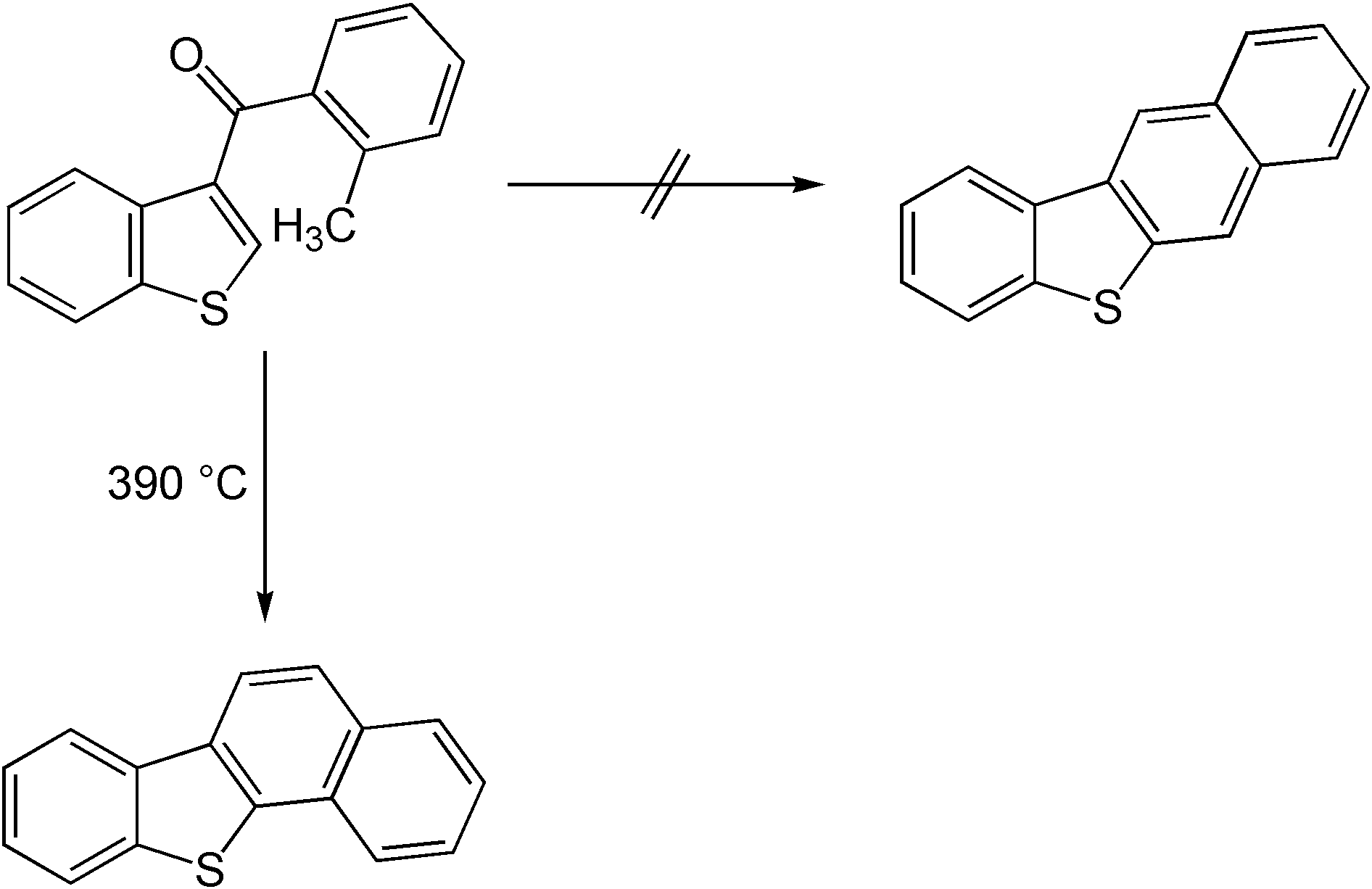
Heterocyclic Elbs reaction
