= Sodium persulfate =

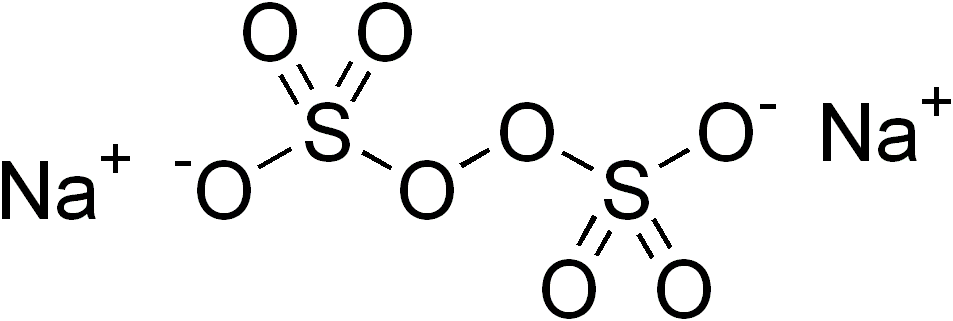
- Two sodium cations and one peroxodisulphate anion

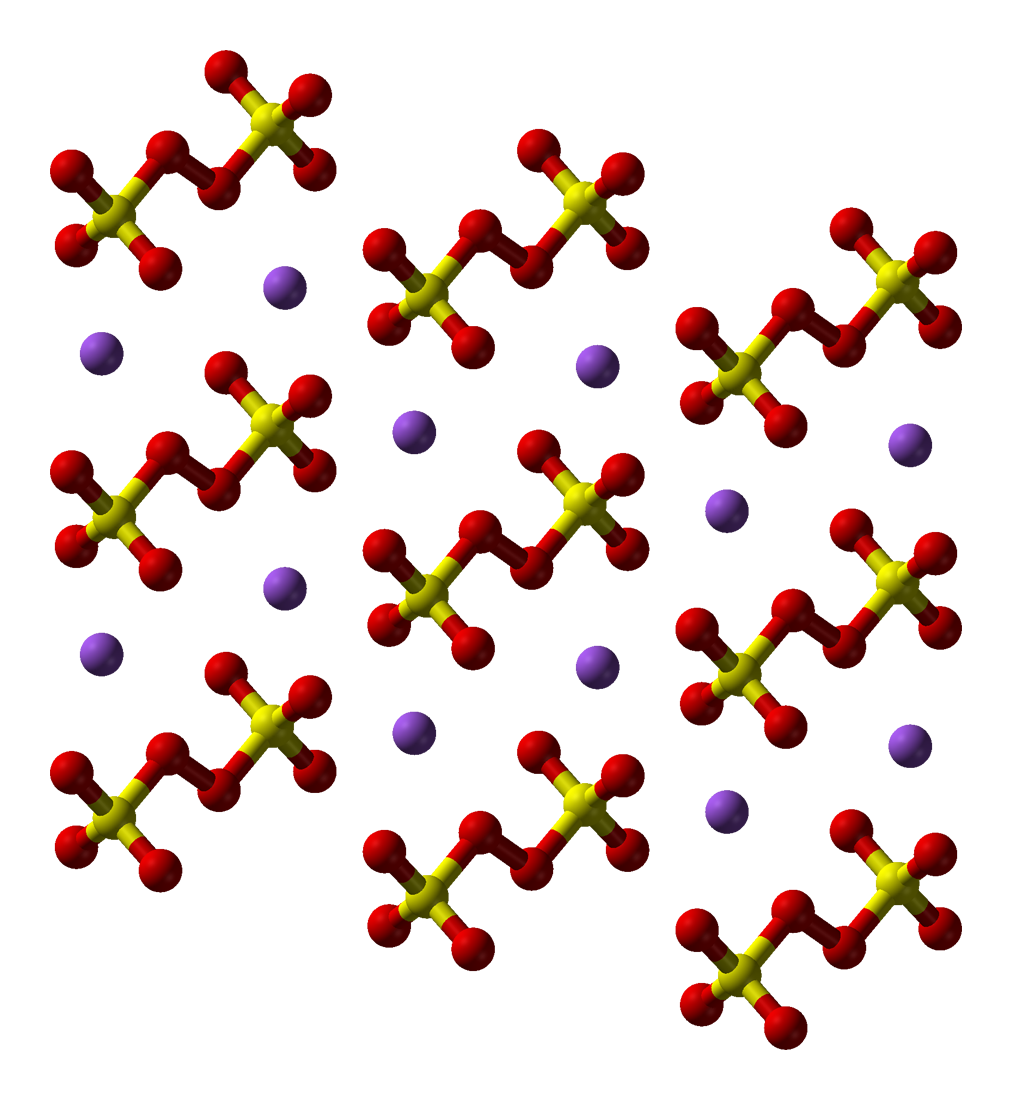
- Ball-and-stick model of the crystal structure

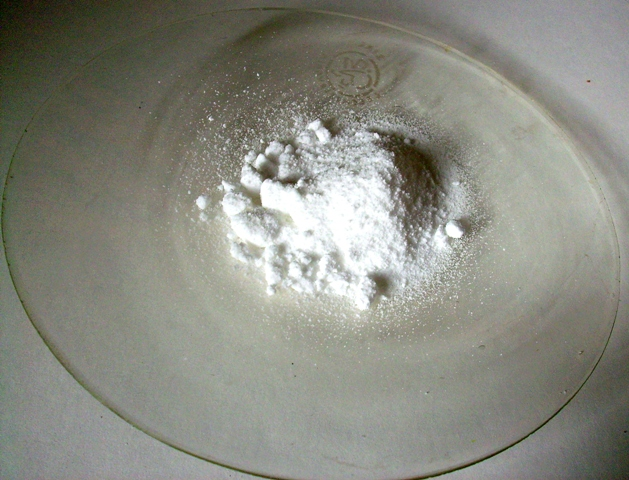
- Sodium persulfate as a white powder

Names
- Other names Sodium peroxodisulfate Sodium peroxodisulphate Sodium peroxydisulfate Sodium peroxydisulphate

Identifiers
CAS Number	7775-27-1
3D model (JSmol)	Interactive image
ChEMBL	ChEMBL502764
ChemSpider	56406
ECHA InfoCard	100.028.993
EC Number	231-892-1
PubChem CID	62655
RTECS number	SE0525000
UNII	J49FYF16JE
UN number	1505
CompTox Dashboard (EPA)	DTXSID4029698
- InChI: InChI=1S/2Na.H2O8S2/c;;1-9(2,3)7-8-10(4,5)6/h;;(H,1,2,3)(H,4,5,6)/q2*+1;/p-2 Key: CHQMHPLRPQMAMX-UHFFFAOYSA-L; InChI=1/2Na.H2O8S2/c;;1-9(2,3)7-8-10(4,5)6/h;;(H,1,2,3)(H,4,5,6)/q2*+1;/p-2 Key: CHQMHPLRPQMAMX-NUQVWONBAA
- SMILES: [Na+].[Na+].O=S(=O)([O-])OOS([O-])(=O)=O

Properties
Chemical formula	Na_{2}S_{2}O_{8}
Molar mass	238.10 g/mol
Appearance	White powder
Density	2.601 g/cm^{3}
Melting point	180 °C (356 °F; 453 K) decomposes
Solubility in water	55.6 g/100 ml (20 °C)

Hazards
- GHS labelling
Pictograms	(GHS03: Oxidizing) (GHS07: Exclamation mark) (GHS08: Health hazard)
Signal word	Danger
Hazard statements	H272, H302, H315, H317, H319, H334, H335, H371
Precautionary statements	P220, P261, P280, P305+P351+P338, P342+P311
NFPA 704 (fire diamond)	2 0 1 OX
Flash point	Non-flammable
Safety data sheet (SDS)	ICSC 1136

Related compounds
Other anions	Sodium dithionite Sodium sulfite Sodium sulfate
Other cations	Potassium persulfate
- Except where otherwise noted, data are given for materials in their standard state (at 25 °C [77 °F], 100 kPa). verify (what is ?) Infobox references

Sodium persulfate is the inorganic compound with the formula Na_{2}S_{2}O_{8}. It is the sodium salt of peroxydisulfuric acid, H_{2}S_{2}O_{8}, an oxidizing agent. It is a white solid that dissolves in water. It is almost non-hygroscopic and has good shelf-life.

== Production ==
The salt is prepared by the electrolytic oxidation of sodium bisulfate:

2 NaHSO_{4} → Na_{2}S_{2}O_{8} + H_{2}

Oxidation is conducted at a platinum anode. In this way about 165,000 tons were produced in 2005.

The standard redox potential of sodium persulfate into hydrogen sulfate is 2.1 V, which is higher than that of hydrogen peroxide (1.8 V) but lower than ozone (2.2 V). The sulfate radical formed in situ has a standard electrode potential of 2.7 V.

However, there are a few drawbacks in utilizing platinum anodes to produce the salts; the manufacturing process is inefficient due to oxygen evolution and the product could contain contaminants coming from platinum corrosion (mainly due to extremely oxidizing nature of the sulfate radical). Thus, boron-doped diamond electrodes have been proposed as alternatives to the conventional platinum electrodes.

== Structure ==
The sodium and potassium salts adopt very similar structures in the solid state, according to X-ray crystallography. In the sodium salt, the O-O distance is 1.476 Å. The sulfate groups are tetrahedral, with three short S-O distances near 1.44 and one long S-O bond at 1.64 Å.

== Applications ==
It is mainly used as a radical initiator for emulsion polymerization reactions for styrene based polymers such as acrylonitrile butadiene styrene. It is also applicable for accelerated curing of low formaldehyde adhesives.

=== Other uses ===
It is a bleach, both standalone (particularly in hair cosmetics) and as a detergent component. It is a replacement for ammonium persulfate in etching mixtures for zinc and printed circuit boards, and is used for pickling of copper and some other metals.

It is also used as a soil conditioner and for soil and groundwater remediation and in manufacture of dyestuffs, modification of starch, bleach activator, desizing agent for oxidative desizing, etc.

=== Organic chemistry ===
Sodium persulfate is a specialized oxidizing agent in chemistry, classically in the Elbs persulfate oxidation and the Boyland–Sims oxidation reactions. It is also used in radical reactions; for example in a synthesis of diapocynin from apocynin where iron(II) sulfate is the radical initiator.

== Safety ==
The salt is an oxidizer and forms combustible mixtures with organic materials such as paper.
