= C9H9NO5 =

The molecular formula C_{9}H_{9}NO_{5} (molar mass: 211.17 g/mol) may refer to:

- DIMBOA, or 2,4-dihydroxy-7-methoxy-1,4-benzoxazin-3-one
- Nitroapocynin
- Topaquinone (TPQ)
