= Persulfate =

Class of chemical compounds

A persulfate (sometimes known as peroxysulfate or peroxodisulfate) is a compound containing the anions SO^{2−}_{5} or S_{2}O^{2−}_{8}. The anion SO^{2−}_{5} contains one peroxide group per sulfur center, whereas in S_{2}O^{2−}_{8}, the peroxide group bridges the sulfur atoms. In both cases, sulfur adopts the normal tetrahedral geometry typical for the S(VI) oxidation state. These salts are strong oxidizers.

== Ions ==
- Peroxomonosulfate ion, SO^{2−}_{5}
- Peroxydisulfate S_{2}O^{2−}_{8}

== Acids ==
- Peroxymonosulfuric acid (Caro's acid), H_{2}SO_{5}
- Peroxydisulfuric acid, H_{2}S_{2}O_{8}

== Example salts ==
- Sodium peroxomonosulfate, Na_{2}SO_{5}
- Potassium peroxymonosulfate, KHSO_{5}
- Sodium persulfate (sodium peroxydisulfate), Na_{2}S_{2}O_{8}
- Ammonium persulfate (ammonium peroxydisulfate), (NH_{4})_{2}S_{2}O_{8}
- Potassium persulfate (potassium peroxydisulfate), K_{2}S_{2}O_{8}
- Oxone is a triple salt 2KHSO_{5}·KHSO_{4}·K_{2}SO_{4}
