= Silver zinc battery =

Battery made of silver(I,III) oxide and zinc

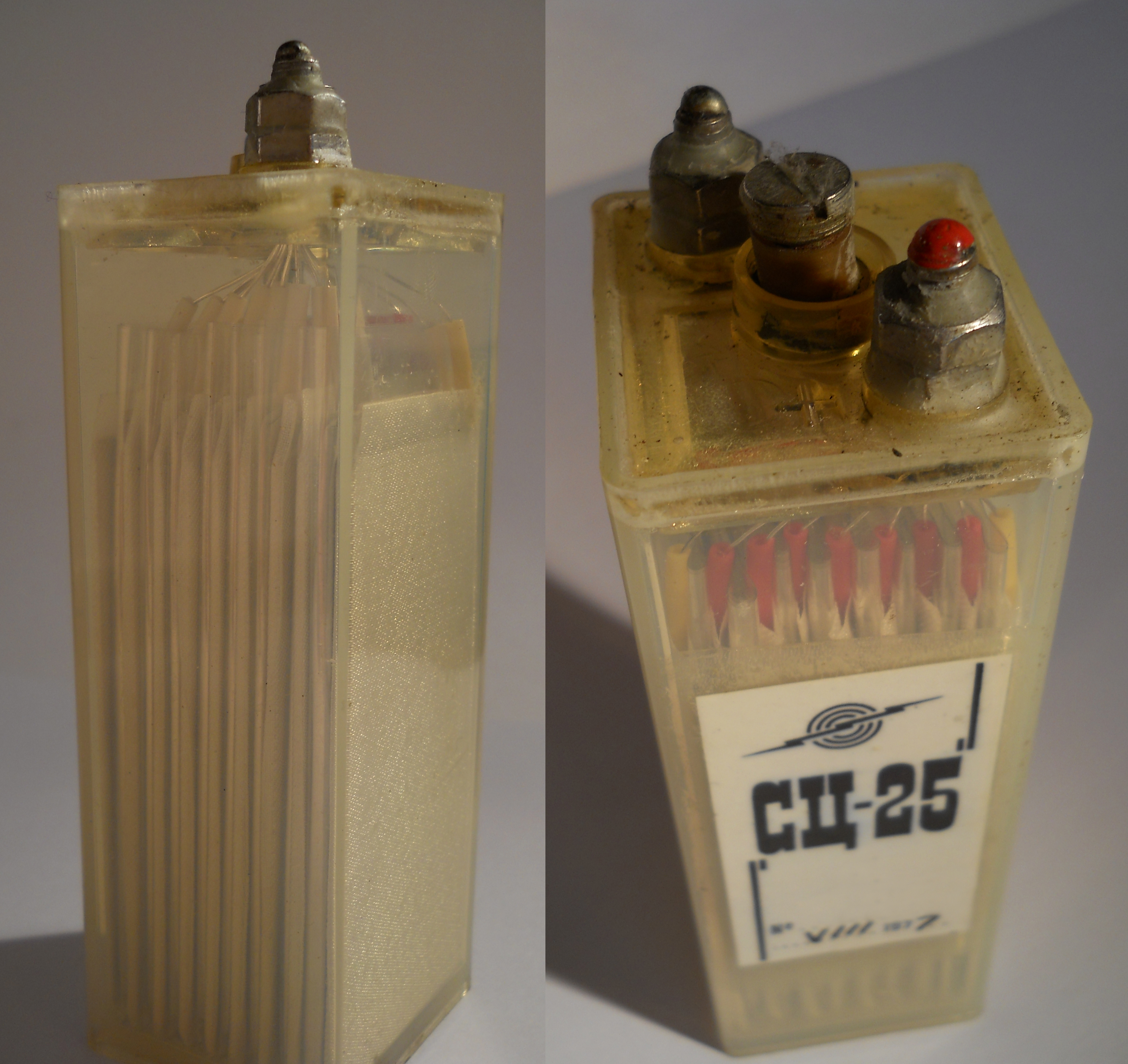
Soviet Silver-oxide battery SC-25

A silver zinc battery is a secondary cell that utilizes silver(I,III) oxide and zinc.

== Overview ==
Silver zinc cells share most of the characteristics of the silver-oxide battery, and in addition, is able to deliver one of the highest specific energies of all presently known electrochemical power sources. Long used in specialized applications, it is now being developed for more mainstream markets, for example, batteries in laptops and hearing aids.

Silver–zinc batteries, in particular, are being developed to power flexible electronic applications, where the reactants are integrated directly into flexible substrates, such as polymers or paper, using printing or chemical deposition methods.

Experimental new silver–zinc technology (different to silver-oxide) may provide up to 40% more run time than lithium-ion batteries and also features a water-based chemistry that is free from the thermal runaway and flammability problems that have plagued the lithium-ion alternatives.

== Chemistry ==
The silver–zinc battery is manufactured in a fully discharged condition and has the opposite electrode composition, the cathode being of metallic silver, while the anode is a mixture of zinc oxide and pure zinc powders. The electrolyte used is a potassium hydroxide solution in water.

During the charging process, silver is first oxidized to silver(I) oxide

2 Ag(s) + 2 OH^{−} → Ag_{2}O + H_{2}O + 2 e^{−}

and then to silver(II) oxide

Ag_{2}O + 2 OH^{−} → 2 AgO + H_{2}O + 2 e^{−},

while the zinc oxide is reduced to metallic zinc

2 Zn(OH)_{2} + 4 e^{−} ⇌ 2 Zn + 4 OH^{−}.

The process is continued until the cell potential reaches a level where the decomposition of the electrolyte is possible at about 1.55 volts. This is taken as the end of a charge, as no further charge is stored, and any oxygen that might be generated poses a mechanical and fire hazard to the cell.

== History and usage ==
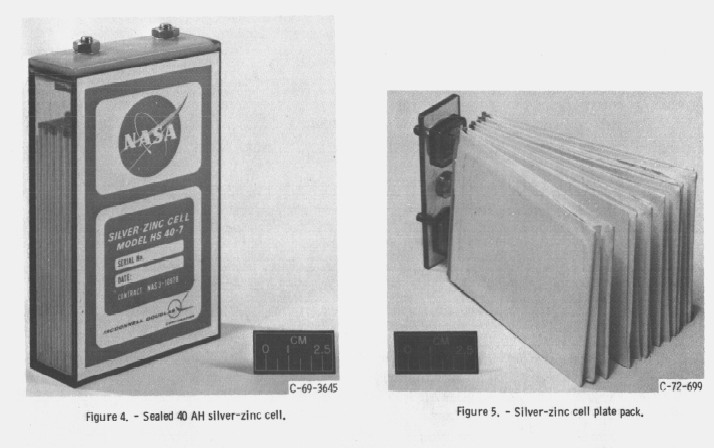
Sealed 40AH silver-zinc cell and cell plates pack

This technology had the highest energy density prior to lithium technologies. Primarily developed for aircraft, they have long been used in space launchers and crewed spacecraft, where their short cycle life is not a drawback. Non-rechargeable silver–zinc batteries powered the first Soviet Sputnik satellites, as well as US Saturn launch vehicles, the Apollo Lunar Module, lunar rover and life-support backpack.

The primary power sources for the Apollo command module (CM) were the hydrogen/oxygen fuel cells in the service module (SM). They provided greater energy densities than any conventional battery, but peak-power limitations required supplementation by silver–zinc batteries in the CM that also became its sole power supply during re-entry after separation of the service module. Only these batteries were recharged in flight.

After the Apollo 13 near-disaster, an auxiliary silver–zinc battery was added to the service module as a backup to the fuel cells. The Apollo service modules used as crew ferries to the Skylab space station were powered by three silver–zinc batteries between undocking and service module jettison, as the hydrogen and oxygen tanks could not store fuel-cell reactants through the long stays at the station.

These cells are found in applications for the military, for example in Mark 37 torpedoes and on Alfa-class submarines.

in the 1960s General Motors developed an electric car called Electrovair, which was powered by a zinc-silver battery produced by Eagle-Picher. However, the battery was expensive and lasted only a hundred charge-discharge cycles.

== See also ==
- History of the battery
- Fuel cell
- Battery recycling
- List of battery types
- List of battery sizes
- Comparison of battery types
- Battery nomenclature
