= Peroxomonosulfate =

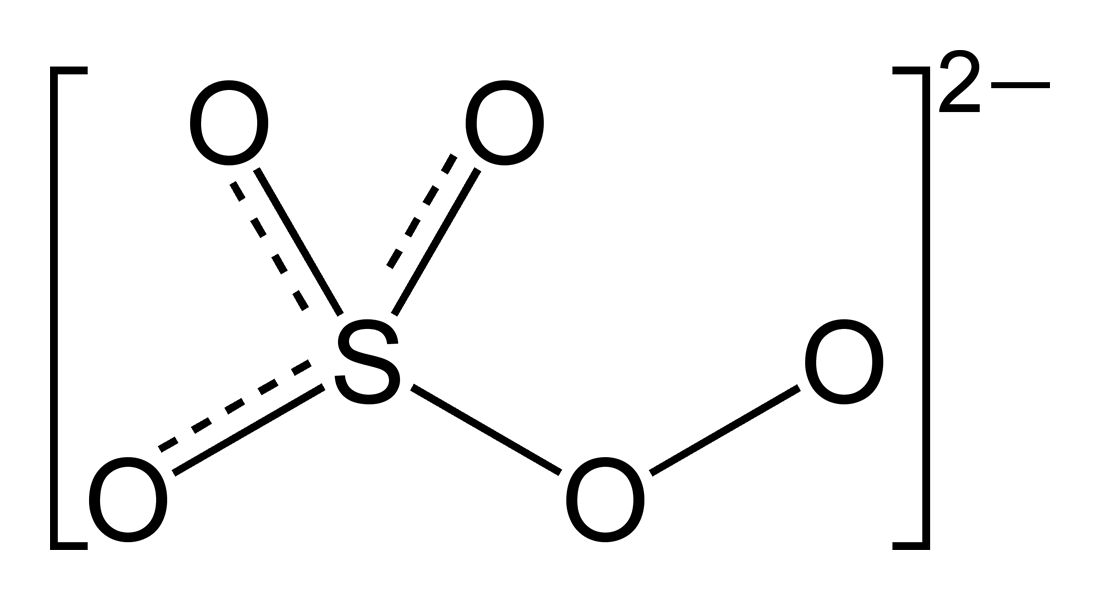

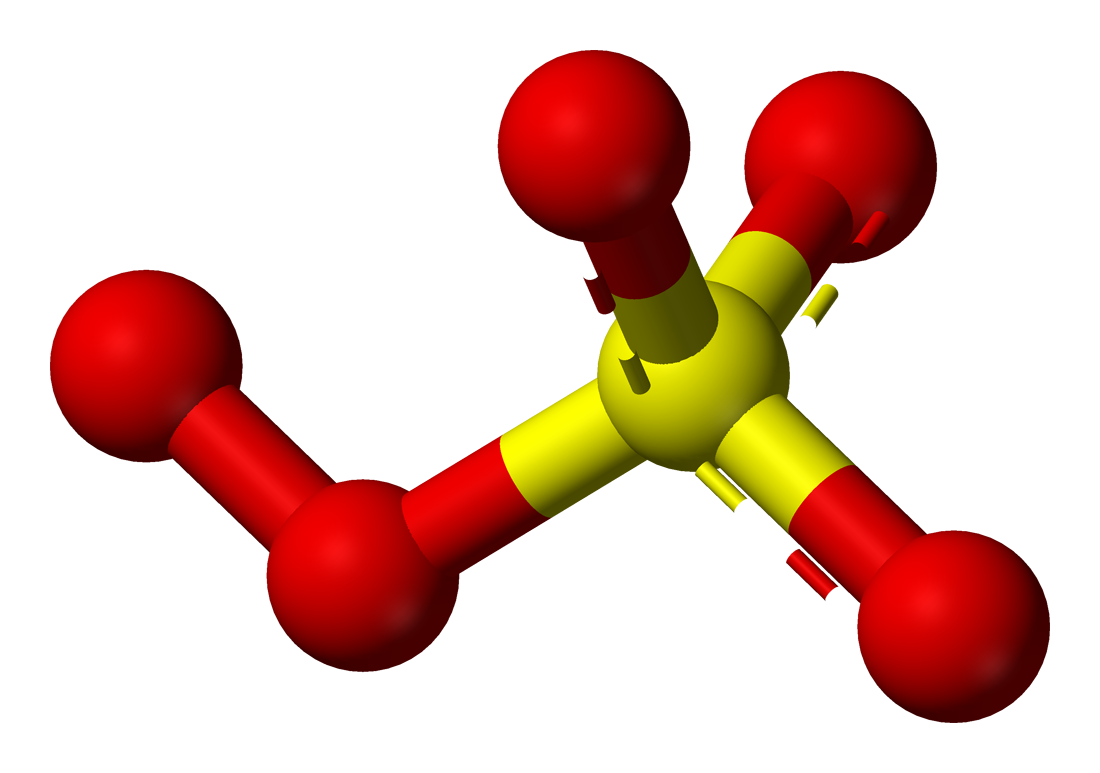

Names
- Other names Persulfate

Identifiers
CAS Number	22047-43-4
3D model (JSmol)	Interactive image
ChEBI	CHEBI:29288
ChemSpider	140599
Gmelin Reference	101038
- InChI: InChI=1S/H2O5S/c1-5-6(2,3)4/h1H,(H,2,3,4)/p-2 Key: FHHJDRFHHWUPDG-UHFFFAOYSA-L
- SMILES: [O-]OS(=O)(=O)[O-]

Properties
Chemical formula	O_{5}S^{−2}
Molar mass	112.06 g·mol^{−1}
Conjugate acid	Peroxymonosulfuric acid
- Except where otherwise noted, data are given for materials in their standard state (at 25 °C [77 °F], 100 kPa). Infobox references

The peroxomonosulfate ion, SO^{2−}_{5}, is a sulfur oxoanion. It is sometimes referred to as the persulfate ion, but this term also refers to the peroxydisulfate ion, S_{2}O^{2−}_{8}.

Its other IUPAC names are sulfuroperoxoate and trioxidoperoxidosulfate(2−).

== Compounds containing peroxomonosulfate ==
- Na_{2}SO_{5}
- KHSO_{5}

== See also ==
- Peroxymonosulfuric acid
