= Peroxydisulfuric acid =

Persulfuric acid

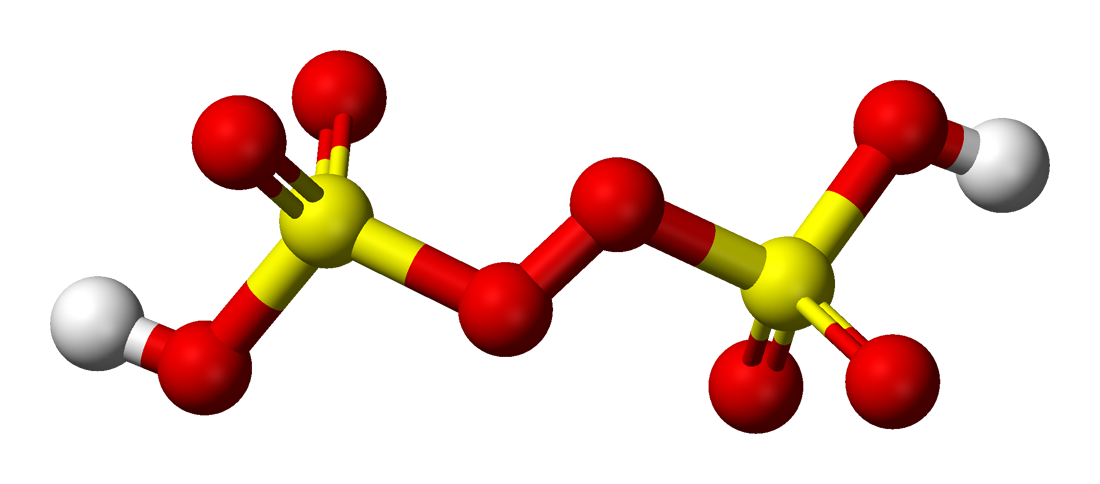

Names
- IUPAC names μ-peroxido-bis(hydroxidodioxidosulfur) peroxydisulfuric acid
- Other names Persulfuric acid, Peroxodisulfuric acid

Identifiers
CAS Number	13445-49-3
3D model (JSmol)	Interactive image
ChEBI	CHEBI:29268
ChemSpider	22822
PubChem CID	24413
UNII	2RQ1860626
CompTox Dashboard (EPA)	DTXSID00894926
- InChI: InChI=1S/H2O8S2/c1-9(2,3)7-8-10(4,5)6/h(H,1,2,3)(H,4,5,6) Key: JRKICGRDRMAZLK-UHFFFAOYSA-N; InChI=1/H2O8S2/c1-9(2,3)7-8-10(4,5)6/h(H,1,2,3)(H,4,5,6)/f/h1,4H; InChI=1/H2O8S2/c1-9(2,3)7-8-10(4,5)6/h(H,1,2,3)(H,4,5,6) Key: JRKICGRDRMAZLK-UHFFFAOYAS
- SMILES: O=S(=O)(OOS(=O)(=O)O)O

Properties
Chemical formula	H_{2}O_{8}S_{2}
Molar mass	194.13 g·mol^{−1}
Appearance	Colourless solid
Melting point	65 °C (149 °F; 338 K) (decomposes)
Solubility in water	soluble
Conjugate base	Peroxydisulfate

Related compounds
Other cations	Potassium persulfate Sodium persulfate Ammonium persulfate
Related compounds	Peroxymonosulfuric acid Pyrosulfuric acid
- Except where otherwise noted, data are given for materials in their standard state (at 25 °C [77 °F], 100 kPa). verify (what is ?) Infobox references

Peroxydisulfuric acid is an inorganic compound with a chemical formula (HO_{3}SO)_{2}. It is also called Marshall's acid after Professor Hugh Marshall, who discovered it in 1891.

== Structure and bonding ==
This oxoacid features sulfur in its +6 oxidation state and a peroxide group. Sulfur adopts the usual tetrahedral geometry.

== Synthesis ==
The acid is prepared by the reaction of chlorosulfuric acid with hydrogen peroxide:

2 ClSO_{3}H + H_{2}O_{2} → H_{2}S_{2}O_{8} + 2 HCl

Another method is the electrolysis of moderately concentrated sulfuric acid (60-70%) with platinum electrodes at high current density and voltage:

H_{2}SO_{4} + H_{2}O → H_{3}O^{+} + HSO_{4}^{−} (dissociation of sulfuric acid)
2 HSO_{4}^{−} → H_{2}S_{2}O_{8} + 2 e^{−} (E_{0} = +2.4V) (bisulfate oxidation)
2 H_{2}SO_{4} → H_{2}S_{2}O_{8} + H_{2} (overall reaction)
3 H_{2}O → O_{3} + 6 H^{+} (ozone produced as a side product)

== Uses ==
Peroxydisulfuric acid is a precursor to several salts including sodium peroxydisulfate, potassium peroxydisulfate, and ammonium peroxydisulfate. These salts are used to initiate the polymerization of acrylonitrile, styrene, and related monomers. This application exploits the tendency of the peroxydisulfate anion to undergo homolysis to produce radicals. Their solutions are also used for etching copper in circuit board manufacturing.

== See also ==
- Peroxymonosulfuric acid (Caro's acid)
- Piranha solution
