= Karl Elbs =

German chemist (1858–1933)

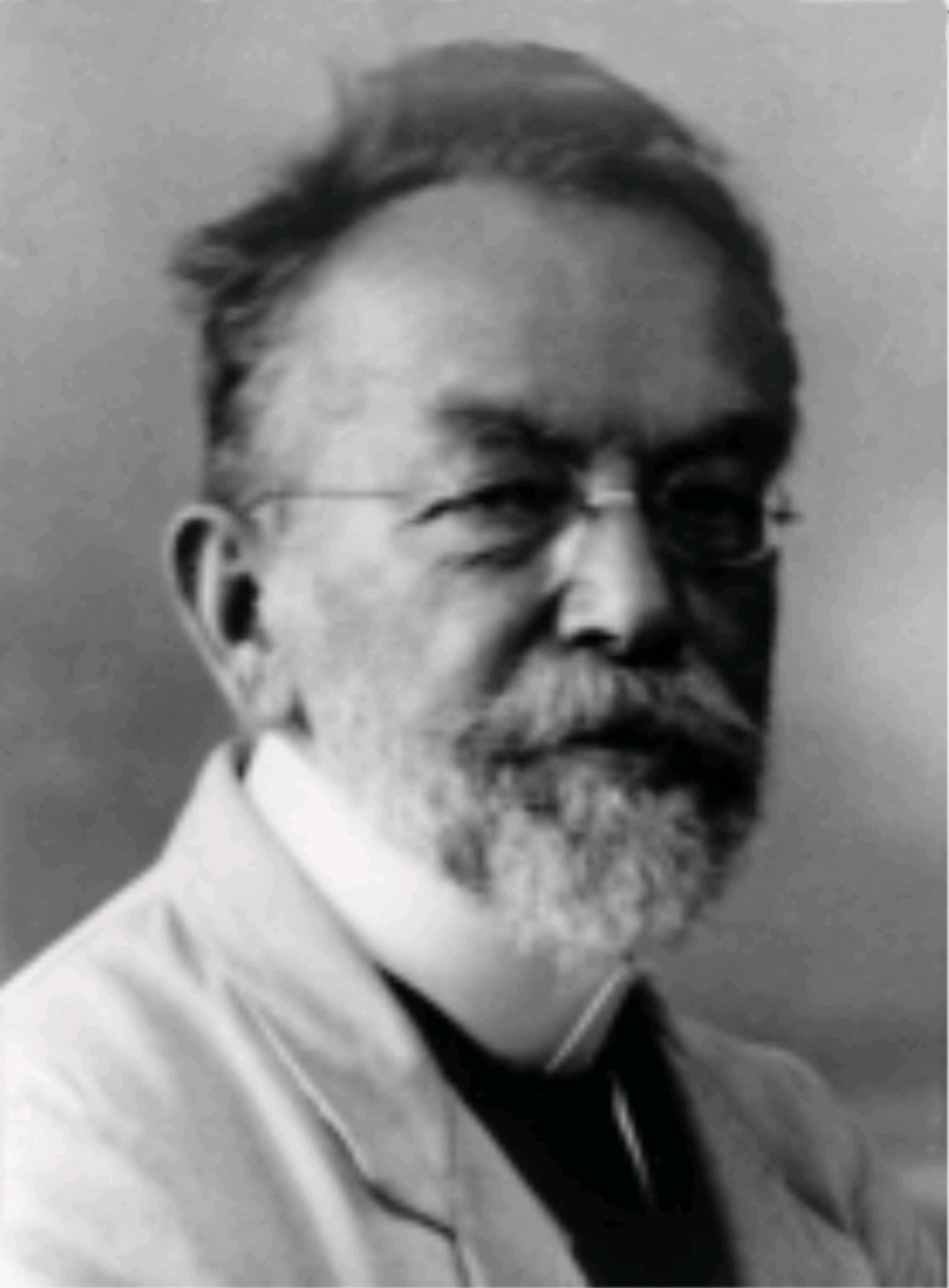
Karl Elbs

Karl Elbs (13 September 1858 in Alt-Breisach, Grand Duchy of Baden – 24 August 1933) was a German chemist. He is credited with developing the Elbs reaction for the synthesis of anthracene. He is also responsible for the Elbs persulfate oxidation.

From 1877 he studied natural sciences at the University of Freiburg, receiving his doctorate in 1880 under the direction of Adolf Karl Ludwig Claus. In 1887 he obtained his habilitation, then in 1894 was named a full professor at the University of Giessen, where he served as director of the physico-chemistry laboratory.

== Published works ==
- Die synthetischen Darstellungsmethoden der Kohlenstoff-Verbindungen, 1889 – Synthetic methods of preparation of carbon compounds.
- Die Akkumulatoren : eine gemeinfassliche Darlegung ihrer Wirkungsweise, Leistung und Behandlung, 1896 – Accumulators; their action, performance and handling.
- Übungsbeispiele für die Elektrolytische Darstellung chemischer Präparate. Zum Gebrauch im Laboratorium für Chemiker und Elektrochemiker, 1902, translated into English and published as Electrolytic Preparations: Exercises for Use in the Laboratory by Chemists and Electro-chemists (1903).
