= Diapocynin =

Names
- Preferred IUPAC name 1,1′-(6,6′-Dihydroxy-5,5′-dimethoxy[1,1′-biphenyl]-3,3′-diyl)di(ethan-1-one)
- Other names Diapocynin, 4′,4′′′-Dihydroxy-5′,5′′′-dimethoxy-3′,3′′′-biacetophenone

Identifiers
CAS Number	29799-22-2
3D model (JSmol)	Interactive image
ChEMBL	ChEMBL38775
ChemSpider	8103122
ECHA InfoCard	100.233.239
PubChem CID	9927489
UNII	A65KM2ZD49
CompTox Dashboard (EPA)	DTXSID701032857
- InChI: InChI=1S/C18H18O6/c1-9(19)11-5-13(17(21)15(7-11)23-3)14-6-12(10(2)20)8-16(24-4)18(14)22/h5-8,21-22H,1-4H3 Key: HLNDPICGHQGWSU-UHFFFAOYSA-N; InChI=1/C18H18O6/c1-9(19)11-5-13(17(21)15(7-11)23-3)14-6-12(10(2)20)8-16(24-4)18(14)22/h5-8,21-22H,1-4H3 Key: HLNDPICGHQGWSU-UHFFFAOYAP
- SMILES: CC(=O)C1=CC(=C(C(=C1)OC)O)C2=C(C(=CC(=C2)C(=O)C)OC)O

Properties
Chemical formula	C_{18}H_{18}O_{6}
Molar mass	330.336 g·mol^{−1}
Appearance	brown color

Hazards
- GHS labelling
Pictograms	(GHS09: Environmental hazard)
Signal word	Warning
Hazard statements	H410
Precautionary statements	P273, P391, P501
- Except where otherwise noted, data are given for materials in their standard state (at 25 °C [77 °F], 100 kPa). Infobox references

Diapocynin is a dimer of apocynin.

== Synthesis ==
Diapocynin is synthesized by the activation of apocynin with ferrous sulfate and sodium persulfate. Similar to apocynin, it is shown to have some beneficial effects against oxidative stress and reducing reactive oxygen species.
