= Apocynin =

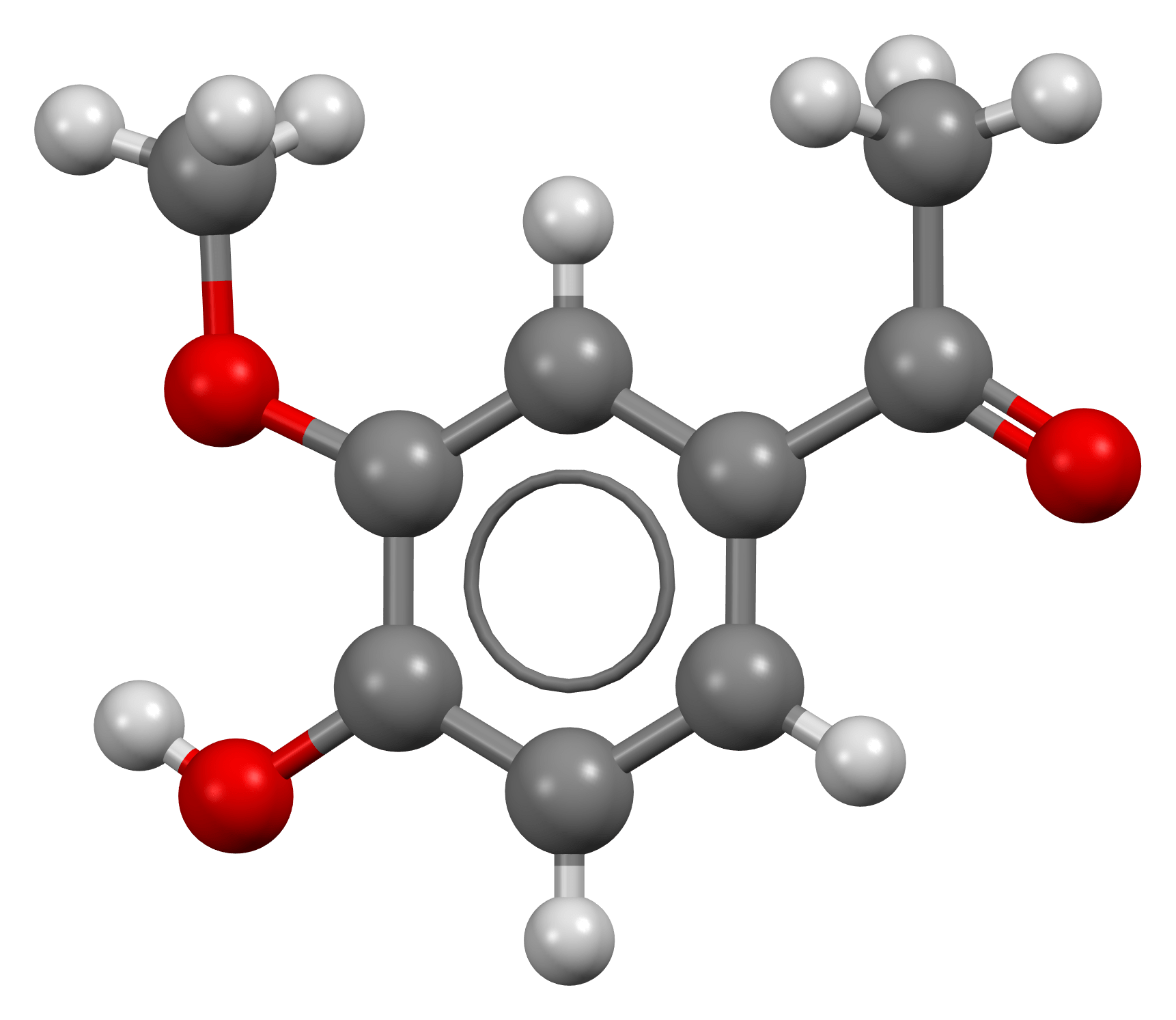

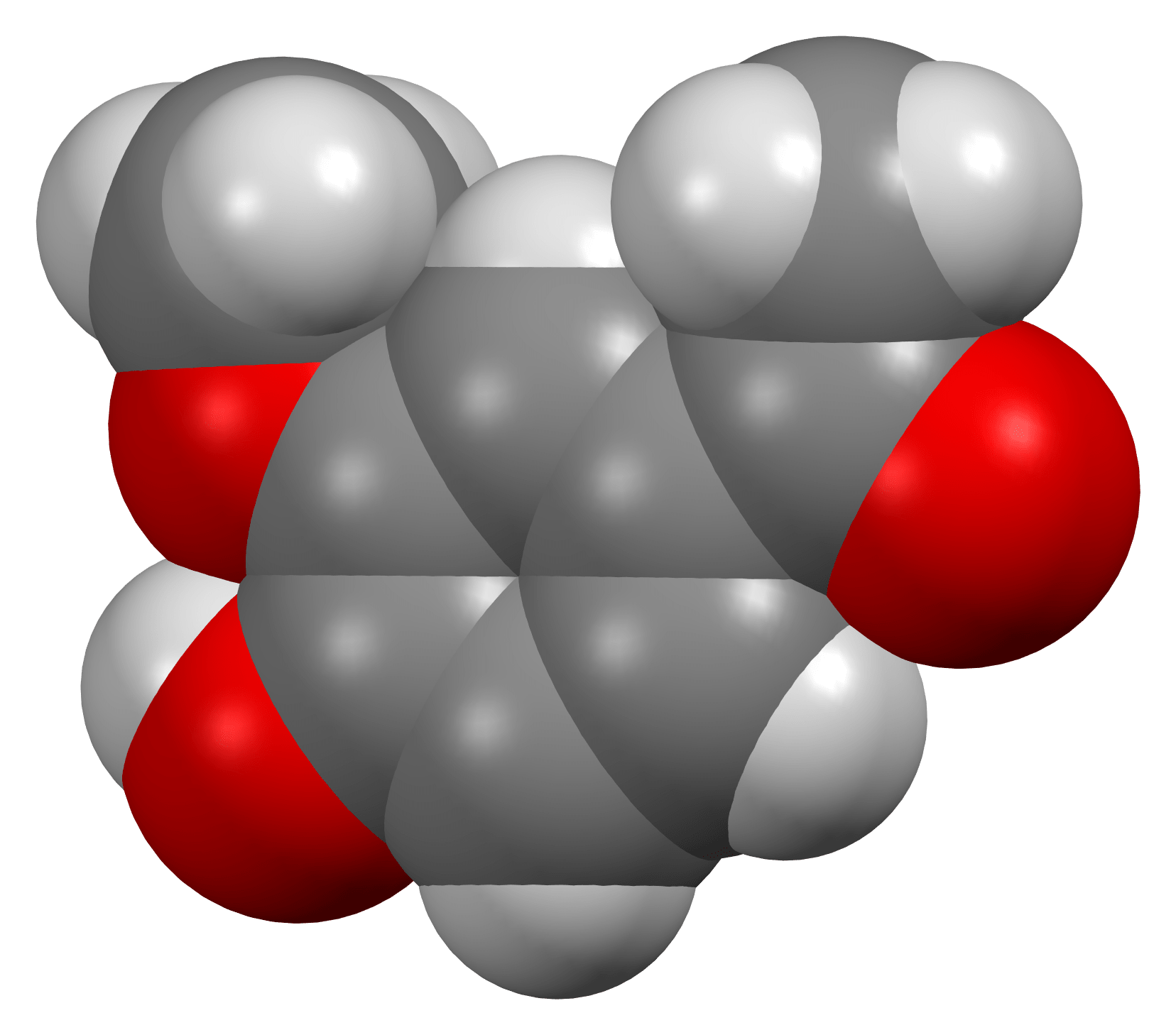

Names
- Preferred IUPAC name 1-(4-Hydroxy-3-methoxyphenyl)ethan-1-one
- Other names 1-(4-Hydroxy-3-methoxyphenyl)ethanone; 4-Hydroxy-3-methoxyacetophenone; Acetovanillone

Identifiers
CAS Number	498-02-2
3D model (JSmol)	Interactive image
ChEBI	CHEBI:2781
ChEMBL	ChEMBL346919
ChemSpider	21106900
ECHA InfoCard	100.007.141
KEGG	C11380
PubChem CID	2214
UNII	B6J7B9UDTR
CompTox Dashboard (EPA)	DTXSID7060097
- InChI: InChI=1S/C9H10O3/c1-6(10)7-3-4-8(11)9(5-7)12-2/h3-5,11H,1-2H3 Key: DFYRUELUNQRZTB-UHFFFAOYSA-N; InChI=1/C9H10O3/c1-6(10)7-3-4-8(11)9(5-7)12-2/h3-5,11H,1-2H3 Key: DFYRUELUNQRZTB-UHFFFAOYAW
- SMILES: Oc1ccc(cc1OC)C(C)=O

Properties
Chemical formula	C_{9}H_{10}O_{3}
Molar mass	166.17 g/mol
Melting point	115 °C (239 °F; 388 K)
Boiling point	295–300 °C (563–572 °F; 568–573 K)
- Except where otherwise noted, data are given for materials in their standard state (at 25 °C [77 °F], 100 kPa). verify (what is ?) Infobox references

Apocynin, also known as acetovanillone, is a natural organic compound structurally related to vanillin. It has been isolated from a variety of plant sources and is being studied for its variety of pharmacological properties.

== History ==
Apocynin was first described by Oswald Schmiedeberg, a German pharmacologist, in 1883 and was first isolated by Horace Finnemore, in 1908, from the root of Canadian hemp (Apocynum cannabinum). At the time, this plant was already used for its known effectiveness against edema and heart problems. In 1971, apocynin was also isolated from Picrorhiza kurroa, a small plant that grows at high altitudes in the western Himalayas. P. kurroa was used for ages as a treatment for liver and heart problems, jaundice, and asthma. In 1990, Simons et al. isolated apocynin to a pharmacologically useful level using an actively guided isolation procedure. Apocynin's observed anti-inflammatory capabilities proved to be a result of its ability to selectively prevent the formation of free radicals, oxygen ions, and peroxides in the body. Apocynin has since been extensively studied to help determine its disease-fighting capabilities and applications.

== In food flavoring ==
Acetovanillone is responsible for the allegedly richer flavor profile of lignin-based artificial vanilla flavoring compared to guaiacol-based artificial vanilla: it is present in the former but not in the latter. Blind taste-testing panels cannot distinguish between the flavors of synthetic vanillin from lignin and those from guaicol, but can distinguish the odors of these two types of synthetic vanilla extracts. Guaiacol vanillin, adulterated with acetovanillone, has an odor indistinguishable from lignin vanillin.

== Physical properties ==
Apocynin is a solid with a melting point of 115 °C and the faint odor of vanilla. It is soluble in hot water, alcohol, benzene, chloroform, DMSO and DMF.

== Mode of action ==
NADPH oxidase is an enzyme that effectively reduces O_{2} to superoxide (O_{2}^{–•}), which can be used by the immune system to kill bacteria and fungi. Apocynin is an inhibitor of NADPH oxidase activity and thus is effective in preventing the production of the superoxide in human agranulocytes or neutrophilic granulocytes. It does not however obstruct the phagocytic or other defense roles of granulocytes. Due to the selectivity of its inhibition, apocynin can be widely used as an inhibitor of NADPH oxidase without interfering in other aspects of the immune system.

Apocynin was used to determine whether ionic activation due to proton flux across the membrane of renal medulla cells was coupled to NADPH oxidase production of superoxide. Apocynin was introduced to the cells and completely blocked the production of superoxide, and was a key component in determining that the proton outflow was responsible for the activation of NADPH oxidase.

The mechanism of action of apocynin is not understood. In the experimental studies, apocynin is shown to dimerize and form diapocynin. Although, diapocynin seems to have beneficial effect in reducing reactive oxygen species and anti-inflammatory properties, it is still yet to be shown as biologically relevant molecule. Biotransformation of apocynin predominantly leads to glycosylated form of apocynin. Another molecule that is shown to form under experimental conditions is nitroapocynin.

== Research ==
Small scale early stage clinical trials for apocynin were conducted for chronic obstructive pulmonary disease (COPD) in 2011 and asthma in 2012 but they did not progress any further.

Other preliminary pre-clinical research includes:

- Anti-arthritic: Neutrophils are a key component of the pathogenesis of collagen-induced arthritis and in the mechanisms that lead to the start of inflammation of the joints. The action of apocynin reduces the presence of such cells before the inflammation has begun but it is unable to reverse inflammation that is already present.
- Bowel disease: Apocynin treatment in rats has been proven to lessen damage in the colon as well as the enzymatic activity of myeloperoxidase which is associated with inflammation. In addition, apocynin also decreased the number of macrophages and polymorphonuclear leukocytes in the colon.
- Anti-asthmatic: The glucoside of apocynin, androsin, is being investigated for the treatment of asthma for has been shown to prevent bronchial obstruction in guinea pigs. It is believed that the anti-asthmatic quality of apocynin comes from its interference with certain inflammatory processes.
- Atherosclerosis: Apocynin is used in the treatment of atherosclerosis in order to prevent the activity of NADPH oxidase activity, halting the production of reactive oxygen species. In effect, this inhibition stops initiation of disease in the endothelial cells.
- Familial ALS: Apocynin extended the lives of mutant mice and reduced glial cell toxicity of cultured cells lines with a defective superoxide dismutase 1 (SOD1) gene—a genetic defect found in some people with hereditary amyotrophic lateral sclerosis (ALS, or Lou Gehrig's disease). Researchers believe the benefit derives from a newly discovered role for SOD1 as a self-regulating redox sensor for NADPH oxidase-derived O2• production. The findings in mice may point to new drug targets for hereditary ALS.
- Skin stem cells: Apocynin promotes the synthesis of collagen 17 and by doing this it increases the survival of the mother cells derived from stem cells.
