= Boyland–Sims oxidation =

Chemical reaction

Named after	Eric Boyland; Peter Sims
Reaction type	Organic redox reaction

Identifiers
RSC ontology ID	RXNO:0000181

The Boyland–Sims oxidation is the chemical reaction of anilines with alkaline potassium persulfate, which after hydrolysis forms ortho-hydroxyl anilines. The reaction is generally performed in water at room temperatures or below, using equimolar quantities of reagents.

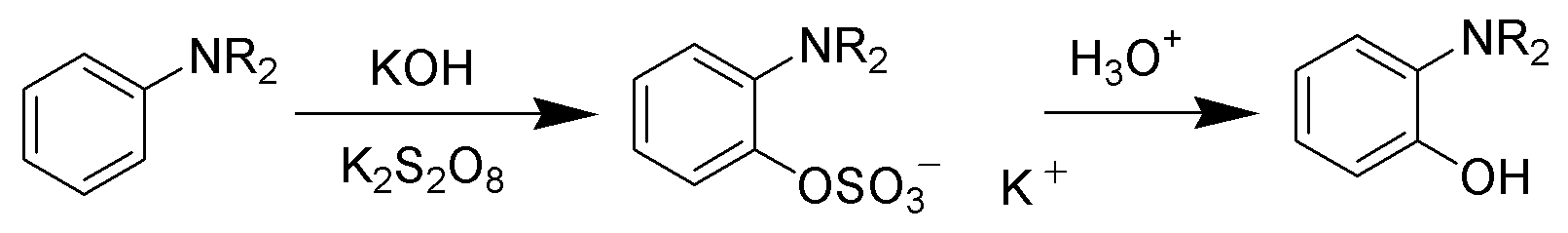
The Boyland-Sims oxidation

The ortho-isomer is formed predominantly. However, the para-sulfate is formed in small amounts with certain anilines.

== Scope and mechanism ==
The reaction is disadvantaged by moderate to low chemical yields, but is simple to perform and uses mild conditions. Some competitive oxidation of the nitrogen has been observed.

Behrman has shown that the first intermediate in the Boyland–Sims oxidation is the formation of an arylhydroxylamine-O-sulfate (2). Rearrangement of this zwitterionic intermediate forms the ortho- sulfate (5), which then hydrolyses to form the ortho-hydroxyl aniline.

The mechanism of the Boyland-Sims oxidation

== See also ==
- Elbs persulfate oxidation
