= Peroxymonosulfuric acid =

Powerful oxidizing agent

- Skeletal formula of peroxymonosulfuric acid

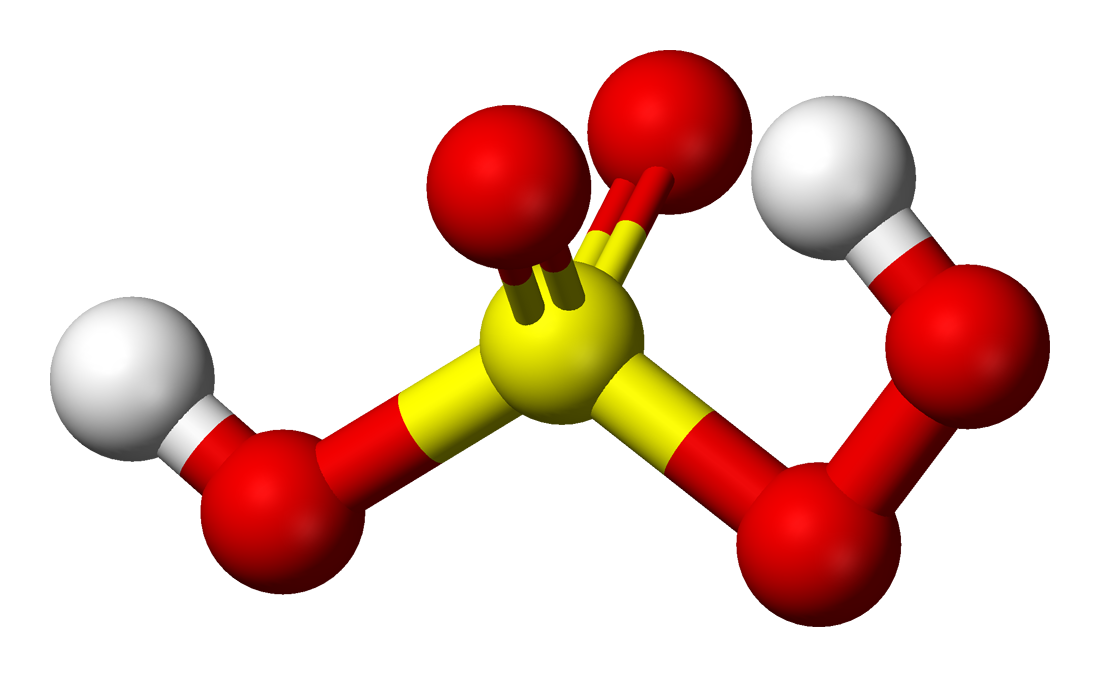
- Ball and stick model of peroxymonosulfuric acid

Names
- IUPAC names Peroxysulfuric acid Sulfuroperoxoic acid
- Systematic IUPAC name (Dioxidanido)hydroxidodioxidosulfur
- Other names Peroxosulfuric acid Peroxomonosulfuric acid Persulfuric acid Caro's acid

Identifiers
CAS Number	7722-86-3
3D model (JSmol)	Interactive image; Interactive image
ChEBI	CHEBI:29286
ChemSpider	2035480
ECHA InfoCard	100.028.879
EC Number	231-766-6
Gmelin Reference	101039
PubChem CID	2754594
UNII	JC6U8R2UJ9
UN number	1483
CompTox Dashboard (EPA)	DTXSID90884417
- InChI: InChI=1S/H2O5S/c1-5-6(2,3)4/h1H,(H,2,3,4) Key: FHHJDRFHHWUPDG-UHFFFAOYSA-N
- SMILES: OOS(O)(=O)=O; [O].[O].OOSO

Properties
Chemical formula	H_{2}SO_{5}
Molar mass	114.078 g mol^{−1}
Appearance	White crystals
Density	2.239 g cm^{−3}
Melting point	45 °C
Acidity (pK_{a})	1, 9.3
Conjugate base	Peroxomonosulfate

Structure
Coordination geometry	Tetrahedral at S

Hazards
- Occupational safety and health (OHS/OSH)
Main hazards	strong oxidizer
- Except where otherwise noted, data are given for materials in their standard state (at 25 °C [77 °F], 100 kPa). verify (what is ?) Infobox references

Peroxymonosulfuric acid, also known as persulfuric acid, peroxysulfuric acid or Caro's Acid is the inorganic compound with the formula H_{2}SO_{5}. It is a white solid. It is a component of Caro's acid, which is a solution of peroxymonosulfuric acid in sulfuric acid containing small amounts of water. Peroxymonosulfuric acid is a very strong oxidant (E^{0} = +2.51 V).

== Structure ==
In peroxymonosulfuric acid, the S(VI) center adopts its characteristic tetrahedral geometry; the connectivity is indicated by the formula HO–O–S(O)_{2}–OH. The S-O-H proton is more acidic.

== History ==
The German chemist Heinrich Caro first reported investigations of mixtures of hydrogen peroxide and sulfuric acid.

== Synthesis and production ==
One laboratory scale preparation of Caro's acid involves the combination of chlorosulfuric acid and hydrogen peroxide:

H_{2}O_{2} + ClSO_{2}OH ⇌ H_{2}SO_{5} + HCl

Patents include more than one reaction for preparation of Caro's acid, usually as an intermediate for the production of potassium monopersulfate (PMPS), a bleaching and oxidizing agent. One route employs the following reaction:

H_{2}O_{2} + H_{2}SO_{4} ⇌ H_{2}SO_{5} + H_{2}O

This reaction occurs in the piranha solution.

== Uses in industry ==
H_{2}SO_{5} and Caro's acid have been used for a variety of disinfectant and cleaning applications, e.g., swimming pool treatment and denture cleaning. It is used in gold mining to destroy the cyanide in the waste stream (tailings).

Alkali metal salts of H_{2}SO_{5}, especially oxone, are widely investigated.

== Hazards ==
These peroxy acids can be explosive. Explosions have been reported at Brown University and Sun Oil. As with all strong oxidizing agents, peroxysulfuric acid is incompatible with organic compounds.

== See also ==
- Peroxydisulfuric acid H_{2}S_{2}O_{8}
- Peroxomonosulfate
