= Elbs persulfate oxidation =

Chemical reaction

| Named after | Karl Elbs |
| Reaction type | Organic redox reaction |

Identifiers
| RSC ontology ID | RXNO:0000179 |

The Elbs persulfate oxidation is the organic reaction of phenols with alkaline potassium persulfate to form para-diphenols. The reaction is generally performed in water at room temperatures or below, using equimolar quantities of reagents.

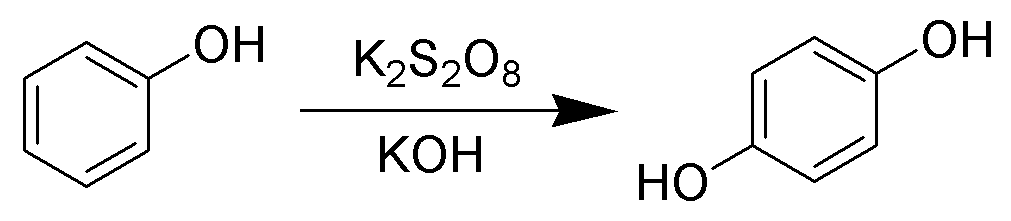
The Elbs persulfate oxidation

Several reviews have been published.

== Scope and mechanism ==
The reaction is disadvantaged by moderate to low chemical yields with recovery of starting material and complete consumption of the persulfate. It is suggested that the phenol in many cases is a catalyst converting the persulfate into a sulfate. Despite this, the Elbs reaction remains generally useful in a research setting, as it is simple to perform and is tolerant of a wide range of other functional groups, which are not oxidised under these conditions.

A reaction mechanism has been postulated which accounts for the observed para substitution featuring the tautomeric para carbanion of the starting phenolate ion: It begins with nucleophilic displacement on the peroxide oxygen of the peroxodisulfate (peroxydisulfate) ion, to give an intermediate sulfate group (3), which is then hydrolyzed to the hydroxyl group.

The Elbs persulfate oxidation

== See also ==
- Boyland–Sims oxidation
- Dakin reaction
