= Nitroapocynin =

Names
- Preferred IUPAC name 1-(4-Hydroxy-3-methoxy-5-nitrophenyl)ethan-1-one
- Other names 1-(4-hydroxy-3-methoxy-5-nitrophenyl)ethanone 4'-Hydroxy-3'-methoxy-5'-nitroacetophenone; Nitroapocynin; 5-Nitroapocynin

Identifiers
CAS Number	20716-41-0
3D model (JSmol)	Interactive image
ChemSpider	260051
PubChem CID	294764
UNII	P5EU8NHL98
CompTox Dashboard (EPA)	DTXSID00303967
- InChI: InChI=1S/C9H9NO5/c1-5(11)6-3-7(10(13)14)9(12)8(4-6)15-2/h3-4,12H,1-2H3 Key: PGKVPHVPNDBJTO-UHFFFAOYSA-N
- SMILES: CC(=O)C1=CC(=C(C(=C1)OC)O)[N+](=O)[O-]

Properties
Chemical formula	C_{9}H_{9}NO_{5}
Molar mass	211.173 g·mol^{−1}
Appearance	Yellow powder
- Except where otherwise noted, data are given for materials in their standard state (at 25 °C [77 °F], 100 kPa). Infobox references

Nitroapocynin is a mono-nitrated form of apocynin.

== Synthesis ==
Apocynin can be nitrated with sodium nitrate and acidic ionic liquid 1-butyl-3-methylimidazolium hexafluorophosphate in acetonitrile solvent.
