= Potassium persulfate =

- Two potassium cations and one peroxydisulfate anion

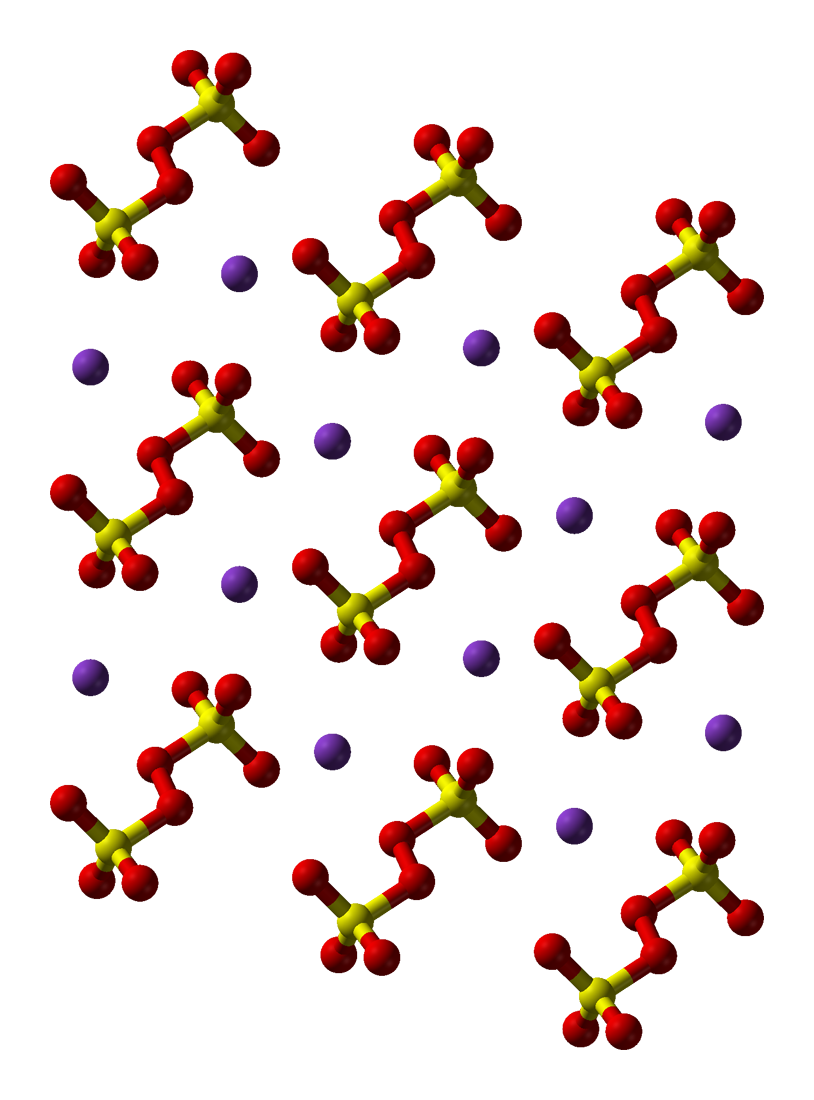
- Ball-and-stick model of the crystal structure

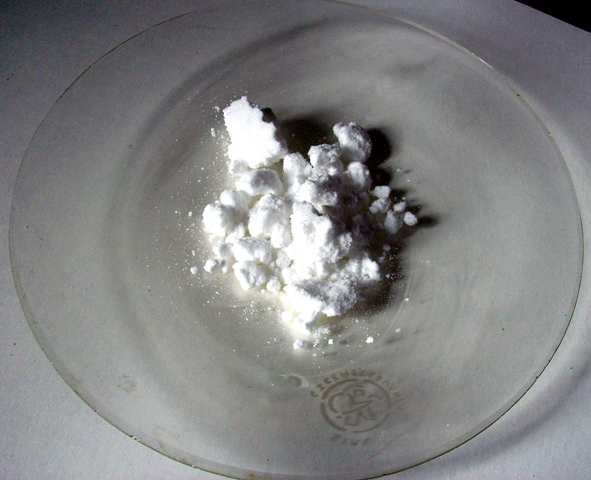
- Potassium persulfate as a white powder

Names
- Other names: potassium peroxydisulfate; Anthion; potassium perdisulfate

Identifiers
| CAS Number | 7727-21-1 |
| 3D model (JSmol) | Interactive image |
| ChemSpider | 22821 |
| ECHA InfoCard | 100.028.893 |
| EC Number | 231-781-8 |
| E number | E922 (glazing agents, ...) |
| PubChem CID | 24412 |
| RTECS number | SE0400000 |
| UNII | 6B86K0MCZC |
| UN number | 1492 |
| CompTox Dashboard (EPA) | DTXSID4029690 |
- InChI: InChI=1S/2K.H2O8S2/c;;1-9(2,3)7-8-10(4,5)6/h;;(H,1,2,3)(H,4,5,6)/q2*+1;/p-2 Key: USHAGKDGDHPEEY-UHFFFAOYSA-L; InChI=1/2K.H2O8S2/c;;1-9(2,3)7-8-10(4,5)6/h;;(H,1,2,3)(H,4,5,6)/q2*+1;/p-2 Key: USHAGKDGDHPEEY-NUQVWONBAA
- SMILES: [O-]S(=O)(=O)OOS(=O)(=O)[O-].[K+].[K+]

Properties
| Chemical formula | K_{2}S_{2}O_{8} |
| Molar mass | 270.322 g/mol |
| Appearance | white powder |
| Odor | odorless |
| Density | 2.477 g/cm^{3} |
| Melting point | < 100 °C (212 °F; 373 K) (decomposes) |
| Solubility in water | 1.75 g/100 mL (0 °C); 4.49 g/100 mL (20 °C) |
| Solubility | insoluble in alcohol |
| Refractive index (n_{D}) | 1.467 |

Structure
| Crystal structure | triclinic |

Hazards
- GHS labelling
| Pictograms | (GHS03: Oxidizing) (GHS07: Exclamation mark) (GHS08: Health hazard) |
| Signal word | Danger |
| Hazard statements | H272, H302, H315, H317, H319, H334, H335, H371 |
| Precautionary statements | P220, P261, P280, P305+P351+P338, P342+P311 |
| NFPA 704 (fire diamond) | 2 0 1 OX |
| Flash point | Non-flammable |
- Lethal dose or concentration (LD, LC)
| LD_{50} (median dose) | 802 mg/kg (oral, rat) |
| Safety data sheet (SDS) | ICSC 1133 |

Related compounds
| Other anions | Potassium sulfite Potassium sulfate Potassium peroxymonosulfate |
| Other cations | Sodium persulfate Ammonium persulfate |
- Except where otherwise noted, data are given for materials in their standard state (at 25 °C [77 °F], 100 kPa). verify (what is ?) Infobox references

Potassium persulfate is the inorganic compound with the formula K_{2}S_{2}O_{8}. Also known as potassium peroxydisulfate, it is a white solid that is sparingly soluble in cold water, but dissolves better in warm water. This salt is a powerful oxidant, commonly used to initiate polymerizations.

== Structure ==
The sodium and potassium salts are very similar. In the potassium salt, the O-O distance is 1.495 Å. The individual sulfate groups are tetrahedral, with three short S-O distances near 1.43 and one long S-O bond at 1.65 Å.

== Preparation ==
Potassium persulfate can be prepared by electrolysis of a cold solution potassium bisulfate in sulfuric acid at a high current density.

2 KHSO_{4} → K_{2}S_{2}O_{8} + H_{2}

It can also be prepared by adding potassium bisulfate (KHSO_{4}) to a solution of the more soluble salt ammonium peroxydisulfate (NH_{4})_{2}S_{2}O_{8}. Several million kilograms of the ammonium, sodium, and potassium salts of peroxydisulfate are produced annually.

== Uses ==
This salt is used to initiate polymerization of various alkenes leading to commercially important polymers such as styrene-butadiene rubber and polytetrafluoroethylene and related materials. In solution, the dianion dissociates to give radicals:

[O_{3}SO-OSO_{3}]^{2−} ⇌ 2 [SO_{4}]^{•−}

It is used in organic chemistry as an oxidizing agent, for instance in the Elbs persulfate oxidation of phenols and the Boyland–Sims oxidation of anilines.

As a strong yet stable bleaching agent it also finds use in various hair bleaches and lighteners. Such brief and non-continuous use is normally hazard free, however prolonged contact can cause skin irritation. It has been used as an improving agent for flour with the E number E922, although it is no longer approved for this use within the EU.

== Precautions ==
The salt is a strong oxidant and is incompatible with organic compounds. Prolonged skin contact can result in irritation.
