= Aziridines =

Functional group made of a carbon-carbon-nitrogen heterocycle

Mitomycin C, an aziridine, is used as a chemotherapeutic agent by virtue of its antitumour activity.

In organic chemistry, aziridines (also sometimes called ethyleneimines) are organic compounds containing the aziridine functional group (chemical structure (R−)_{4}C_{2}N−R), a three-membered heterocycle with one amine (>NR) and two methylene bridges (>CR_{2}). The parent compound is aziridine (or ethylene imine), with molecular formula C_{2}H_{4}NH. Several drugs feature aziridine rings, including zoldonrasib, thiotepa, mitomycin C, porfiromycin, and azinomycin B (carzinophilin).

== Structure ==
The bond angles in aziridine are approximately 60°, considerably less than the normal hydrocarbon bond angle of 109.5°, which results in angle strain as in the comparable cyclopropane and ethylene oxide molecules. A banana bond model explains bonding in such compounds. Aziridine is less basic than acyclic aliphatic amines, with a pKa of 7.9 for the conjugate acid, due to increased s character of the nitrogen free electron pair. Angle strain in aziridine also increases the barrier to nitrogen inversion. This barrier height permits the isolation of separate invertomers, for example the cis and trans invertomers of N-chloro-2-methylaziridine.

== Synthesis ==
Several routes have been developed to synthesize aziridines (aziridination).

Besides the specialized reactions listed below, the Johnson-Corey-Chaykovsky reaction also gives aziridines from an imine. A similar reaction with thianthrene S-oxide gives aziridines from nearly arbitrary alkenes and amines.

=== Vicinal cyclization ===
==== Haloamines, aminoalcohols and azidoalcohols ====
The amine functional group in vicinal haloamines spontaneously displaces the adjacent halide to generate an aziridine. The reaction is an intramolecular nucleophilic substitution, similar to the base-induced cyclization of halohydrins to epoxides. With appropriate activating agents, vicinal cyclization is similarly possible with aminoalcohols, themselves efficiently produced from opening epoxides with amines.

The parent aziridine is produced industrially from aminoethanol via two related routes. The Nippon Shokubai process requires an oxide catalyst and high temperatures to effect the dehydration. In the Wenker synthesis, the aminoethanol is converted to the sulfate ester, which undergoes base-induced sulfate elimination.

In the laboratory, aminoalcohols can be induced to cyclize with the Mitsunobu reaction, but Mitsunobu conditions more fruitfully apply to 2-azido alcohols. In a variant on the aza-Wittig reaction, trialkyl phosphines such as trimethylphosphine or tributylphosphine reduce azidoalcohols to an α‑alcohol phosphine imide, which then cyclizes to an aziridine.

In the Blum-Ittah aziridine synthesis, the initial azidoalcohol forms when sodium azide opens an epoxide:

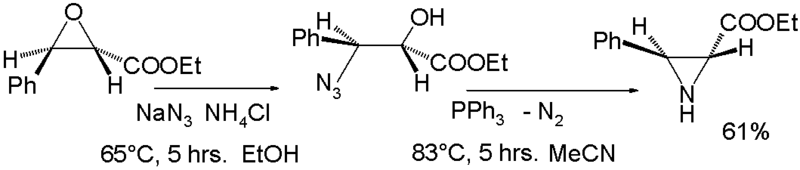
Aziridine synthesis Hili 2006

==== Darzens-like reactions ====
The De Kimpe aziridine synthesis allows for the generation of aziridines by reacting an α-chloroimine with a nucleophile, such as hydride, cyanide, or a Grignard reagent.

The Hoch-Campbell ethylenimine synthesis involves the reaction of certain oximes with Grignard reagents, which affords aziridines:

Hoch-Campbell Ethylenimine Synthesis

=== Nitrene addition and triazoline contraction ===
Nitrene addition to alkenes is a well-established method for the synthesis of aziridines, and occurs for a wide variety of nitrenoid precursors.

Nitrenes (as iminoiodinane nitrenoids) can be prepared in situ when iodosobenzene diacetate oxidizes various amides, or from deprotonation of an aminoester:

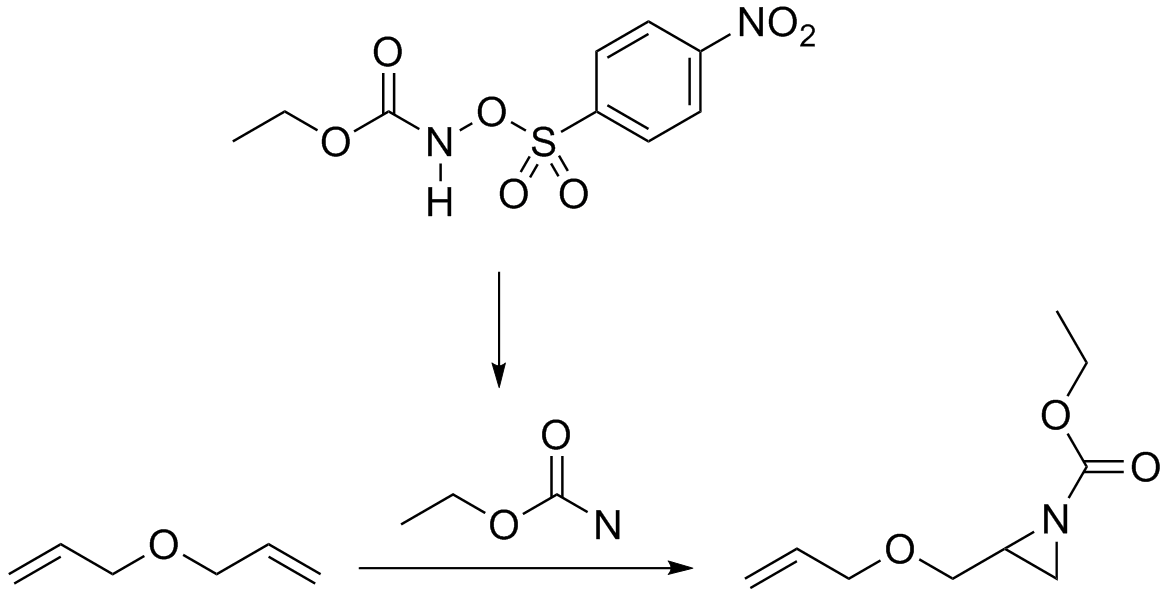
Nitrene addition

Rhodium(II) carboxylates catalyze nitrene formation from O-(2,4-dinitrophenyl)hydroxylamine (DPH), which then aziridates a mono-, di-, tri- or tetra-substituted alkene (olefin):

alkene + DPH $\ce{->[\ce{Rh2(CO2R)4}]}$ aziridine

Alternatively, photolysis or thermolysis of organic azides are good ways to generate nitrenes. The same conditions also contract triazolines, expelling nitrogen and producing an aziridine.

== Reactions ==
=== Nucleophilic ring opening ===
Aziridines are reactive substrates in ring-opening reactions with many nucleophiles due to their ring strain. Alcoholysis and aminolysis are basically the reverse reactions of the cyclizations. Carbon nucleophiles such as organolithium reagents and organocuprates are also effective.

One application of a ring-opening reaction in asymmetric synthesis is that of trimethylsilylazide TMSN_{3} with an asymmetric ligand in scheme 2 in an organic synthesis of oseltamivir:

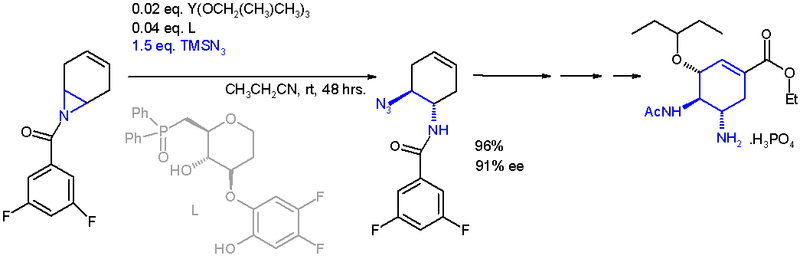
Synthesis of Tamiflu via a Catalytic Asymmetric Ring-Opening of meso-Aziridines with TMSN3

=== 1,3-dipole formation ===
Certain N-substituted azirines with electron withdrawing groups on both carbons form azomethine ylides in an electrocyclic thermal or photochemical ring-opening reaction. These ylides can be trapped with a suitable dipolarophile in a 1,3-dipolar cycloaddition.

When the N-substituent is an electron-withdrawing group such as a tosyl group, the carbon-nitrogen bond breaks, forming another zwitterion TsN^{−}–CH_{2}–CH^{+}_{2}–R

This reaction type requires a Lewis acid catalyst such as boron trifluoride. In this way 2-phenyl-N-tosylaziridine reacts with alkynes, nitriles, ketones and alkenes. Certain 1,4-dipoles form from azetidines.

=== Other ===
Lewis acids, such as B(C_{6}F_{5})_{3}, can induce decomposition of the ring to a carbocation and linear azanide, which then attack unsaturated moieties in tandem. Oxidation to the N-oxide instead induces nitroso compound extrusion, leaving an olefin.

== Safety ==
As electrophiles, aziridines are subject to attack and ring-opening by endogenous nucleophiles such as nitrogenous bases in DNA base pairs, resulting in potential mutagenicity.

The International Agency for Research on Cancer (IARC) classifies aziridine compounds as possibly carcinogenic to humans (IARC Group 2B). In making the overall evaluation, the IARC Working Group took into consideration that aziridine is a direct-acting alkylating agent, which is mutagenic in a wide range of test systems and forms DNA adducts that are promutagenic. The features that are responsible for their mutagenicity are relevant to their beneficial medicinal properties.

== See also ==
- Binary ethylenimine, a dimeric form of aziridine
