= Episulfide =

Organic compounds with a saturated carbon-carbon-sulfur ring

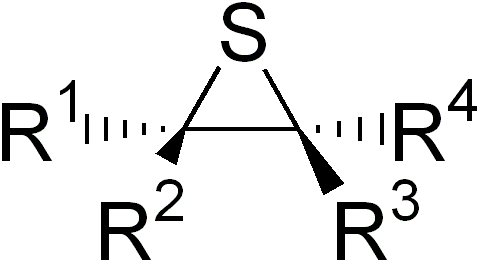
General structure of an episulfide

In organic chemistry, an episulfide (also known as a thiirane, olefin sulfide, thioalkylene oxide, or thiacyclopropane) is an organic compound that contains a saturated, heterocyclic ring consisting of two carbon atoms and one sulfur atom. It is the sulfur analogue of an epoxide or aziridine. Episulfides are less common and generally less stable than epoxides. The most common derivative is ethylene sulfide (C_{2}H_{4}S).

== Structure ==
According to electron diffraction, the C−C and C−S distances in ethylene sulfide are respectively 1.473 and 1.811 Å. The C−C−S and C−S−C angles are respectively 66.0 and 48.0°.

== Preparation ==
A number of chemists in the early 1900s, including Staudinger and Pfenninger (1916), as well as Delepine (1920) studied episulfides. In 1934 Dachlauer and Jackel devised a general synthesis of episulfides from epoxides using alkali thiocyanates and thiourea.

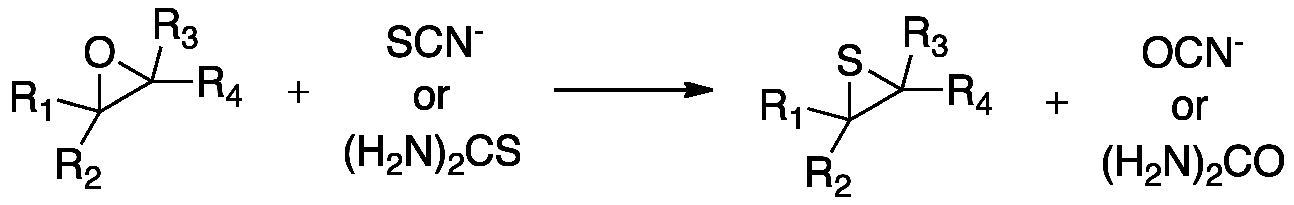

Episulfides can also be prepared from cyclic carbonates, hydroxyalkylthiols, halohydrins, dihaloalkanes, and chloroalkylthiols. For example, the reaction of ethylene carbonate and KSCN gives ethylene sulfide:

KSCN + C_{2}H_{4}O_{2}CO → KOCN + C_{2}H_{4}S + CO_{2}

Base converts monothiocarbonates to episulfides:

RC_{2}H_{3}OSCO → RC_{2}H_{3}S + CO_{2}

The metal-catalyzed reaction of sulfur with alkenes has been demonstrated but is of little preparative value. Tertiary episulfonium ions form when a trinitrophenylsulfonate thioester, or a mercaptonium trimer of the form (RS)^{+}_{3}, attacks an alkene. Note that the products are however still rather unstable.

Tetrasubstituted thiiranes form spontaneously from the corresponding thiocarbonyl ylide.

Succinimide- or pthalimide sulfenyl chlorides react with alkenes to form α-chloro sulfenyl amides. Further reaction with lithium aluminum hydride gives the episulfide.

== Reactions ==
Episulfides, due to their innate ring strain, often undergo ring-opening reactions, especially with nucleophiles. For terminal episulfides, nucleophiles attack the primary carbon:

R_{2}C(S)CH_{2} + NuH → R_{2}CHCH_{2}SNu

Nucleophiles include hydrides, thiolates, alkoxides, amines, and carbanions.

Like ordinary thioethers, episulfides can be oxidized to sulfoxides as in the synthesis of ethylene episulfoxide:

R_{2}C(S)CH_{2} + H_{2}O_{2} → R_{2}C(SO)CH_{2} + H_{2}O

In a related reactivity, episulfides are easily S-alkylated. With methyl bromide, the product is the ring-opened thioether:

R_{2}C(S)CH_{2} + R'Br → R_{2}C(Br)CH_{2}SR'

Such reactions proceed via episulfonium ions. Episulfonium salts can be prepared using trimethyloxonium tetrafluoroborate:

R_{2}C(S)CH_{2} + (CH_{3})_{3}OBF_{4} → [R_{2}C(SCH_{3})CH_{2}]BF_{4} + (CH_{3})_{2}O

Episulfide polymerize, especially in the presence of Lewis acids.

== Applications ==
Epitiostanol, an episulfide-containing drug for the treatment of breast cancer.

Thiiranes occur rarely in nature but are found in some pharmaceuticals.

They are intermediate in the action of sulfur mustards, a family of chemical weapons.

== Related compounds ==
Dithiiranes consist of three-membered ring containing two sulfur atoms and one carbon. One example was prepared by oxidation of a 1,3-dithietane.

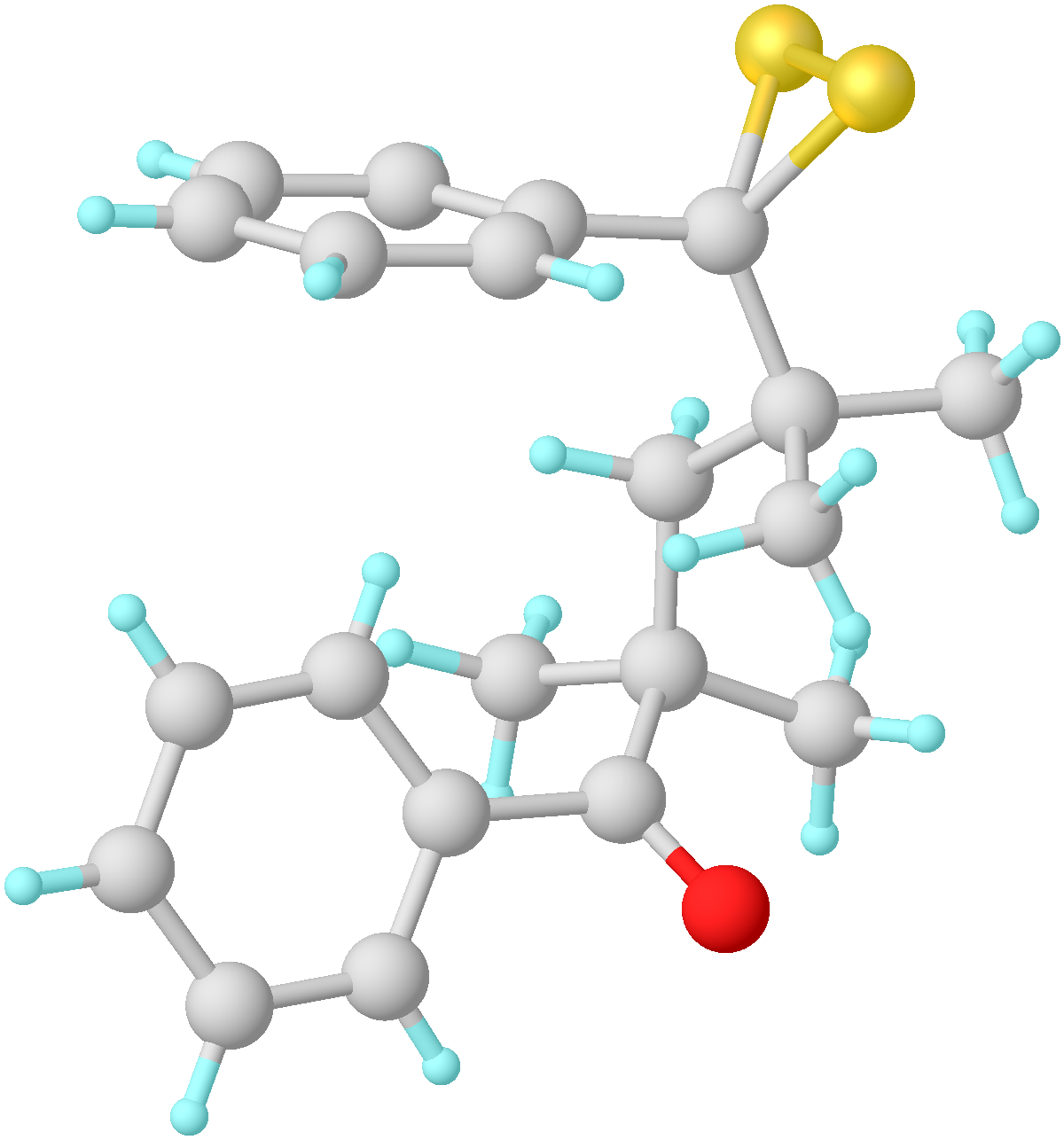
Structure of a dithiirane.

Thiirenes are unsaturated episulfides, the parent having the formula C_{2}H_{2}S formally derived by the formal addition of sulfur atom to an alkyne. They are antiaromatic and rarely observed. S-Alkylthiirenium salts are, however, known.
