= Hyperbranched aminosilica =

Hyperbranched aminosilica is a white powdery substance. The compound, also referred to as HAS can capture and keep CO_{2} gas due to its branch-like properties that enable amino sites at the tips of the branches to collect the gas. It is made from aziridine and mesoporous silica.
