= C2H4OS =

The molecular formula C_{2}H_{4}OS (molar mass: 76.11 g/mol, exact mass: 75.9983 u) may refer to:

- Ethylene episulfoxide
- Thioacetic acid
