= C2H7NO =

C_{2}H_{7}NO may refer to:

- 1-Aminoethanol, an organic compound with the formula CH_{3}CH(NH_{2})OH
- N,O-Dimethylhydroxylamine, a methylated hydroxylamine commercially available as its hydrochloride salt
- Ethanolamine, an organic chemical compound with the formula HOCH_{2}CH_{2}NH_{2}
