= IUPAC nomenclature of chemistry =

Systematic rules for naming chemical compounds and chemistry concepts

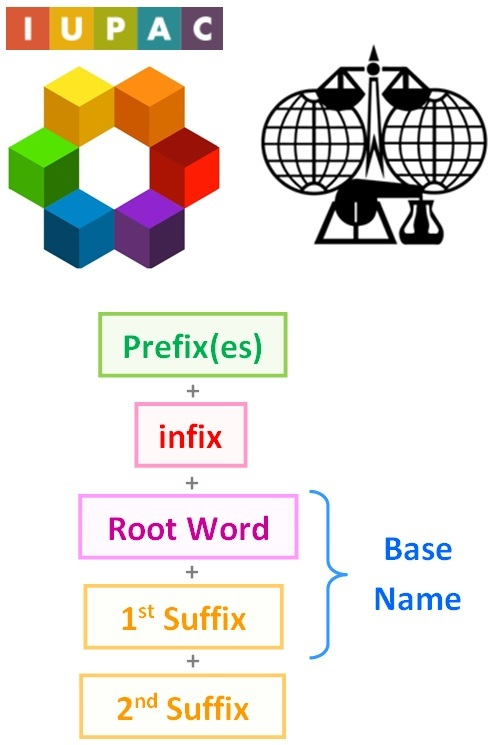
The main structure of chemical names according to IUPAC nomenclature.

IUPAC nomenclature is a set of recommendations for naming chemical compounds and for describing chemistry and biochemistry in general. The International Union of Pure and Applied Chemistry (IUPAC) is the international authority on chemical nomenclature and terminology.

== History of the Standardisation of Nomenclature ==
In 1787, Louis-Bernard Guyton de Morveau published his nomenclature recommendations in collaboration with fellow French chemists Berthollet, de Fourcroy and Lavoisier.

This work however covered only what are now called inorganic compounds. With the expansion of organic chemistry in the 19th century, and a greater understanding of the structure of organic compounds, the need for a more global standardised nomenclature became more prominent. Following a series of meetings, the first of which was established in 1860 by August Kekulé, the Geneva Nomenclature of 1892 was created.

Another entity called the International Association of Chemical Societies (IACS) existed, and on 1911, gave vital propositions the new organising body should address. These propositions included:

- Nomenclature of inorganic and organic chemistry,
- Standardization of atomic weights,
- Standardization of physical constants,
- Editing tables of properties of matter,
- Establishing a commission for the review of work,
- Standardization of the formats of publications,
- Measures required to prevent repetition of the same pap.

The same entity also established a commission in 1913 but its work was interrupted by the start of World War I.

In 1919, after the end of the first world war, a group of chemists created the International Union of Pure and Applied Chemistry (IUPAC) with this idea of standardising and expanding nomenclature as well as unionising scientists and strengthening the international trade of science. In 1921 they appointed commissions for nomenclature in organic, inorganic, and biochemistry. In 2019 IUPAC celebrated its 100th anniversary.

== Use ==
IUPAC states that, "As one of its major activities, IUPAC develops Recommendations to establish unambiguous, uniform, and consistent nomenclature and terminology for specific scientific fields, usually presented as: glossaries of terms for specific chemical disciplines; definitions of terms relating to a group of properties; nomenclature of chemical compounds and their classes; terminology, symbols, and units in a specific field; classifications and uses of terms in a specific field; and conventions and standards of practice for presenting data in a specific field." Recommendations are published in IUPAC's journal, Pure and Applied Chemistry (PAC), the publicly available IUPAC Standards Online database, IUPAC Color Books, and other publications. PAC journal issues are freely available the year following publication.

The two IUPAC bodies that lead nomenclature and terminology efforts are Division VIII – Chemical Nomenclature and Structure Representation and the Interdivisional Committee on Terminology, Nomenclature, and Symbols.

== Nomenclature of inorganic chemistry ==
The International Union of Pure and Applied Chemistry (IUPAC) has established a standardized system for naming inorganic compounds. These rules are published in a series of books collectively known as Nomenclature of Inorganic Chemistry, commonly referred to as the "Red Book.".

== Nomenclature of organic chemistry ==
=== Substitutive nomenclature ===
Substitutive nomenclature is the most important and widely used system. It is based on naming a principal functional group, which is added as a prefix or suffix to the name of the carbon skeleton. One of the hydrogen atoms in the carbon skeleton is replaced by the functional group — hence the principle of substitution.

When multiple functional groups are present, one is designated as the principal group and is expressed as a suffix. The main group is selected according to a priority list established by IUPAC. The remaining groups are treated as prefixes and are attached to the name of the main carbon chain. The selection of the main carbon chain follows a series of strict rules applied sequentially until a single, definitive chain is determined.

=== Radicofunctional nomenclature ===
This system is based on naming functional classes as the main group (without suffixes), while the remainder of the molecule is treated as one or more radicals.

=== Additive nomenclature ===
In additive nomenclature, the name is derived from a parent structure to which one or more atoms have been added. This approach is commonly used for hydrogen addition, indicated by the prefix hydro.

=== Subtractive nomenclature ===
Subtractive nomenclature is the reverse of additive nomenclature. It uses the name of a parent structure from which one or more atoms have been removed. This system is mainly applied to hydrogen removal, indicated by the prefix dehydro. The complete replacement of all methyl groups on a ring with hydrogen atoms is indicated by the prefix nor. This system is primarily used in the nomenclature of natural products.

=== Replacement nomenclature ===
Replacement nomenclature allows for the specification of a carbon chain and the positions at which carbon atoms are replaced by other atoms—unlike substitutive nomenclature (described above), which specifies the replacement of hydrogen atoms.

According to IUPAC rules, this nomenclature system is permitted “if it allows for a significant simplification” of the systematic name. This is often the case when describing well-defined polyethylene glycols (PEGs).

== Typographic rules ==
IUPAC nomenclature is accompanied by typographic conventions. A summary of key rules is provided below.

- Capital letters: Common chemical names are written in lowercase: halomon, manzamine A. Trademarked or commercial names use capital letters and must include the appropriate trademark symbol (® or ™): Tylenol®, Aspirin™. If a name appears at the beginning of a sentence or in a title, it should be capitalized regardless of its typographic convention.
- Italics: Foreign phrases are typically italicized (or written in roman type if they already appear in italics): tert-butyl chloride. However, many English-language chemistry journals discourage this practice. Italics are also used for:
  - Lowercase letters in ring fusions: thieno[3,2-b]furan
  - The letters o, m, and p when used for ortho, meta, and para
  - Element symbols indicating substitution sites: N-benzyl, O-acetyl, etc.
  - The symbol H when it marks the position of a hydrogen atom: 3H-pyrrole
  - Structural and stereochemical descriptors: sec, tert, cis, trans, r, c, t, R, S, R⁎, S⁎, rel, Z, E, abeo, retro. (Note: iso, cyclo, homo, nor, and seco are not italicized.)
- Sugars: The D and L stereodescriptors are typically written in a font size 2 points smaller than the rest of the text: 1-O-acetyl-D-glucose.
- (+) and (−) signs: The minus sign (−) used in stereochemical descriptors should be an en dash (–), not a hyphen (-), to ensure typographic balance with the plus sign: (−)-tartrate
- Vowel elision: Systematic names can lead to double vowels such as aa or ao. IUPAC rule R-0.1.7 addresses these cases. The following is a simplified summary:
  - Elision of a occurs:
    - When followed by a vowel in heterocyclic names: tetrazole
    - When followed by a or o in multiplicative prefixes: pentaoxyde → pentoxyde, tetraol → tetrol
  - Elision does not occur in replacement nomenclature: 1,4,7,10-tetraoxaundecane
- Punctuation:
  - No spaces are used between affixes or after commas separating locants: 2-bromooctane, N-nitrosourea
  - No space or hyphen is placed between the final prefix and the name of the parent alkane: N-nitrosourea
  - In polycyclic compounds, locants inside brackets are separated by periods (not commas), and no spaces are placed around the brackets: 1,8-diazabicyclo[5.4.0]undec-7-ene
  - For heterocycles, locants for heteroatoms use commas, and brackets may be separated from the rest of the name by spaces or hyphens:[1,3,2]oxazaphosphepane or 1,3,2-oxazaphosphepane

=== Capitalization ===
Capitalizing the first letter or the entirety of a systematic chemical name follows a few straightforward rules. Prefixes such as sec, tert, ortho, meta, para, α, β, D, L, (+), (−), (R), (S), or locants are not considered part of the main name. Therefore, it is the first letter of the main part of the name that should be capitalized, if needed. Some prefixes, especially those never italicized, such as cyclo, iso, neo, or spiro, are considered part of the main name and should be capitalized accordingly.

Examples:

- 2-aminoethanol must be written at the beginning of a sentence as "2-Aminoethanol", because the main part of the name (excluding the locant) is aminoethanol.
- N,N-diisopropylethylamine becomes "N,N-Diisopropylethylamine" for the same reason. The locants (N) remain capitalized and italicized.
- isopropanol becomes "Isopropanol", not isoPropanol, because "iso" is part of the main name.

=== Alphabetical order for chemical names ===
Following the capitalization rules, chemical names are alphabetized based on the main part of the name, not on prefixes or locants. This means indexing and alphabetical sorting should ignore non-essential prefixes and focus on the core name — i.e., the part that would be capitalized at the beginning of a sentence.

This approach became necessary when chemical literature began including indexes. For example, the molecule butanol should consistently be sorted under B—not under 1 (for 1-butanol) or N (for n-butanol).

== See also ==
- Preferred IUPAC name
- IUPAC books
