= De Kimpe aziridine synthesis =

Chemical reaction

Named after	Norbert De Kimpe
Reaction type	Ring forming reaction

Identifiers
Organic Chemistry Portal	de-kimpe-aziridine-synthesis

The De Kimpe aziridine synthesis is a name reaction of organic chemistry, for the generation of aziridines by the reaction of α-chloroimines with nucleophiles such as hydride, cyanide, or Grignard reagents.

The De Kimpe aziridine synthesis is suitable for both aldimines and ketimines, particularly those with two alkyl substituents on the α-carbon (Thorpe-Ingold effect).

== Mechanism ==
The nucleophile attacks the imino carbon atom, forming a tetrahedral intermediate. The intermediate then undergoes an intramolecular nucleophilic substitution, with the negatively charged nitrogen atom attacking the α-carbon and having the chloride anion as the leaving group.
