= Anprolene =

Ethylene oxide trade name

Anprolene is a registered trade name for ethylene oxide that belongs to Andersen Sterilizers.

Harold Willids Andersen invented Anprolene in 1967 and used plastic bags and small ampoules, hence, substantially less ethylene oxide (EtO) than traditional chamber type sterilizers which employ tanks of EtO. The "gas diffusion" method of using ethylene oxide was particularly useful to Andersen whose invention of the first double lumen nasogastric tube was being used by his colleagues at Bellevue Hospital in New York, NY, where he was chief resident. At that time a single lumen Levin tube was employed clean and packaged, but not sterile. Andersen recognized the need and the Andersen Tube was packaged and sterilized with ethylene oxide. The US EPA registered Anprolene in 1968. Another gas diffusion method, Sterijet, was invented and used to sterilize Andersen Tubes and other medical devices.

On February 8, 2013 Anprolene and Sterijet were recognized by the FDA Office of Compliance as pre-amendment devices which is a reference to the Medical Device Amendments of 1976.

Plastic, latex and rubber, and the like are "porous" to Ethylene oxide so that EO or EtO diffuses through a series of bags containing a specific quantity of gas. The bag containing the items for sterilization concentrates the gas for enough time which is why it is called a unit-dose gas diffusion method. Each sterilization cycle uses less than 18g of 100% EtO, hence economic value is gained when every corner of a traditional EtO chamber type sterilizer that relies on tanks containing pounds of EO need not be filled.

Andersen's unit-dose, gas diffusion method is widely used where small quantities of goods require sterilization. The Ethylene Oxide flexible chamber technology is also called EO-FCT. The human, veterinary and industrial markets are beneficiaries of EO-FCT.
