= Borirane =

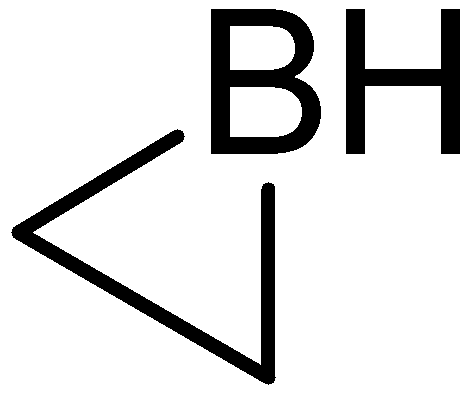
Skeletal formula of borirane
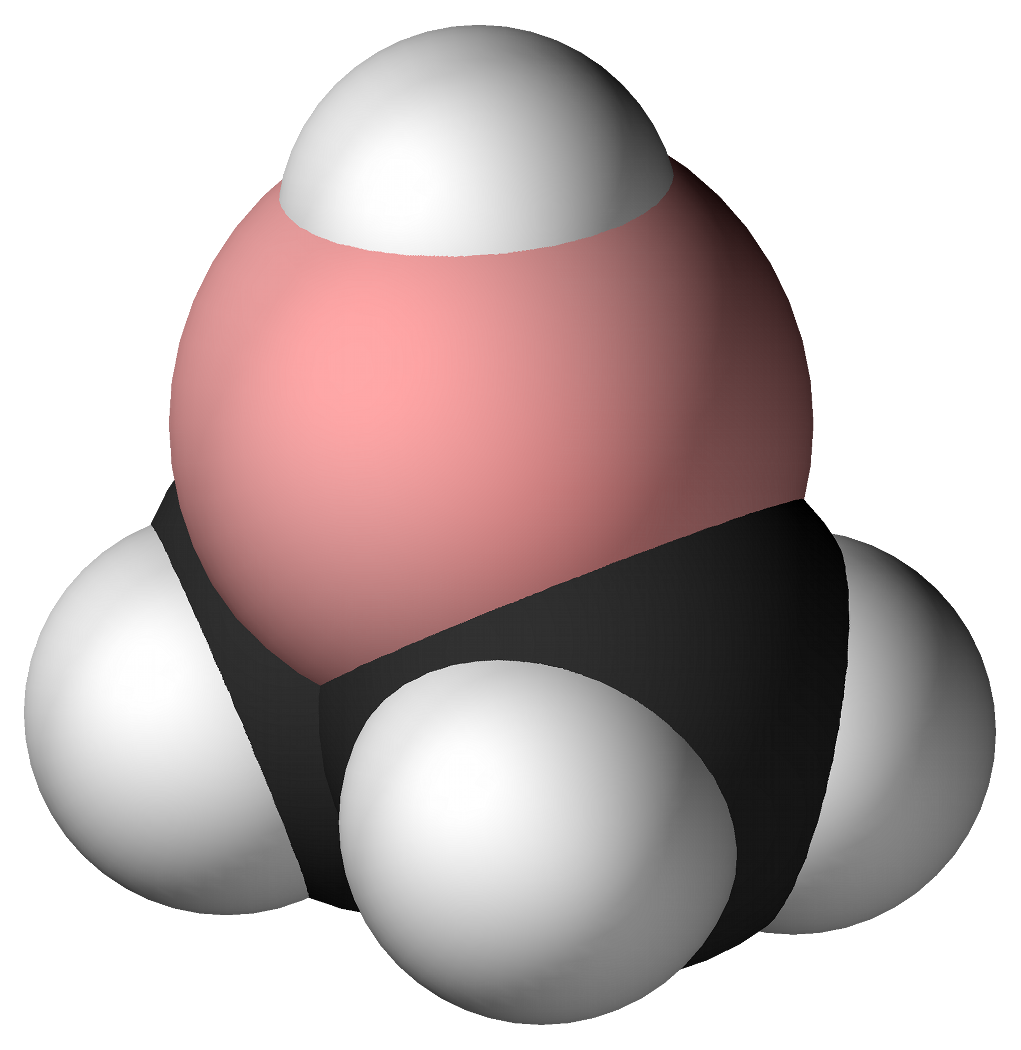
Space-filling model of borirane

Identifiers
CAS Number	39517-80-1
3D model (JSmol)	Interactive image
ChemSpider	14566055
PubChem CID	18426477 confused with radical
CompTox Dashboard (EPA)	DTXSID80593667
- InChI: InChI=1S/C2H5B/c1-2-3-1/h3H,1-2H2 Key: OGVHYCXTHGZYKN-UHFFFAOYSA-N; InChI=1/C2H5B/c1-2-3-1/h3H,1-2H2
- SMILES: B1CC1

Properties
Chemical formula	BC_{2}H_{5}
Molar mass	39.872 g mol^{−1}
Melting point	−129 °C (−200 °F; 144 K)
Boiling point	−24 °C (−11 °F; 249 K)
Solubility in water	15.425 g dm^{−3}

Related compounds
Related heterocycles	Aziridine; Ethylene oxide Thiirane
- Except where otherwise noted, data are given for materials in their standard state (at 25 °C [77 °F], 100 kPa). verify (what is ?) Infobox references

Borirane is a heterocyclic organic compound with the formula C_{2}H_{4}BH. This colourless, flammable gas is the simplest borirane, a three-membered ring consisting of two carbon and one boron atom. It can be viewed as a structural analog of aziridine, with boron replacing the nitrogen atom of aziridine. Borirane is isomeric with ethylideneborane.

This compound has five isomers.
