= Blum–Ittah aziridine synthesis =

Chemical reaction

Named after	Jochanan Blum; Ytzhak Ittah
Reaction type	Ring forming reaction

The Blum–Ittah aziridine synthesis, also known as the Blum–Ittah-Shahak aziridine synthesis or simply the Blum aziridine synthesis is a name reaction of organic chemistry, for the generation of aziridines from oxiranes.

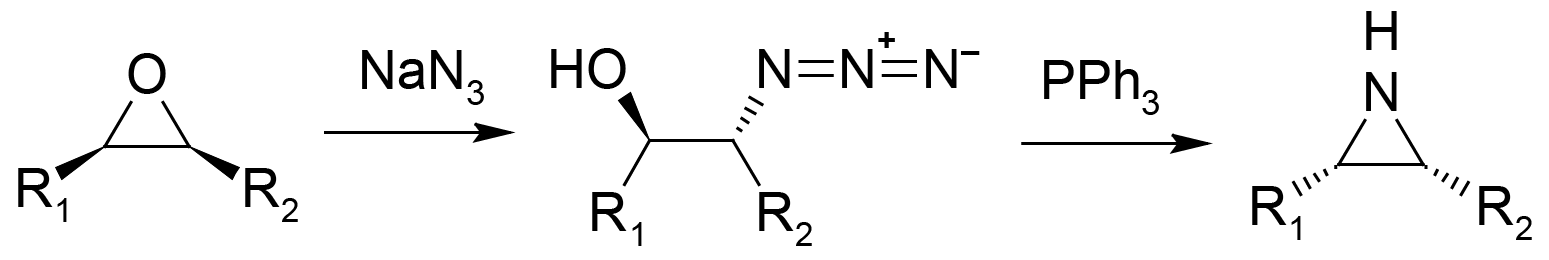

== Mechanism ==
The oxirane is first converted into a 2-azidoalcohol with the use of an azide such as sodium azide. The azido alcohol is then reduced with the use of a trialkylphosphine such as triphenylphosphine in a manner similar to the Staudinger reaction, concomitant with loss of N_{2}. The resulting phosphanimine (formerly called iminophosphorane) intermediate is then attacked by the alcohol, with oxygen forming a bond with the phosphorus atom. Forming a ring intermediate. After a proton transfer, a pair of electrons from the oxygen atom shifts onto the phosphorus atom, and the phosphorus-nitrogen bond breaks, with the electron pair shifting onto the nitrogen atom. The negatively charged nitrogen atom attacks the carbon atom that the oxygen atom is connected to. This gives us our desired aziridine and a trialkylphosphine oxide as a side product.

== Applications ==
The Blum-Ittah aziridine synthesis has been used in the synthesis of α-methylserine and 6-Azabicyclo[3.2.1]octanes.
