= Thiirane =

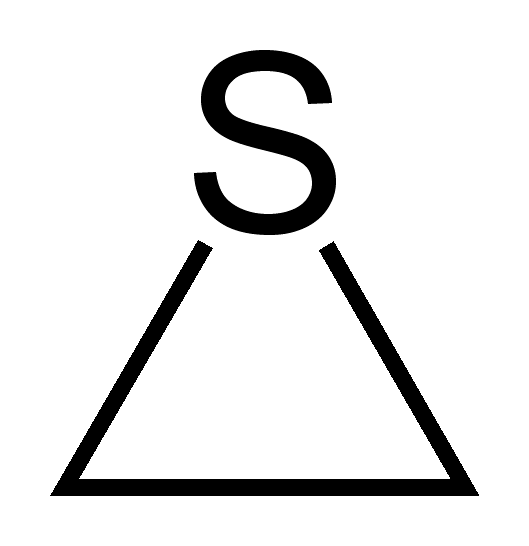
Structural formula of thiirane
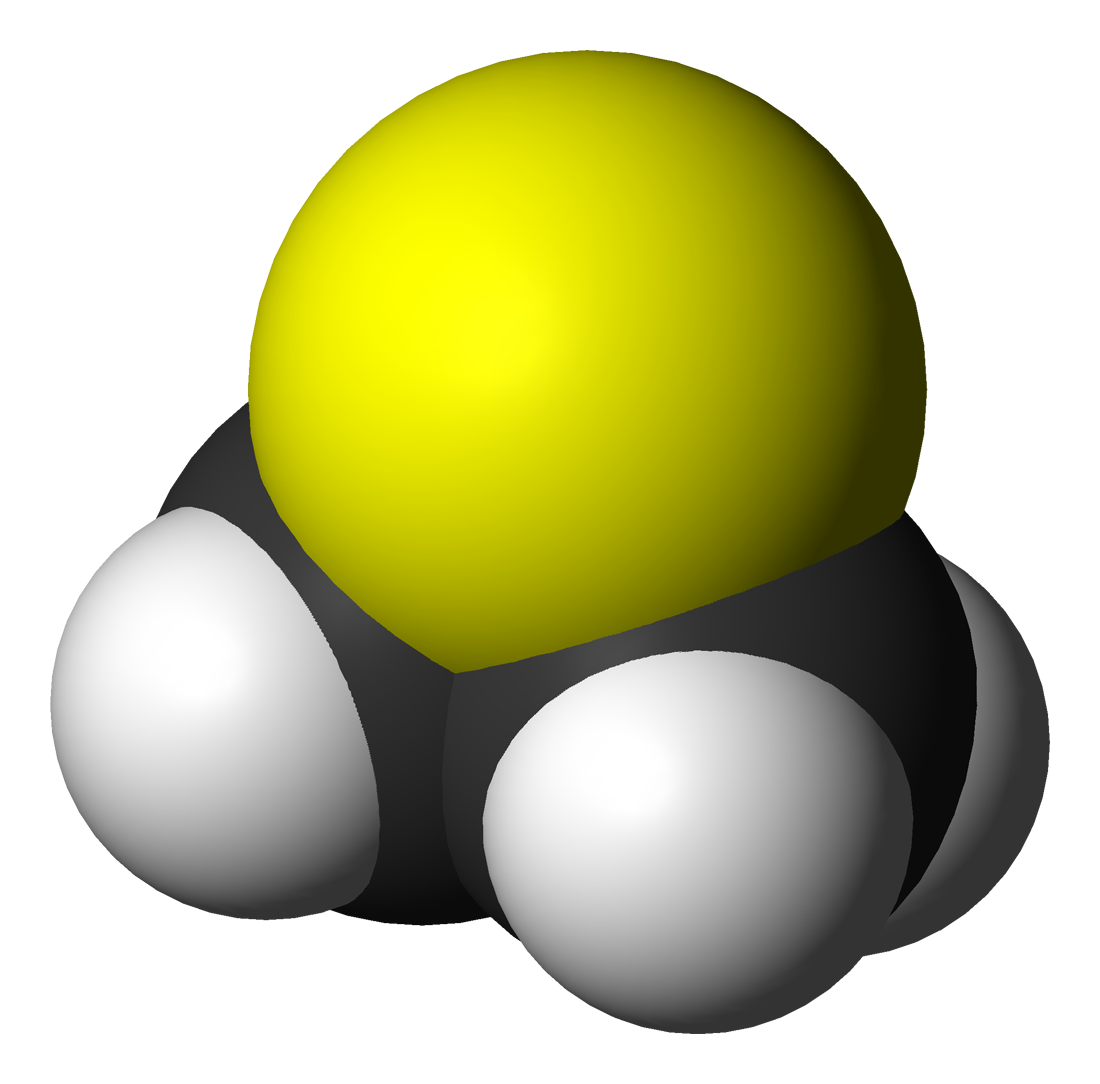
Space-filling model of thiirane
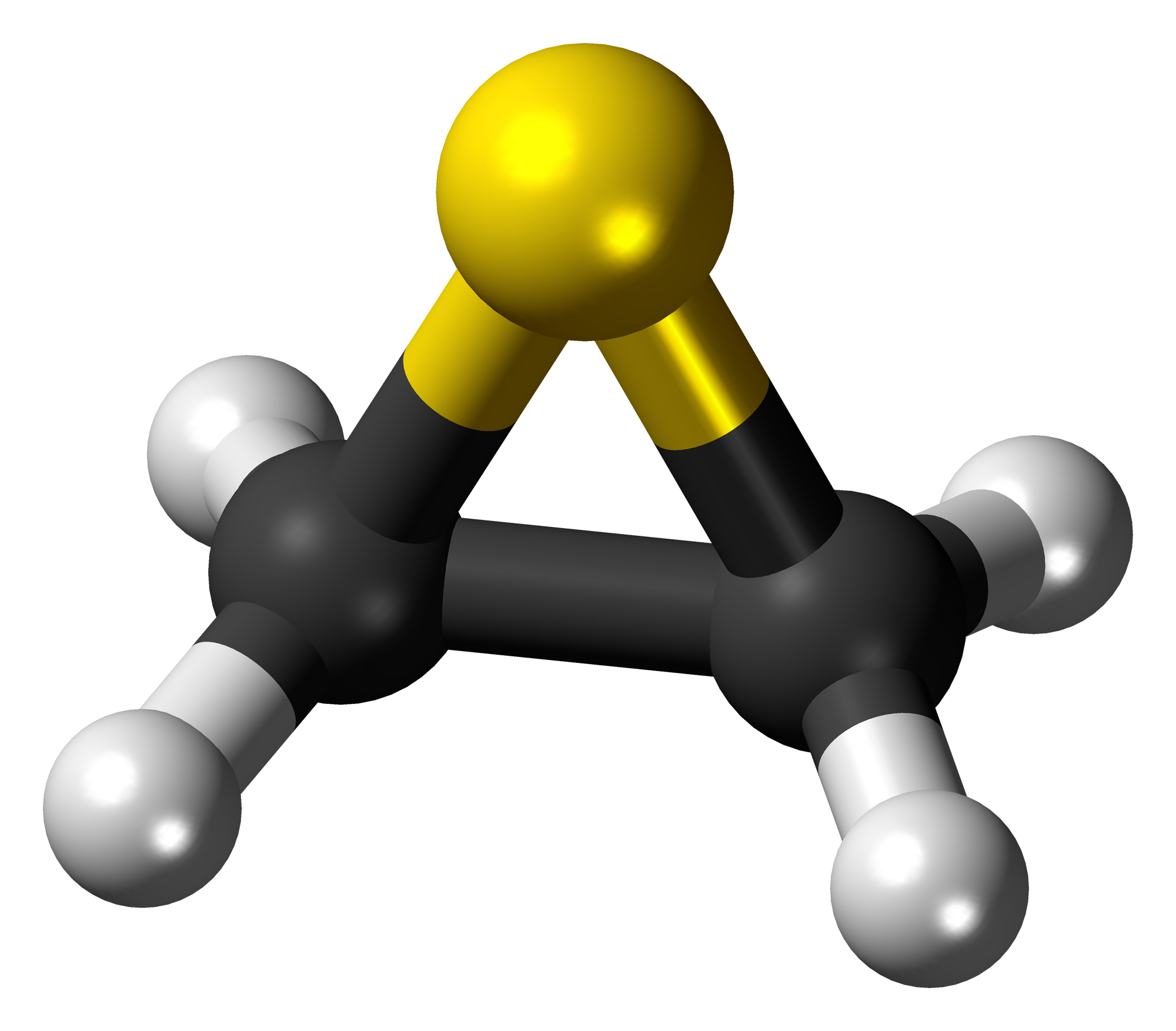
- Ball-and-stick model of thiirane

Names
- Preferred IUPAC name Thiirane
- Systematic IUPAC name Thiacyclopropane
- Other names 2,3-Dihydrothiirene; Ethylene sulfide

Identifiers
CAS Number	420-12-2
3D model (JSmol)	Interactive image
Beilstein Reference	102379
ChEBI	CHEBI:30977
ChemSpider	9481
ECHA InfoCard	100.006.359
EC Number	206-993-9
Gmelin Reference	1278
KEGG	C19419
MeSH	ethylene+sulfide
PubChem CID	9865
RTECS number	KX3500000
UNII	A2W5165740
UN number	1992
CompTox Dashboard (EPA)	DTXSID3049411
- InChI: InChI=1S/C2H4S/c1-2-3-1/h1-2H2 Key: VOVUARRWDCVURC-UHFFFAOYSA-N
- SMILES: C1CS1

Properties
Chemical formula	C_{2}H_{4}S
Molar mass	60.11 g·mol^{−1}
Appearance	Pale, yellow liquid
Odor	Sulfurous
Density	1.01 g cm^{−3}
Melting point	−109 °C (−164 °F; 164 K)
Boiling point	56 °C; 133 °F; 329 K
Vapor pressure	28.6 kPa (at 20 °C)

Thermochemistry
Std enthalpy of formation (Δ_{f}H^{⦵}_{298})	51–53 kJ mol^{−1}
Std enthalpy of combustion (Δ_{c}H^{⦵}_{298})	−2.0126 MJ mol^{−1}

Hazards
- GHS labelling
Pictograms	(GHS02: Flammable) (GHS05: Corrosive) (GHS06: Toxic)
Signal word	Danger
Hazard statements	H225, H301, H318, H331
Precautionary statements	P210, P261, P280, P301+P310, P305+P351+P338, P311
NFPA 704 (fire diamond)	3 4 2
Flash point	10 °C (50 °F; 283 K)

Related compounds
Related heterocycles	Ethylene oxide Aziridine; Borirane
- Except where otherwise noted, data are given for materials in their standard state (at 25 °C [77 °F], 100 kPa). verify (what is ?) Infobox references

Thiirane, more commonly known as ethylene sulfide, is the cyclic chemical compound with the formula C_{2}H_{4}S. It is the smallest sulfur-containing heterocycle and the simplest episulfide. Like many organosulfur compounds, this species has a highly unpleasant odour. Thiirane is also used to describe any derivative of the parent ethylene sulfide.

== Structure and properties ==
According to electron diffraction, the C-C and C-S distances in ethylene sulfide are respectively 1.473 and 1.811 Å. The C-C-S and C-S-C angles are respectively 66.0 and 48.0°. The microwave and infrared spectra were studied experimentally and computationally.

== Preparation and reactions ==
It can be prepared by the reaction of ethylene carbonate and KSCN. For this purpose the KSCN is first melted under vacuum to remove water.

KSCN + C_{2}H_{4}O_{2}CO → KOCN + C_{2}H_{4}S + CO_{2}

Ethylenesulfide adds to amines to afford 2-mercaptoethylamines, which are good chelating ligands.

C_{2}H_{4}S + R_{2}NH → R_{2}NCH_{2}CH_{2}SH

This process is often called mercaptoethylation.

Oxidation of thiirane with periodate gives ethylene episulfoxide.
