= Ethylene oxide =

Cyclic compound (C2H4O)

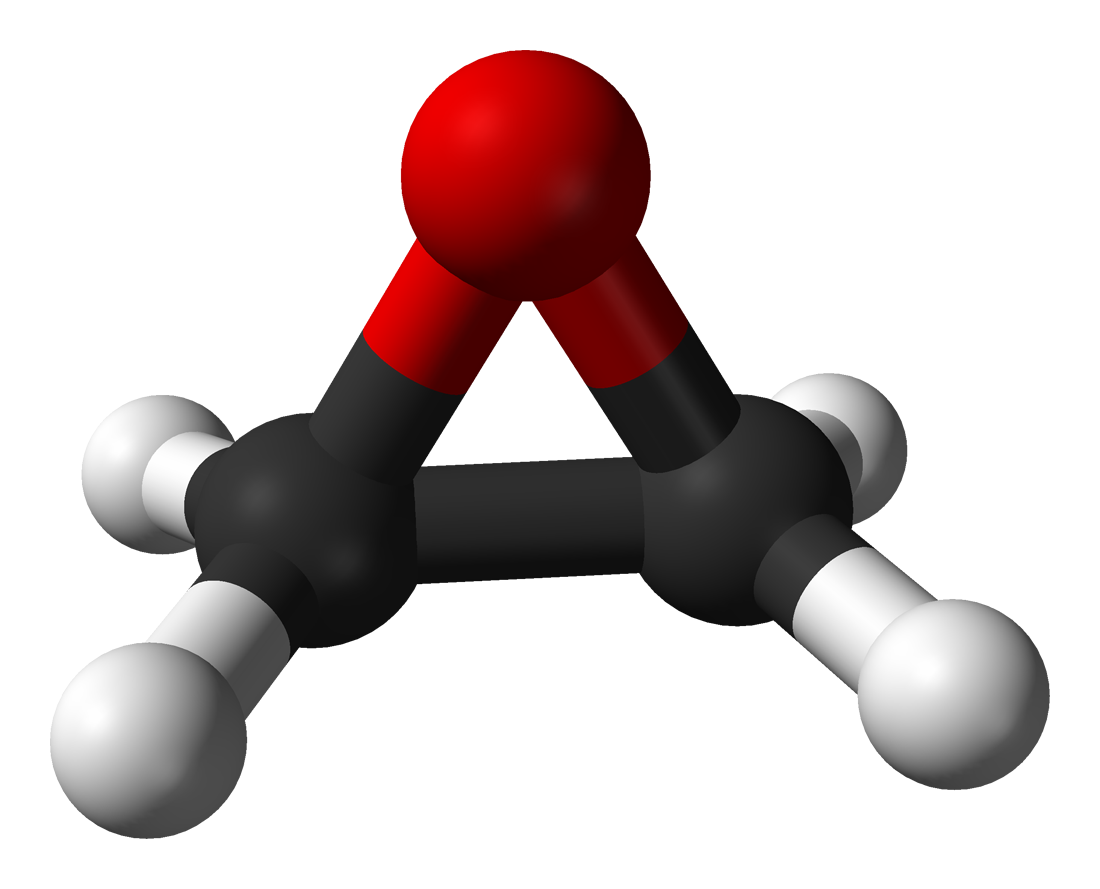

Names
- Preferred IUPAC name Oxirane
- Systematic IUPAC name Epoxyethane; Oxacyclopropane
- Other names Ethylene oxide Dimethylene oxide 1,2-Epoxyethane [3]-crown-1 Epoxide

Identifiers
CAS Number	75-21-8
3D model (JSmol)	Interactive image
Abbreviations	EO, EtO
Beilstein Reference	102378
ChEBI	CHEBI:27561
ChEMBL	ChEMBL1743219
ChemSpider	6114
ECHA InfoCard	100.000.773
EC Number	200-849-9
Gmelin Reference	676
KEGG	D03474
MeSH	Ethylene+Oxide
PubChem CID	6354
RTECS number	KX2450000
UNII	JJH7GNN18P
UN number	1040
CompTox Dashboard (EPA)	DTXSID0020600
- InChI: InChI=1S/C2H4O/c1-2-3-1/h1-2H2 Key: IAYPIBMASNFSPL-UHFFFAOYSA-N; InChI=1/C2H4O/c1-2-3-1/h1-2H2 Key: IAYPIBMASNFSPL-UHFFFAOYAX
- SMILES: O1CC1

Properties
Chemical formula	C_{2}H_{4}O
Molar mass	44.052 g·mol^{−1}
Appearance	Colorless gas
Odor	Like diethyl ether
Density	0.8821 g·cm^{−3}
Melting point	−112.46 °C (−170.43 °F; 160.69 K)
Boiling point	10.4 °C (50.7 °F; 283.5 K)
Solubility in water	Miscible
Vapor pressure	1.46 atm (20 °C)
Magnetic susceptibility (χ)	−30.5·10^{−6} cm^{3}/mol
Refractive index (n_{D})	1.3597 (589 nm)
Dipole moment	1.94 D

Thermochemistry
Heat capacity (C)	47.9 J·mol^{−1}·K^{−1}
Std molar entropy (S^{⦵}_{298})	242.5 J·mol^{−1}·K^{−1}
Std enthalpy of formation (Δ_{f}H^{⦵}_{298})	−52.6 kJ·mol^{−1}
Gibbs free energy (Δ_{f}G^{⦵})	−13.0 kJ·mol^{−1}

Hazards
- Occupational safety and health (OHS/OSH)
Main hazards	Carcinogen; Extremely flammable
- GHS labelling
Pictograms	(GHS02: Flammable) (GHS06: Toxic) (GHS08: Health hazard)
Hazard statements	H220, H230, H301, H314, H331, H335, H336, H340, H350, H360FD, H372
Precautionary statements	P202, P210, P260, P280, P301+P310+P330, P303+P361+P353, P305+P351+P338+P310, P410+P403
NFPA 704 (fire diamond)	3 4 3
Flash point	−20 °C (−4 °F; 253 K)
Autoignition temperature	429 °C (804 °F; 702 K)
Explosive limits	3 to 100%
- Lethal dose or concentration (LD, LC)
LC_{50} (median concentration)	836 ppm (mouse, 4 hr); 4000 ppm (rat, 4 hr); 800 ppm (rat, 4 hr); 819 ppm (guinea pig, 4 hr); 1460 ppm (rat, 4 hr); 835 ppm (mouse, 4 hr); 960 ppm (dog, 4 hr)
- NIOSH (US health exposure limits)
PEL (Permissible)	TWA 1 ppm 5 ppm [15-minute excursion]
REL (Recommended)	Ca TWA <0.1 ppm (0.18 mg/m^{3}) C 5 ppm (9 mg/m^{3}) [10-min/day]
IDLH (Immediate danger)	Ca [800 ppm]
Safety data sheet (SDS)	ICSC 0155

Related compounds
Related heterocycles	Aziridine, thiirane, borirane
- Except where otherwise noted, data are given for materials in their standard state (at 25 °C [77 °F], 100 kPa). verify (what is ?) Infobox references

Ethylene oxide is an organic compound with the formula C_{2}H_{4}O. It is a cyclic ether and the simplest epoxide: a three-membered ring consisting of one oxygen atom and two carbon atoms. Ethylene oxide is a colorless and flammable gas with a faintly sweet odor. Because it is a strained ring, ethylene oxide easily participates in a number of addition reactions that result in ring-opening. Ethylene oxide is isomeric with acetaldehyde and with vinyl alcohol. Ethylene oxide is industrially produced by oxidation of ethylene in the presence of a silver catalyst.

The reactivity that is responsible for many of ethylene oxide's hazards also makes it useful. Although too dangerous for direct household use and generally unfamiliar to consumers, ethylene oxide is used for making many consumer products as well as non-consumer chemicals and intermediates. These products include detergents, thickeners, solvents, plastics, and various organic chemicals such as ethylene glycol, ethanolamines, simple and complex glycols, polyglycol ethers, and other compounds. Although it is a vital raw material with diverse applications, including the manufacture of products like polysorbate 20 and polyethylene glycol (PEG) that are often more effective and less toxic than alternative materials, ethylene oxide itself is a very hazardous substance. At room temperature it is a very flammable, carcinogenic, mutagenic, irritating; and anaesthetic gas.

Ethylene oxide is a surface disinfectant that is widely used in hospitals and the medical equipment industry to replace steam in the sterilization of heat-sensitive tools and equipment, such as disposable plastic syringes. It is so flammable and extremely explosive that it is used as a main component of thermobaric weapons; therefore, it is commonly handled and shipped as a refrigerated liquid to control its hazardous nature.

== History ==
Ethylene oxide was first reported in 1859 by the French chemist Charles-Adolphe Wurtz, who prepared it by treating 2-chloroethanol with potassium hydroxide:

Cl−CH_{2}CH_{2}−OH + KOH → (CH_{2}CH_{2})O + KCl + H_{2}O

Wurtz measured the boiling point of ethylene oxide as 13.5 °C (56.3 °F), slightly higher than the present value, and discovered the ability of ethylene oxide to react with acids and salts of metals. Wurtz mistakenly assumed that ethylene oxide has the properties of an organic base. This misconception persisted until 1896, when Georg Bredig found that ethylene oxide is not an electrolyte. That it differed from other ethers — particularly by its propensity to engage in the addition reactions typical of unsaturated compounds — had long been a matter of debate. The heterocyclic triangular structure of ethylene oxide was proposed by 1868 or earlier.

Wurtz's 1859 synthesis long remained the only method of preparing ethylene oxide, despite numerous attempts, including by Wurtz himself, to produce ethylene oxide directly from ethylene. Only in 1931 did French chemist Theodore Lefort develop a method of direct oxidation of ethylene in the presence of silver catalyst. Since 1940, almost all industrial production of ethylene oxide has relied on this process. Sterilization by ethylene oxide for the preservation of spices was patented in 1938 by the American chemist Lloyd Hall. Ethylene oxide achieved industrial importance during World War I as a precursor to both the coolant ethylene glycol and the chemical weapon mustard gas.

== Molecular structure and properties ==
Molecular geometry

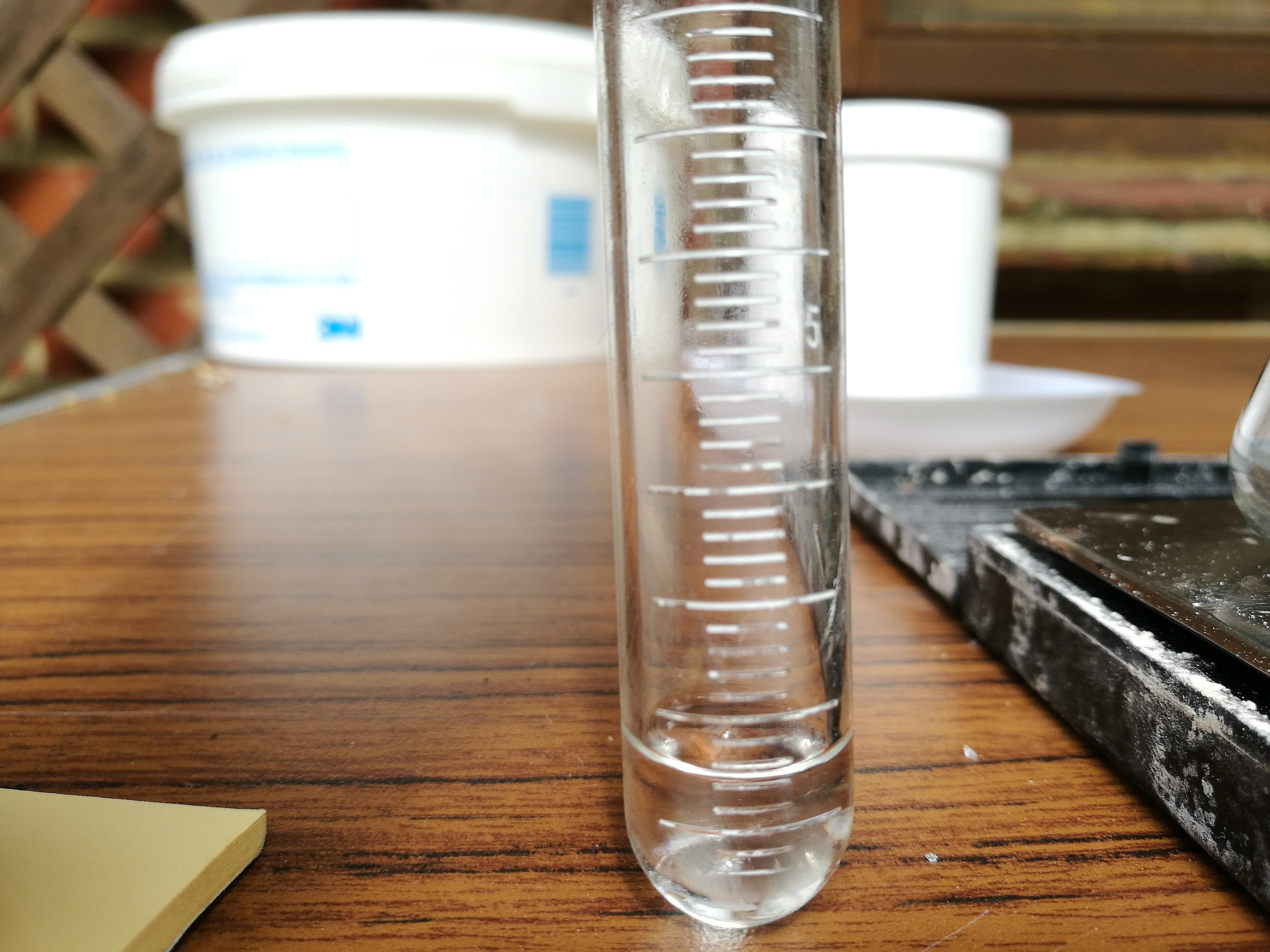
Condensed ethylene oxide

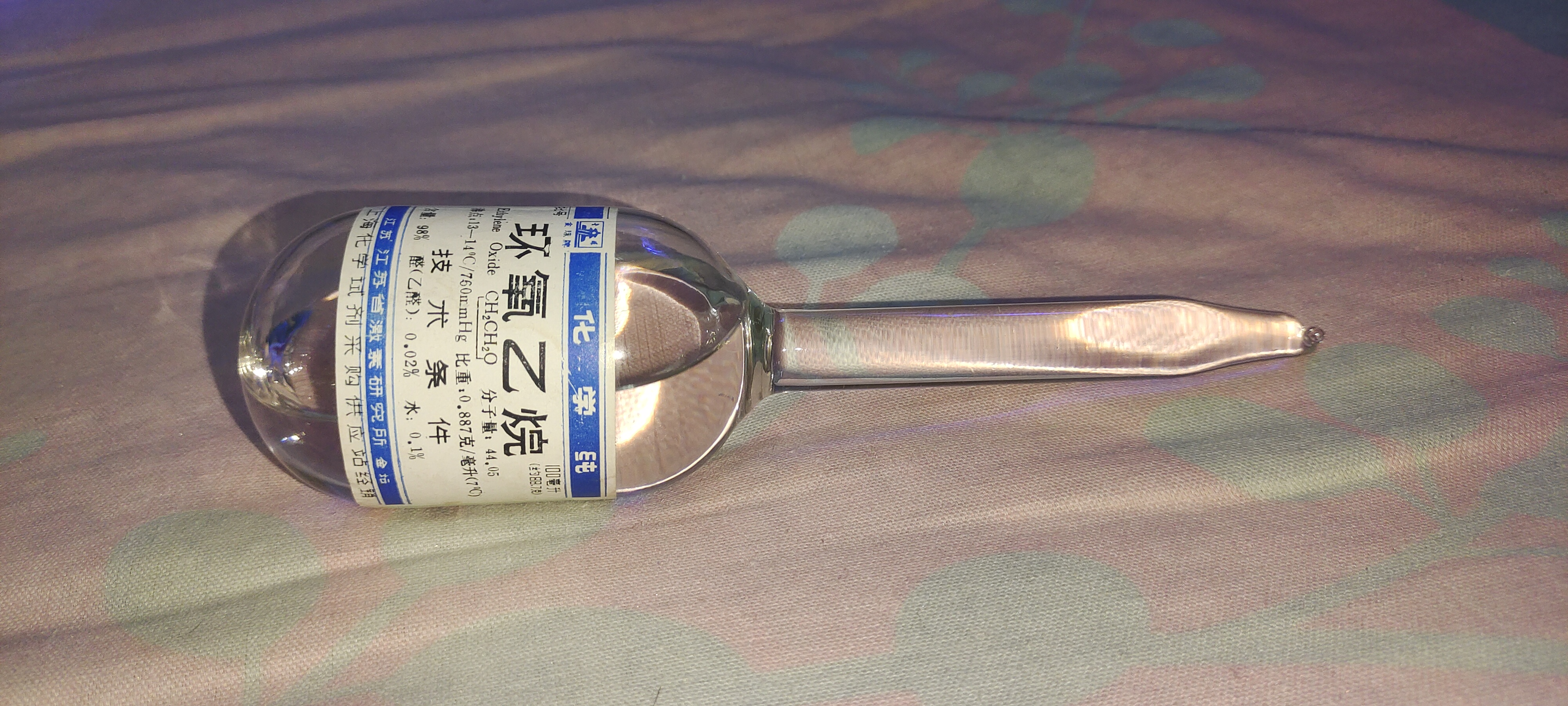
Liquid ethylene oxide in a 100 ml ampoule

The epoxy cycle of ethylene oxide is an almost regular triangle with bond angles of about 60° and a significant angular strain corresponding to the energy of 105 kJ/mol. For comparison, in alcohols the C–O–H angle is about 110°; in ethers, the C–O–C angle is 120°. The moment of inertia about each of the principal axes are I_{A} = 32.921×10^{−40} g·cm^{2}, I_{B} = 37.926×10^{−40} g·cm^{2} and I_{C} = 59.510×10^{−40} g·cm^{2}.

The relative instability of the carbon-oxygen bonds in the molecule is revealed by the comparison in the table of the energy required to break two C–O bonds in the ethylene oxide or one C–O bond in ethanol and dimethyl ether:

Reaction	ΔH°_{298}, kJ/mol	Method
(C_{2}H_{4})O → C_{2}H_{4} + O (cleavage of two bonds)	354.38	Calculated, from atomic enthalpies
C_{2}H_{5}OH → C_{2}H_{5} + OH (breaking one bond)	405.85	Electron impact
CH_{3}OCH_{3} → CH_{3}O + CH_{3} (breaking one bond)	334.72	Calculated using enthalpies of radicals formation

This instability correlates with its high reactivity, explaining the ease of its ring-opening reactions (see § Chemical properties).

== Physical properties ==
Ethylene oxide is a colorless gas at 25 °C (77 °F) and is a mobile liquid at 0 °C (32 °F) – viscosity of liquid ethylene oxide at 0 °C is about 5.5 times lower than that of water. The gas has a characteristic sweet odor of ether, noticeable when its concentration in air exceeds 500 ppm. Ethylene oxide is readily soluble in water, ethanol, diethyl ether, and many organic solvents.

Main thermodynamical constants are:

- The surface tension of liquid ethylene oxide, at the interface with its own vapor, is 35.8 mJ/m^{2} (0.00079 cal/sq ft) at −50.1 °C (−58.2 °F) and 27.6 mJ/m^{2} (0.00061 cal/sq ft) at −0.1 °C (31.8 °F).
- The boiling point increases with the vapor pressure as follows: 57.7 °C (135.9 °F) (2 atm (200 kPa; 29 psi)), 83.6 °C (182.5 °F) (5 atm (510 kPa; 73 psi)), and 114.0 °C (237.2 °F) (10 atm (1,000 kPa; 150 psi)).
- Viscosity decreases with temperature with the values of 0.577 kPa·s at −49.8 °C (−57.6 °F), 0.488 kPa·s at −38.2 °C (−36.8 °F), 0.394 kPa·s at −21.0 °C (−5.8 °F), and 0.320 kPa·s at 0 °C (32 °F).

Between −91 and 10.5 °C (−131.8 and 50.9 °F), vapor pressure p (in mmHg) varies with temperature (T in °C) as

$\lg p=6.251 - \frac{1115.1}{244.14 + T}$.

Properties of liquid ethylene oxide
Temperature, °C	Vapor pressure, kPa	Enthalpy of the liquid, J/g	Enthalpy of vaporization, J/g	Density, kg/L	Heat capacity, J/(kg·K)	Thermal conductivity, W/(m·K)
−40	8.35	0	628.6	0.9488	1878	0.20
−20	25.73	38.8	605.4	0.9232	1912	0.18
0	65.82	77.3	581.7	0.8969	1954	0.16
20	145.8	115.3	557.3	0.8697	2008	0.15
40	288.4	153.2	532.1	0.8413	2092	0.14
60	521.2	191.8	505.7	0.8108	2247	0.14
80	875.4	232.6	477.4	0.7794	2426	0.14
100	1385.4	277.8	445.5	0.7443	2782	0.13
120	2088	330.4	407.5	0.7052	3293	N/A*
140	3020	393.5	359.4	0.6609	4225	N/A
160	4224	469.2	297.1	0.608	N/A	N/A
180	5741	551.2	222.5	0.533	N/A	N/A
195.8	7191	N/A	N/A	N/A	N/A	N/A

*N/A – data not available.

Properties of ethylene oxide vapor
Temperature, K	Entropy, J/(mol·K)	Heat of formation, kJ/mol	Free energy of formation, kJ/mol	Viscosity, μPa·s	Thermal conductivity, W/(m·K)	Heat capacity, J/(mol·K)
298	242.4	−52.63	−13.10	N/A	N/A	48.28
300	242.8	−52.72	−12.84	9.0	0.012	48.53
400	258.7	−56.53	1.05	13.5	0.025	61.71
500	274.0	−59.62	15.82	15.4	0.038	75.44
600	288.8	−62.13	31.13	18.2	0.056	86.27
700	302.8	−64.10	46.86	20.9	0.075	95.31
800	316.0	−65.61	62.80	N/A	0.090	102.9

*N/A – data not available.

== Chemical properties ==
Ethylene oxide readily reacts with diverse compounds with opening of the ring. Its typical reactions are with nucleophiles which proceed via the S_{N}2 mechanism both in acidic (weak nucleophiles: water, alcohols) and alkaline media (strong nucleophiles: OH^{−}, RO^{−}, NH_{3}, RNH_{2}, RR'NH, etc.). The general reaction scheme is

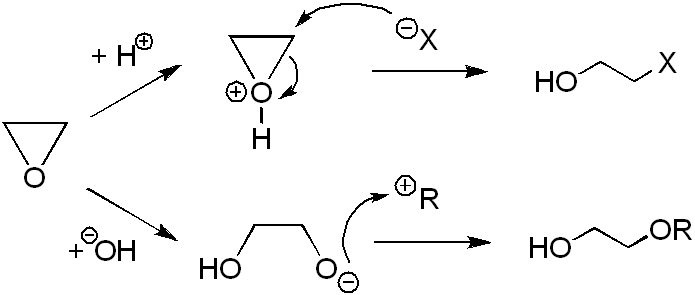

and more specific reactions are described below.

=== Addition of water and alcohols ===
Aqueous solutions of ethylene oxide are rather stable and can exist for a long time without any noticeable chemical reaction. However adding a small amount of acid, such as strongly diluted sulfuric acid, immediately leads to the formation of ethylene glycol, even at room temperature:

(CH_{2}CH_{2})O + H_{2}O → HO–CH_{2}CH_{2}–OH

The reaction also occurs in the gas phase, in the presence of a phosphoric acid salt as a catalyst.

The reaction is usually carried out at about 60 °C (140 °F) with a large excess of water, in order to prevent the reaction of the formed ethylene glycol with ethylene oxide that would form di- and triethylene glycol:

2 (CH_{2}CH_{2})O + H_{2}O → HO–CH_{2}CH_{2}–O–CH_{2}CH_{2}–OH
3 (CH_{2}CH_{2})O + H_{2}O → HO–CH_{2}CH_{2}–O–CH_{2}CH_{2}–O–CH_{2}CH_{2}–OH

The use of alkaline catalysts may lead to the formation of polyethylene glycol:

n (CH_{2}CH_{2})O + H_{2}O → HO–(–CH_{2}CH_{2}–O–)_{n}–H

Reactions with alcohols proceed similarly yielding ethylene glycol ethers:

(CH_{2}CH_{2})O + C_{2}H_{5}OH → HO–CH_{2}CH_{2}–OC_{2}H_{5}

2 (CH_{2}CH_{2})O + C_{2}H_{5}OH → HO–CH_{2}CH_{2}–O–CH_{2}CH_{2}–OC_{2}H_{5}

Reactions with lower alcohols occur less actively than with water and require more severe conditions, such as heating to 160 °C (320 °F) and pressurizing to 3 MPa (440 psi) and adding an acid or alkali catalyst.

Reactions of ethylene oxide with fatty alcohols proceed in the presence of sodium metal, sodium hydroxide, or boron trifluoride and are used for the synthesis of surfactants.

=== Addition of carboxylic acids and their derivatives ===
Reactions of ethylene oxide with carboxylic acids in the presence of a catalyst results in glycol mono- and diesters:

(CH_{2}CH_{2})O + CH_{3}CO_{2}H → HOCH_{2}CH_{2}–O_{2}CCH_{3}
(CH_{2}CH_{2})O + (CH_{3}CO)_{2}O → CH_{3}CO_{2}CH_{2}CH_{2}O_{2}CCH_{3}

The addition of acid amides proceeds similarly:

(CH_{2}CH_{2})O + CH_{3}CONH_{2} → HOCH_{2}CH_{2}NHC(O)CH_{3}

Addition of ethylene oxide to higher carboxylic acids is carried out at elevated temperatures (typically 140–180 °C (284–356 °F)) and pressure (0.3–0.5 MPa (44–73 psi)) in an inert atmosphere, in presence of an alkaline catalyst (concentration 0.01–2%), such as hydroxide or carbonate of sodium or potassium. The carboxylate ion acts as nucleophile in the reaction:

(CH_{2}CH_{2})O + RCO_{2}^{−} → RCO_{2}CH_{2}CH_{2}O^{−}
RCO_{2}CH_{2}CH_{2}O^{−} + RCO_{2}H → RCO_{2}CH_{2}CH_{2}OH + RCO_{2}^{−}

=== Adding ammonia and amines ===
Ethylene oxide reacts with ammonia forming a mixture of mono-, di-, and tri- ethanolamines. The reaction is stimulated by adding a small amount of water.

(CH_{2}CH_{2})O + NH_{3} → HO–CH_{2}CH_{2}–NH_{2}

2 (CH_{2}CH_{2})O + NH_{3} → (HO–CH_{2}CH_{2})_{2}NH

3 (CH_{2}CH_{2})O + NH_{3} → (HO–CH_{2}CH_{2})_{3}N

Similarly proceed the reactions with primary and secondary amines:

(CH_{2}CH_{2})O + RNH_{2} → HO–CH_{2}CH_{2}–NHR

Dialkylamino ethanols can further react with ethylene oxide, forming amino polyethylene glycols:

n (CH_{2}CH_{2})O + R_{2}NCH_{2}CH_{2}OH → R_{2}NCH_{2}CH_{2}O–(–CH_{2}CH_{2}O–)_{n}–H

Trimethylamine reacts with ethylene oxide in the presence of water, forming choline:

(CH_{2}CH_{2})O + (CH_{3})_{3}N + H_{2}O → [HOCH_{2}CH_{2}N (CH_{3})_{3}]^{+}OH^{−}

Aromatic primary and secondary amines also react with ethylene oxide, forming the corresponding arylamino alcohols.

=== Halide addition ===
Ethylene oxide readily reacts with aqueous solutions of hydrochloric, hydrobromic, and hydroiodic acids to form halohydrins. The reaction occurs easier with the last two acids:

(CH_{2}CH_{2})O + HCl → HO–CH_{2}CH_{2}–Cl

The reaction with these acids competes with the acid-catalyzed hydration of ethylene oxide; therefore, there is always a by-product of ethylene glycol with an admixture of diethylene glycol. For a cleaner product, the reaction is conducted in the gas phase or in an organic solvent.

Ethylene fluorohydrin is obtained differently, by boiling hydrogen fluoride with a 5–6% solution of ethylene oxide in diethyl ether. The ether normally has a water content of 1.5–2%; in absence of water, ethylene oxide polymerizes.

Halohydrins can also be obtained by passing ethylene oxide through aqueous solutions of metal halides:

2 (CH_{2}CH_{2})O + CuCl_{2} + 2 H_{2}O → 2 HO–CH_{2}CH_{2}–Cl + Cu(OH)_{2}↓

=== Metalorganic addition ===
Interaction of ethylene oxide with organomagnesium compounds, which are Grignard reagents, can be regarded as nucleophilic substitution influenced by carbanion organometallic compounds. The final product of the reaction is a primary alcohol:

$$\ce{(CH2CH2)O{} + RMgBr -> R-CH2CH2-OMgBr ->[\ce{H2O}]
\overset{primary~alcohol}{R-CH2CH2-OH}}$$

Similar mechanism is valid for other organometallic compounds, such as alkyl lithium:

$$\ce{(CH2CH2)O{} + \overset{alkyl~lithium}{RLi} -> R-CH2CH2-OLi ->[\ce{H2O}] R-CH2CH2-OH}$$

=== Other addition reactions ===
==== Addition of hydrogen cyanide ====
Ethylene oxide easily reacts with hydrogen cyanide forming ethylene cyanohydrin:

(CH_{2}CH_{2})O + HCN → HO–CH_{2}CH_{2}–CN

A slightly chilled (10–20 °C) aqueous solution of calcium cyanide can be used instead of HCN:

2 (CH_{2}CH_{2})O + Ca(CN)_{2} + 2 H_{2}O → 2 HO–CH_{2}CH_{2}–CN + Ca(OH)_{2}

Ethylene cyanohydrin easily loses water, producing acrylonitrile:

HO–CH_{2}CH_{2}–CN → CH_{2}=CH–CN + H_{2}O

==== Addition of hydrogen sulfide and mercaptans ====
When reacting with the hydrogen sulfide, ethylene oxide forms 2-mercaptoethanol and thiodiglycol, and with alkylmercaptans it produces 2-alkyl mercaptoethanol:

(CH_{2}CH_{2})O + H_{2}S → HO–CH_{2}CH_{2}–HS
2 (CH_{2}CH_{2})O + H_{2}S → (HO–CH_{2}CH_{2})_{2}S
(CH_{2}CH_{2})O + RHS → HO–CH_{2}CH_{2}–SR

The excess of ethylene oxide with an aqueous solution of hydrogen sulfide leads to the tris-(hydroxyethyl) sulfonyl hydroxide:

3 (CH_{2}CH_{2})O + H_{2}S → [(HO–CH_{2}CH_{2})_{3}S^{+}]OH^{−}

==== Addition of nitrous and nitric acids ====
Reaction of ethylene oxide with aqueous solutions of barium nitrite, calcium nitrite, magnesium nitrite, zinc nitrite, or sodium nitrite leads to the formation of 2-nitroethanol:

2 (CH_{2}CH_{2})O + Ca(NO_{2})_{2} + 2 H_{2}O → 2 HO–CH_{2}CH_{2}–NO_{2} + Ca(OH)_{2}

With nitric acid, ethylene oxide forms mono- and dinitroglycols:

$$\ce{(CH2CH2)O{} + \overset{nitric\atop acid}{HNO3} -> HO-CH2CH2-ONO2 ->[\ce{+HNO3}] [\ce{-H2O}] O2NO-CH2CH2-ONO_2}$$

==== Reaction with compounds containing active methylene groups ====
In the presence of alkoxides, reactions of ethylene oxide with compounds containing active methylene group leads to the formation of butyrolactones:

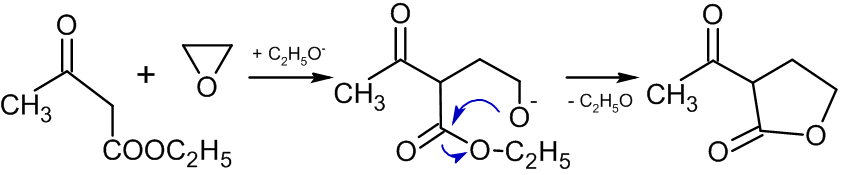

==== Alkylation of aromatic compounds ====
Ethylene oxide enters into the Friedel–Crafts reaction with benzene to form phenethyl alcohol:

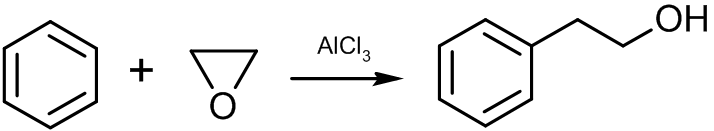

Styrene can be obtained in one stage if this reaction is conducted at elevated temperatures (315–440 °C (599–824 °F)) and pressures (0.35–0.7 MPa (51–102 psi)), in presence of an aluminosilicate catalyst.

==== Synthesis of crown ethers ====
A series of polynomial heterocyclic compounds, known as crown ethers, can be synthesized with ethylene oxide. One method is the cationic cyclopolymerization of ethylene oxide, limiting the size of the formed cycle:

n (CH_{2}CH_{2})O → (–CH_{2}CH_{2}–O–)_{n}

To suppress the formation of other linear polymers the reaction is carried out in a highly dilute solution.

Reaction of ethylene oxide with sulfur dioxide in the presence of caesium salts leads to the formation of an 11-membered heterocyclic compound which has the complexing properties of crown ethers:

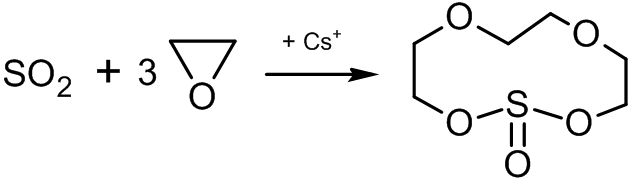

=== Isomerization ===
When heated to about 400 °C (750 °F), or to 150–300 °C (300–570 °F) in the presence of a catalyst (Al_{2}O_{3}, H_{3}PO_{4}, etc.), ethylene oxide isomerizes into acetaldehyde:

$$\ce{(CH2CH2)O ->[\ce{200^\circ C}] [\ce{Al2O3}] \overset{acetaldehyde}{CH3CHO}}$$

The radical mechanism was proposed to explain this reaction in the gas phase; it comprises the following stages:

(CH_{2}CH_{2})O ↔ •CH_{2}CH_{2}O• → CH_{3}CHO*	1

CH_{3}CHO* → CH_{3}• + CHO•	2

CH_{3}CHO* + M → CH_{3}CHO + M*	3

In reaction (3), M refers to the wall of the reaction vessel or to a heterogeneous catalyst. The moiety CH_{3}CHO* represents a short-lived (lifetime of 10^{−8.5} seconds), activated molecule of acetaldehyde. Its excess energy is about 355.6 kJ/mol, which exceeds by 29.3 kJ/mol the binding energy of the C-C bond in acetaldehyde.

In absence of a catalyst, the thermal isomerization of ethylene oxide is never selective and apart from acetaldehyde yields significant amount of by-products (see section Thermal decomposition).

=== Reduction reaction ===
Ethylene oxide can be hydrogenated into ethanol in the presence of a catalyst, such as nickel, platinum, palladium, boranes, lithium aluminium hydride, and some other hydrides.

$$\ce{(CH2CH2)O{} + H2 ->[\ce{Ni, Pt, Pd, BH3, LiAlH4}\text{ or other hydrides}] [\ce{80^\circ C}] \underset{ethanol}{C2H5OH}}$$

Conversely, with some other catalysts, ethylene oxide may be reduced by hydrogen to ethylene with the yield up to 70%. The reduction catalysts include mixtures of zinc dust and acetic acid, of lithium aluminium hydride with titanium trichloride (the reducing agent is actually titanium dichloride, formed by the reaction between LiAlH_{4} and TiCl_{3}) and of iron(III) chloride with butyllithium in tetrahydrofuran.

$$\ce{(CH2CH2)O{} + H2 ->[\ce{{Zn} + CH3COOH}] \underset{ethylene}{CH2=CH2} + H2O}$$

=== Oxidation ===
Ethylene oxide can further be oxidized, depending on the conditions, to glycolic acid or carbon dioxide:

$$\ce{(CH2CH2)O{} + O2 ->[\ce{AgNO3}] \overset{glycolic\ acid}{HOCH2CO2H}}$$

Deep gas-phase reactor oxidation of ethylene oxide at 800–1,000 K (527–727 °C; 980–1,340 °F) and a pressure of 0.1–1 MPa (15–145 psi) yields a complex mixture of products containing O_{2}, H_{2}, CO, CO_{2}, CH_{4}, C_{2}H_{2}, C_{2}H_{4}, C_{2}H_{6}, C_{3}H_{6}, C_{3}H_{8}, and CH_{3}CHO.

=== Dimerization ===
In the presence of acid catalysts, ethylene oxide dimerizes to afford dioxane:

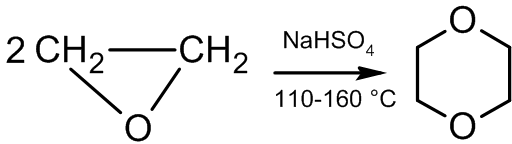

The reaction mechanism is as follows:

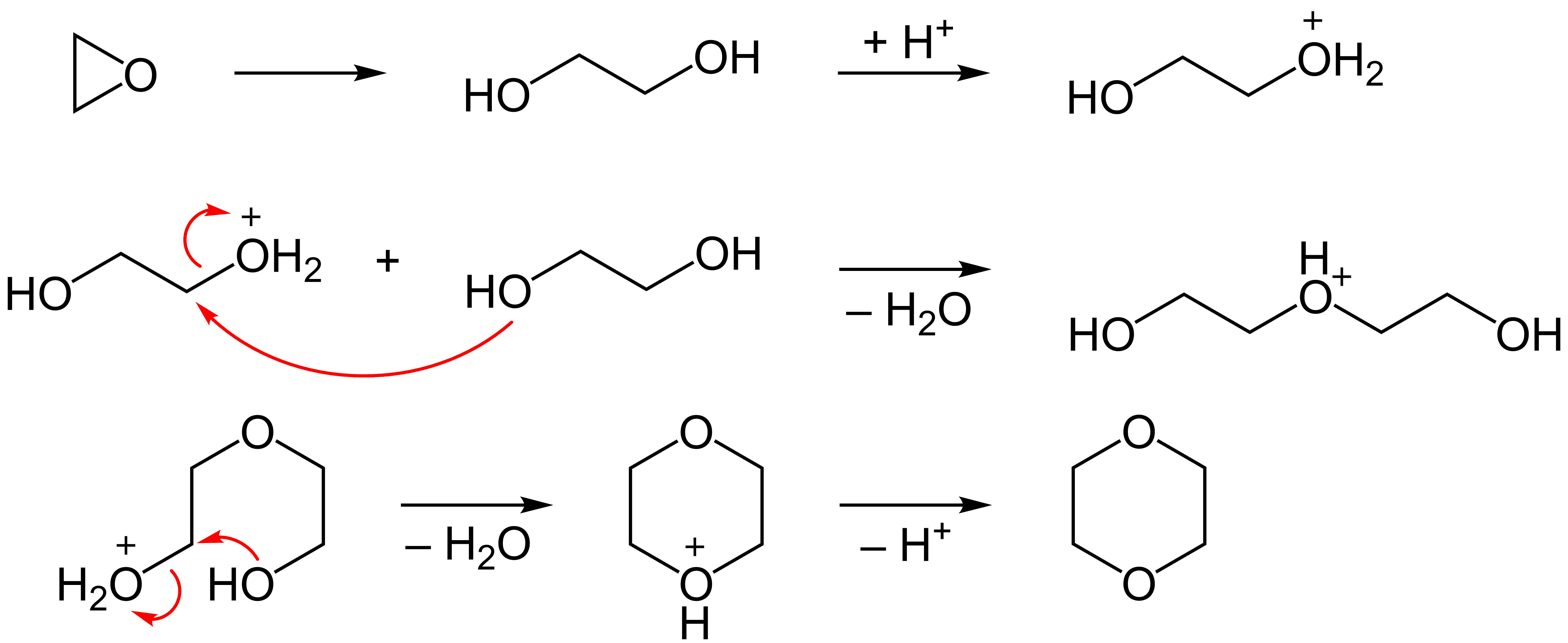

The dimerization reaction is unselective. By-products include acetaldehyde (due to isomerization). The selectivity and speed of dimerization can be increased by adding a catalyst, such as platinum, platinum-palladium, or iodine with sulfolane. 2-methyl-1,3-dioxolane is formed as a side product in the last case.

=== Polymerization ===
Liquid ethylene oxide can form polyethylene glycols. The polymerization can proceed via radical and ionic mechanisms, but only the latter has a wide practical application. Cationic polymerization of ethylene oxide is assisted by protic acids (HClO_{4}, HCl), Lewis acids (SnCl_{4}, BF_{3}, etc.), organometallic compounds, or more complex reagents:

$$n\ce{(CH2CH2)O ->[\ce{SnCl4}]}\ \overbrace{\ce{(CH2CH2-O-)}_n}^\ce{polyethyleneglycol}$$

The reaction mechanism is as follows. At the first stage, the catalyst (MX_{m}) is initiated by alkyl-or acylhalogen or by compounds with active hydrogen atoms, usually water, alcohol, or glycol:

MX_{m} + ROH → MX_{m}RO^{−}H^{+}

The resulting active complex reacts with ethylene oxide via the S_{N}2 mechanism:

(CH_{2}CH_{2})O + MX_{m}RO^{−}H^{+} → (CH_{2}CH_{2})O•••H^{+}O^{−}RMX_{m}
(CH_{2}CH_{2})O•••H^{+} O^{−}RMX_{m} → HO–CH_{2}CH_{2}^{+} + MX_{m}RO^{−}_{2}

HO–CH_{2}CH_{2}^{+} + n (CH_{2}CH_{2})O → HO–CH_{2}CH_{2}–(O–CH_{2}CH_{2})_{n}^{+}

The chain breaks as

HO–CH_{2}CH_{2}–(O–CH_{2}CH_{2})_{n}^{+} + MX_{m}RO^{−} → HO–CH_{2}CH_{2}–(O–CH_{2}CH_{2})_{n}–OR + MX_{m}

H(O–CH_{2}CH_{2})_{n}–O–CH_{2}–CH_{2}^{+} + MX_{m}RO^{−} → H(O–CH_{2}CH_{2})_{n}–O–CH=CH_{2} + MX_{m} + ROH

Anionic polymerization of ethylene oxide is assisted by bases, such as alkoxides, hydroxides, carbonates, or other compounds of alkali or alkaline earth metals. The reaction mechanism is as follows:

(CH_{2}CH_{2})O + RONa → RO–CH_{2}CH_{2}–O^{−}Na^{+}

RO–CH_{2}CH_{2}–O^{−}Na^{+} + n (CH_{2}CH_{2})O → RO–(CH_{2}CH_{2}–O)_{n}–CH_{2}CH_{2}–O^{−}Na^{+}

RO–(CH_{2}CH_{2}–O)_{n}–CH_{2}CH_{2}–O^{−}Na^{+} → RO–(CH_{2}CH_{2}–O)_{n}–CH=CH_{2} + NaOH

RO–(CH_{2}CH_{2}–O)_{n}–CH_{2}CH_{2}–O^{−}Na^{+} + H_{2}O → RO–(CH_{2}CH_{2}–O)_{(n+1)}OH + NaOH

=== Thermal decomposition ===
Ethylene oxide is relatively stable to heating – in the absence of a catalyst, it does not dissociate up to 300 °C (572 °F), and only above 570 °C (1,058 °F) there is a major exothermic decomposition, which proceeds through the radical mechanism. The first stage involves isomerization, however high temperature accelerates the radical processes. They result in a gas mixture containing acetaldehyde, ethane, ethyl, methane, hydrogen, carbon dioxide, ketene, and formaldehyde. High-temperature pyrolysis (830–1,200 K (557–927 °C; 1,034–1,700 °F)) at elevated pressure in an inert atmosphere leads to a more complex composition of the gas mixture, which also contains acetylene and propane. Contrary to the isomerization, initiation of the chain occurs mainly as follows:

(CH_{2}CH_{2})O → •CH_{2}CH_{2}O• → CH_{2}O + CH_{2}:

When carrying the thermal decomposition of ethylene oxide in the presence of transition metal compounds as catalysts, it is possible not only to reduce its temperature, but also to have ethyl as the main product, that is to reverse the ethylene oxide synthesis reaction.

=== Other reactions ===
Thiocyanate ions or thiourea transform ethylene oxide into thiirane (ethylene sulfide):

(CH_{2}CH_{2})O + (NH_{2})_{2}C=S → (CH_{2}CH_{2})S + (NH_{2})_{2}C=O
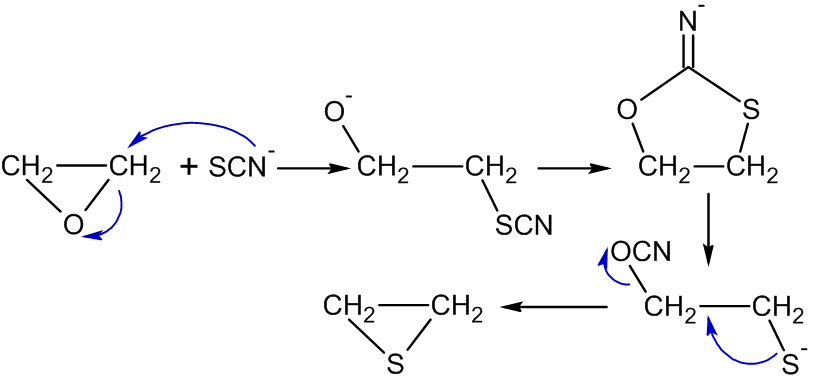

Reaction of phosphorus pentachloride with ethylene oxide produces ethylene dichloride:

(CH_{2}CH_{2})O + PCl_{5} → Cl–CH_{2}CH_{2}–Cl + POCl_{3}

Other dichloro derivatives of ethylene oxide can be obtained by combined action of sulfuryl chloride (SOCl_{2}) and pyridine and of triphenylphosphine and carbon tetrachloride.

Phosphorus trichloride reacts with ethylene oxide forming chloroethyl esters of phosphorous acid:

(CH_{2}CH_{2})O + PCl_{3} → Cl–CH_{2}CH_{2}–OPCl_{2}

2 (CH_{2}CH_{2})O + PCl_{3} → (Cl–CH_{2}CH_{2}–O)_{2}PCl

3 (CH_{2}CH_{2})O + PCl_{3} → Cl–CH_{2}CH_{2}–O)_{3}P

The reaction product of ethylene oxide with acyl chlorides in the presence of sodium iodide is a complex iodoethyl ester:

(CH_{2}CH_{2})O + RCOCl + NaI → RC(O)–OCH_{2}CH_{2}–I + NaCl

Heating ethylene oxide to 100 °C with carbon dioxide, in a non-polar solvent in the presence of bis-(triphenylphosphine)-nickel(0) results in ethylene carbonate:

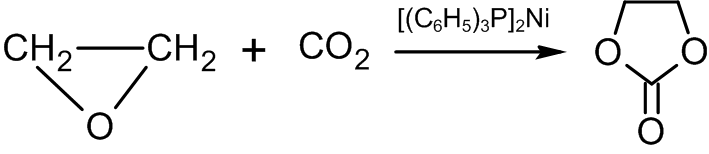

In industry, a similar reaction is carried out at high pressure and temperature in the presence of quaternary ammonium or phosphonium salts as a catalyst.

Reaction of ethylene oxide with formaldehyde at 80–150 °C in the presence of a catalyst leads to the formation of 1,3-dioxolane:

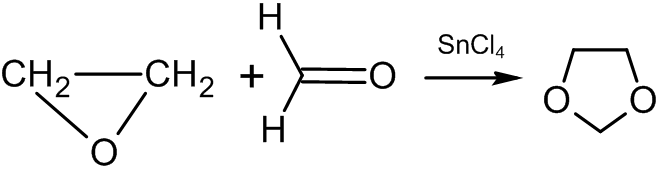

Substituting formaldehyde by other aldehydes or ketones results in a 2-substituted 1,3-dioxolane (yield: 70–85%, catalyst: tetraethylammonium bromide).

Catalytic hydroformylation of ethylene oxide gives hydroxypropanal which can be hydrogenated to propane-1,3-diol:

$$\ce{(CH2CH2)O + CO + H2 -> CHO-CH2CH2-OH ->[\ce{+H2}] HO-CH2CH2CH2-OH}$$

== Laboratory synthesis ==
=== Dehydrochlorination of ethylene and its derivatives ===
Dehydrochlorination of 2-chloroethanol, developed by Wurtz in 1859, remains a common laboratory route to ethylene oxide:

$$\ce{Cl-CH2CH2-OH + NaOH -> (CH2CH2)O + NaCl + H2O}$$

The reaction is carried out at elevated temperature, and beside sodium hydroxide or potassium hydroxide, calcium hydroxide, barium hydroxide, magnesium hydroxide, or carbonates of alkali or alkaline earth metals can be used.

With a high yield (90%) ethylene oxide can be produced by treating calcium oxide with ethyl hypochlorite; substituting calcium by other alkaline earth metals reduces the reaction yield:

$$\ce{2 CH3CH2-OCl + CaO -> 2 (CH2CH2)O + CaCl2 + H2O}$$

=== Direct oxidation of ethylene by peroxy acids ===
Ethylene can be directly oxidized into ethylene oxide using peroxy acids, for example, peroxybenzoic or meta-chloro-peroxybenzoic acid:

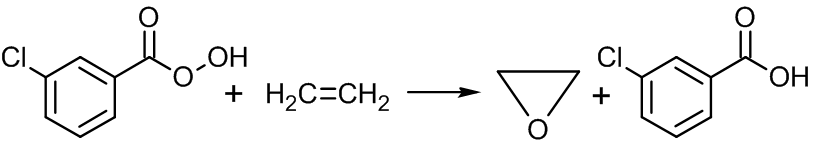

Oxidation by peroxy acids is efficient for higher alkenes, but not for ethylene. The above reaction is slow and has low yield, therefore it is not used in the industry.

=== Other preparative methods ===
Other synthesis methods include reaction of diiodo ethane with silver oxide:

$$\ce{I-CH2CH2-I + Ag2O -> (CH2CH2)O + 2AgI}$$

and decomposition of ethylene carbonate at 200–210 °C (392–410 °F) in the presence of hexachloroethane:

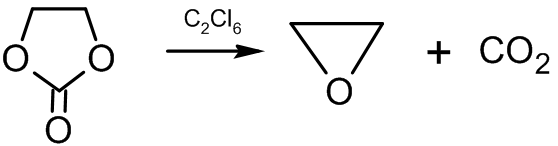

== Industrial synthesis ==
=== History ===
Commercial production of ethylene oxide dates back to 1914 when BASF built the first factory which used the chlorohydrin process (reaction of ethylene chlorohydrin with calcium hydroxide). The chlorohydrin process was unattractive for several reasons, including low efficiency and loss of valuable chlorine into calcium chloride. More efficient direct oxidation of ethylene by air was invented by Lefort in 1931 and in 1937 Union Carbide opened the first plant using this process. It was further improved in 1958 by Shell Oil Co. by replacing air with oxygen and using elevated temperature of 200–300 °C (390–570 °F) and pressure (1–3 MPa (150–440 psi)). This more efficient route accounted for about half of ethylene oxide production in the 1950s in the US, and after 1975 it completely replaced the previous methods. The production of ethylene oxide accounts for approximately 11% of worldwide ethylene demand.

=== Chlorohydrin process of production of ethylene oxide ===
Although the chlorohydrin process is almost entirely superseded in the industry by the direct oxidation of ethylene, the knowledge of this method is still important for educational reasons and because it is still used in the production of propylene oxide. The process consists of three major steps: synthesis of ethylene chlorohydrin, dehydrochlorination of ethylene chlorohydrin to ethylene oxide and purification of ethylene oxide. Those steps are carried continuously. In the first column, hypochlorination of ethylene is carried out as follows:

Cl_{2} + H_{2}O → HOCl + HCl

CH_{2}=CH_{2} + HOCl → HO–CH_{2}CH_{2}–Cl

CH_{2}=CH_{2} + Cl_{2} → Cl–CH_{2}CH_{2}–Cl

To suppress the conversion of ethylene into the ethylene dichloride (the last reaction), the concentration of ethylene is maintained at about 4–6%, and the solution is heated by steam to the boiling point.

Next, aqueous solution of ethylene chlorohydrin enters the second column, where it reacts with a 30% solution of calcium hydroxide at 100 °C (212 °F):

2 HO–CH_{2}CH_{2}–Cl + Ca(OH)_{2} → 2 (CH_{2}CH_{2})O + CaCl_{2} + 2H_{2}O

The produced ethylene oxide is purified by distillation. The chlorohydrin process allows to reach 95% conversion of ethylene chlorohydrin. The yield of ethylene oxide is about 80% of the theoretical value; for 1 tonne (0.98 long tons; 1.1 short tons) of ethylene oxide, about 200 kg (440 lb) of ethylene dichloride is produced. But, the major drawbacks of this process are high chlorine consumption and effluent load. This process is now obsolete.

=== Direct oxidation of ethylene ===
==== Usage in global industry ====
Direct oxidation of ethylene was patented by Lefort in 1931. This method was repeatedly modified for industrial use, and at least four major variations are known. They all use oxidation by oxygen or air and a silver-based catalyst, but differ in the technological details and hardware implementations.

Union Carbide (currently a division of Dow Chemical Company) was the first company to develop the direct oxidation process.

A similar production method was developed by Scientific Design Co., but it received wider use because of the licensing system – it accounts for 25% of the world's production and for 75% of world's licensed production of ethylene oxide. A proprietary variation of this method is used by Japan Catalytic Chemical Co., which adapted synthesis of both ethylene oxide and ethylene glycol in a single industrial complex.

A different modification was developed Shell International Chemicals BV. Their method is rather flexible with regard to the specific requirements of specific industries; it is characterized by high selectivity with respect to the ethylene oxide product and long lifetime of the catalyst (3 years). It accounts for about 40% of global production.

Older factories typically use air for oxidation whereas newer plants and processes, such as METEOR and Japan Catalytic, favor oxygen.

==== Chemistry and kinetics of the direct oxidation process ====
Formally, the direct oxidation process is expressed by the following equation:

$\ce{2CH_2=CH2 + O2 ->[\ce{Ag}] 2(CH2CH2)O}$, ΔH=−105 kJ/mol

However, significant yield of carbon dioxide and water is observed in practice, which can be explained by the complete oxidation of ethylene or ethylene oxide:

CH_{2}=CH_{2} + 3 O_{2} → 2 CO_{2} + 2 H_{2}O, ΔH=−1327 kJ/mol
(CH_{2}CH_{2})O + 2.5 O_{2} → 2 CO_{2} + 2 H_{2}O, ΔH=−1223 kJ/mol

According to a kinetic analysis by Kilty and Sachtler, the following reactions describe the pathway leading to EO. In the first step, a superoxide (O_{2}^{−}) species is formed:

O_{2} + Ag → Ag^{+}O_{2}^{−}

This species reacts with ethylene

Ag^{+}O_{2}^{−} + H_{2}C=CH_{2} → (CH_{2}CH_{2})O + AgO

The resulting silver oxide then oxidizes ethylene or ethylene oxide to CO_{2} and water. This reaction replenishes the silver catalyst. Thus the overall reaction is expressed as

7 CH_{2}=CH_{2} + 6 O_{2} → 6 (CH_{2}CH_{2})O + 2 CO_{2} + 2 H_{2}O

and the maximum degree of conversion of ethylene to ethylene oxide is theoretically predicted to be 6/7 or 85.7%, although higher yields are achieved in practice.

The catalyst for the reaction is metallic silver deposited on various matrixes, including pumice, silica gel, various silicates and aluminosilicates, alumina, and silicon carbide, and activated by certain additives (antimony, bismuth, barium peroxide, etc.). The process temperature was optimized as 220–280 °C (430–540 °F). Lower temperatures reduce the activity of the catalyst, and higher temperatures promote the complete oxidation of ethylene thereby reducing the yield of ethylene oxide. Elevated pressure of 1–3 MPa (150–440 psi) increases the productivity of the catalyst and facilitates absorption of ethylene oxide from the reacting gases.

Whereas oxidation by air is still being used, oxygen (> 95% purity) is preferred for several reasons, such as higher molar yield of ethylene oxide (75–82% for oxygen vs. 63–75% for air), higher reaction rate (no gas dilution) and no need of separating nitrogen in the reaction products.

=== Process overview ===
The production of ethylene oxide on a commercial scale is attained with the unification of the following unit processes:

- Main reactor
- Ethylene oxide scrubber
- Ethylene oxide de-sorber
- Stripping and distillation column
- CO_{2} scrubber and CO_{2} de-scrubber

Main Reactor: The main reactor consists of thousands of catalyst tubes in bundles. These tubes are generally 6 to 15 m (20 to 50 ft) long with an inner diameter of 20 to 50 mm (0.8 to 2.0 in). The catalyst packed in these tubes is in the form of spheres or rings of diameter 3 to 10 mm (0.12 to 0.39 in). The operating conditions of 200–300 °C (390–570 °F) with a pressure of 1–3 MPa (150–440 psi) prevail in the reactor. To maintain this temperature, the cooling system of the reactor plays a vital role. With the aging of the catalyst, its selectivity decreases and it produces more exothermic side products of CO_{2}.

Ethylene oxide scrubber: After the gaseous stream from the main reactor, containing ethylene oxide (1–2%) and CO_{2} (5%), is cooled, it is then passed to the ethylene oxide scrubber. Here, water is used as the scrubbing media which scrubs away majority of ethylene oxide along with some amounts of CO_{2}, N_{2}, CH_{2}=CH_{2}, CH_{4} and aldehydes (introduced by the recycle stream). Also, a small proportion of the gas leaving the ethylene oxide scrubber (0.1–0.2%) is removed continuously (combusted) to prevent the buildup of inert compounds (N_{2}, Ar, and C_{2}H_{6}), which are introduced as impurities with the reactants.

Ethylene oxide de-sorber: The aqueous stream resulting from the above scrubbing process is then sent to the ethylene oxide de-sorber. Here, ethylene oxide is obtained as the overhead product, whereas the bottom product obtained is known as the glycol bleed. When ethylene oxide is scrubbed from the recycle gas with an aqueous solution, ethylene glycols (viz. mono-ethylene glycol, di-ethylene glycol and other poly-ethylene glycols) get unavoidably produced. Thus, in-order to prevent them from building up in the system, they are continuously bled off.

Stripping and distillation column: Here, the ethylene oxide stream is stripped off its low boiling components and then distilled in-order to separate it into water and ethylene oxide.

CO_{2} scrubber: The recycle stream obtained from the ethylene oxide scrubber is compressed and a side-stream is fed to the CO_{2} scrubber. Here, CO_{2} gets dissolved into the hot aqueous solution of potassium carbonate (i.e., the scrubbing media). The dissolution of CO_{2} is not only a physical phenomenon, but a chemical phenomenon as well, for, the CO_{2} reacts with potassium carbonate to produce potassium hydrogen carbonate.

K_{2}CO_{3} + CO_{2} + H_{2}O → 2 KHCO_{3}

CO_{2} de-scrubber: The above potassium carbonate solution (enriched with CO_{2}) is then sent to the CO_{2} de-scrubber where CO_{2} is de-scrubbed by stepwise (usually two steps) flashing. The first step is done to remove the hydrocarbon gases, and the second step is employed to strip off CO_{2}.

=== World production of ethylene oxide ===
The world production of ethylene oxide was 20 Mt (22 million short tons) in 2009, 19 Mt (21 million short tons) in 2008 and 18 Mt (20 million short tons) in 2007. This places ethylene oxide 14th most produced organic chemical, whereas the most produced one was ethylene with 113 Mt (125 million short tons). SRI Consulting forecasted the growth of consumption of ethylene oxide of 4.4% per year during 2008–2013 and 3% from 2013 to 2018.

In 2004, the global production of ethylene oxide by region was as follows:

Region	Country (subregion)	Number of major producers	Production, thousand tonnes
North America	United States	10	4009
North America	Canada	3	1084
North America	Mexico	3	350
South America	Brazil	2	1
South America	Venezuela	312	82
Europe	Belgium	2	770
Europe	France	1	215
Europe	Germany	4	995
Europe	Netherlands	2	460
Europe	Spain	1	100
Europe	Turkey	1	115
Europe	United Kingdom	1	300
Europe	Eastern Europe	No data	950
Middle East	Iran	2	201
Middle East	Kuwait	1	350
Middle East	Saudi Arabia	2	1781
Asia	China	No data	1354
Asia	Taiwan	4	820
Asia	India	2	488
Asia	Indonesia	1	175
Asia	Japan	4	949
Asia	Malaysia	1	385
Asia	South Korea	3	740
Asia	Singapore	1	80

The world's largest producers of ethylene oxide are Dow Chemical Company (3–3.5 Mt (3.3–3.9 million short tons) in 2006), Saudi Basic Industries (2,000–2,500 tonnes (2,200–2,800 short tons) in 2006), Royal Dutch Shell (1.328 Mt (1.464 million short tons) in 2008–2009), BASF (1.175 Mt (1.295 million short tons) in 2008–2009), China Petrochemical Corporation (~1 Mt (1.1 million short tons) in 2006), Formosa Plastics (~1 Mt (1.1 million short tons) in 2006), and Ineos (0.92 Mt (1.01 million short tons) in 2008–2009).

== Applications ==
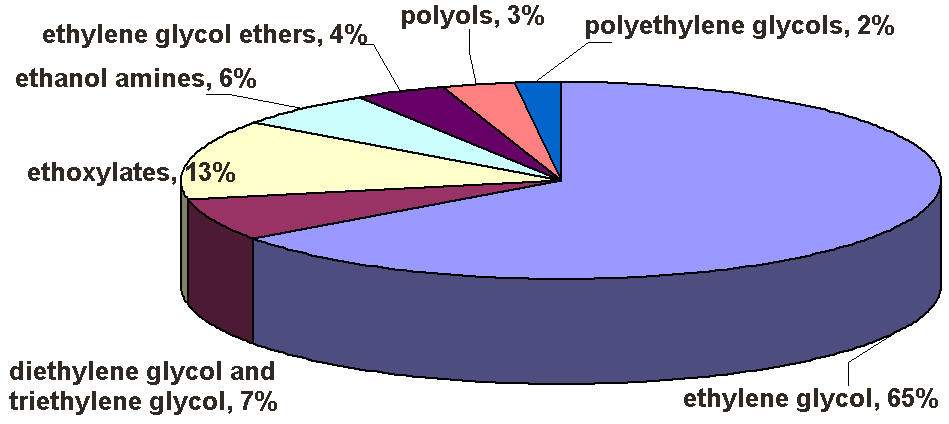
Global industrial use of ethylene oxide in 2007

Ethylene oxide is one of the most important raw materials used in large-scale chemical production. Most ethylene oxide is used for synthesis of ethylene glycols, including diethylene glycol and triethylene glycol, that accounts for up to 75% of global consumption. Other important products include ethylene glycol ethers, ethanolamines, and ethoxylates. Among glycols, ethylene glycol is used as antifreeze, in the production of polyester and polyethylene terephthalate (PET – raw material for plastic bottles), liquid coolants, and solvents.

Sector	Demand share (%)
Agrochemicals	7
Oilfield chemicals	10
Detergents	25
Textile	35
Personal care	10
Pharmaceuticals	8
Others	5
Total [2009]	5.2 Mt

Polyethyleneglycols are used in perfumes, cosmetics, pharmaceuticals, lubricants, paint thinners, and plasticizers. Ethylene glycol ethers are part of brake fluids, detergents, solvents, lacquers, and paints. Ethanolamines are used in the manufacture of soap and detergents and for purification of natural gas. Ethoxylates are reaction products of ethylene oxide with higher alcohols, acids, or amines. They are used in the manufacture of detergents, surfactants, emulsifiers, and dispersants.

Whereas synthesis of ethylene glycols is the major application of ethylene oxide, its percentage varies greatly depending on the region: from 44% in the Western Europe, 63% in Japan, and 73% in North America to 90% in the rest of Asia, and 99% in Africa.

=== Production of ethylene glycol ===
Ethylene glycol is industrially produced by non-catalytic hydration of ethylene oxide at a temperature of 200 °C (392 °F) and a pressure of 1.5–2 MPa (220–290 psi):

$$\ce{(CH2CH2)O + H2O -> HOCH2CH2OH}$$

By-products of the reaction are diethylene glycol, triethylene glycol, and polyglycols with the total of about 10%, which are separated from the ethylene glycol by distillation at reduced pressure.

Another synthesis method is the reaction of ethylene oxide and CO2 (temperature 80–120 °C (176–248 °F) and pressure of 5.2 MPa (750 psi)) yielding ethylene carbonate and its subsequent hydrolysis with decarboxylation:

$$\ce{(CH2CH2)O{} + CO2 -> \overset{ethylene\ carbonate}{(O-CH2CH_2-O)C=O} ->[\ce{+H2O}] [\ce{-CO2}] HOCH2CH2OH}$$

Modern technologies of production of ethylene glycol include the following. Shell OMEGA technology (Only Mono-Ethylene Glycol Advantage) is a two-step synthesis of ethylene carbonate using a phosphonium halide as a catalyst. The glycol yield is 99–99.5%, with other glycols practically absent. The main advantage of the process is production of pure ethylene glycol without the need for further purification. The first commercial plant which uses this method was opened in 2008 in South Korea. Dow METEOR (Most Effective Technology for Ethylene Oxide Reactions) is an integrated technology for producing ethylene oxide and its subsequent hydrolysis into ethylene glycol. The glycol yield is 90–93%. The main advantage of the process is relative simplicity, using fewer stages and less equipment.

Conversion to ethylene glycol is also the means by which waste ethylene oxide is scrubbed before venting to the environment. Typically the EtO is passed over a matrix containing either sulfuric acid or potassium permanganate.

=== Production of glycol ethers ===
The major industrial esters of mono-, di-, and triethylene glycols are methyl, ethyl, and normal butyl ethers, as well as their acetates and phthalates. The synthesis involves reaction of the appropriate alcohol with ethylene oxide:

$$\ce{(CH2CH2)O + ROH -> HOCH2CH2OR}$$
$$\ce{(CH2CH2)O + HOCH2CH2OR -> HOCH2CH2OCH2CH2OR}$$
$$\ce{(CH2CH2)O + HOCH2CH2OCH2CH2OR -> HOCH2CH2OCH2CH2OCH2CH2OR}$$

The reaction of monoesters with an acid or its anhydride leads to the formation of the esters:

$$\ce{CH3CO2H + HOCH2CH2OR -> ROCH2CH2OCOCH3 + H2O}$$

=== Production of ethanolamines ===
In the industry, ethanolamines (mono-, di-, and triethanolamines) are produced by reacting ammonia and ethylene oxide in anhydrous medium at a temperature of 40–70 °C (100–160 °F) and pressure of 1.5–3.5 MPa (220–510 psi) MPa:

$$\ce{(CH2CH2)O + NH3 -> HOCH2CH2NH2}$$
$$\ce{2 (CH2CH2)O + NH3 -> (HOCH2CH2)2NH}$$
$$\ce{3 (CH2CH2)O + NH3 -> (HOCH2CH2)3N}$$

All three ethanolamines are produced in the process, while ammonia and part of methylamine are recycled. The final products are separated by vacuum distillation. Hydroxyalkylamines are produced in a similar process:

$$\ce{(CH2CH2)O + RNH2 -> HOCH2CH2NHR}$$
$$\ce{2 (CH2CH2)O + RNH2 -> (HOCH2CH2)2NR}$$

Monosubstituted products are formed by reacting a large excess of amine with ethylene oxide in presence of water and at a temperature below 100 °C (212 °F). Disubstituted products are obtained with a small excess of ethylene oxide, at a temperature of 120–140 °C (250–280 °F) and a pressure of 0.3–0.5 MPa (45–75 psi).

=== Production of ethoxylates ===
Industrial production of ethoxylates is realized by a direct reaction of higher alcohols, acids, or amines with ethylene oxide in the presence of an alkaline catalyst at a temperature of 120–180 °C (250–360 °F). Modern plants producing ethoxylates are usually based on the BUSS LOOP reactors technology, which is based on a three-stage continuous process. In the first stage, the initiator or catalyst of the reaction and the feedstock are fed into the container, where they are mixed, heated, and vacuum dried. Then reaction is carried out in a special insulated reactor in an inert atmosphere (nitrogen) to prevent a possible explosion of ethylene oxide. Finally, the reaction mixture is neutralized, degassed, and purified.

=== Production of acrylonitrile ===
Currently, most acrylonitrile (90% in 2008) is produced by the SOHIO method, which is based on the catalytic oxidation of propylene in the presence of ammonia and bismuth phosphomolybdate. However, until 1960 a key production process was addition of hydrogen cyanide to ethylene oxide, followed by dehydration of the resulting cyanohydrin:

(CH_{2}CH_{2})O + HCN → HOCH_{2}CH_{2}CN CH_{2}=CH−CN

Addition of hydrocyanic acid to ethylene oxide is carried out in the presence of a catalyst (sodium hydroxide and diethylamine), and dehydration of cyanohydrin occurs in the gas phase upon the catalytic action of aluminium oxide.

== Non-industrial uses ==
The direct use of ethylene oxide accounts for only 0.05% (2004 data) of its global production. Ethylene oxide is used as a sterilizing agent, disinfecting agent and fumigant as a mixture with carbon dioxide (8.5–80% of ethylene oxide), nitrogen, or dichlorodifluoromethane (12% ethylene oxide). It is applied for gas-phase sterilization of medical equipment and instruments, packaging materials, clothing, and surgical and scientific equipment; for processing of storage facilities (tobacco, packages of grain, sacks of rice, etc.), clothing, furs, and valuable documents.

=== Healthcare sterilant ===
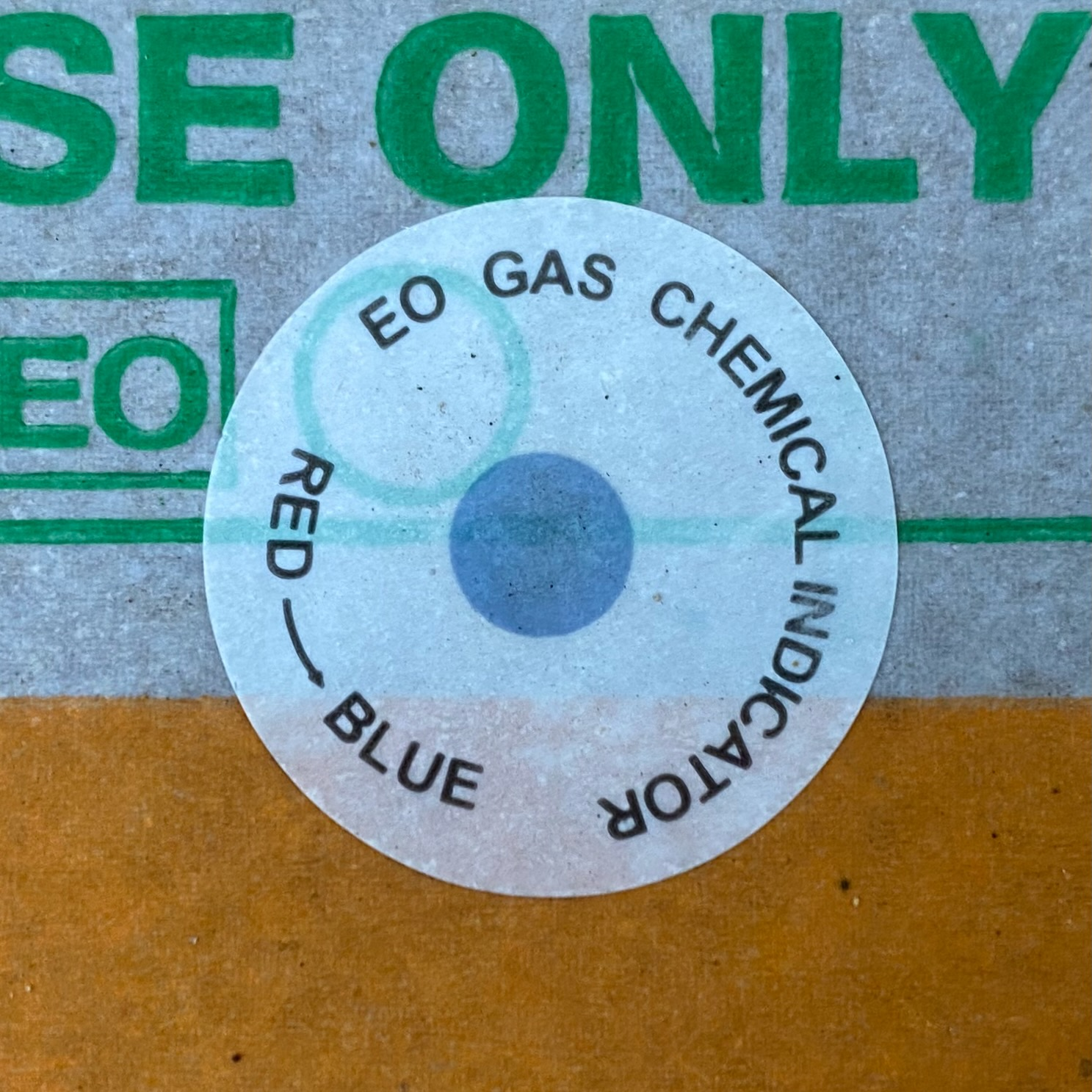
Ethylene oxide indicator sticker on a box of sterile medical supplies. The red sticker turns blue when it comes into contact with ethylene oxide

Ethylene oxide is one of the most commonly used sterilization methods in the healthcare industry because of its non-damaging effects on delicate instruments and devices that require sterilization, and for its wide range of material compatibility. It is used for instruments that cannot tolerate heat, moisture, or abrasive chemicals, such as electronics, optical equipment, paper, rubber, and plastics. It is the most common chemical sterilization method, used for approximately 70% of total sterilizations, and for over 50% of all disposable medical devices.

Ethylene oxide treatment was developed in the 1940s as a sterilant by the US military, and its use as a medical sterilant dates to the late 1950s, when the McDonald process was patented for medical devices. The Anprolene system was patented in the 1960s by Andersen Products, and it remains the most commonly used system in several niche markets, notably the veterinary market and some international markets. It relies on the use of a flexible sterilization chamber and an EtO cartridge for small volume sterilization, and where environmental and/or portability considerations dictate the use of a low dose. It is therefore referred to as the "flexible chamber sterilization" method, or the "gas diffusion sterilization" method.

In the United States, the operation of EtO sterilization is overseen by the EPA through the National Emissions Standards for Hazardous Air Pollutants (NESHAP).

=== Niche uses ===
Ethylene oxide is used as a fungicide and as an accelerator of maturation of tobacco leaves. Ethylene oxide is also used as a main component of thermobaric weapons (fuel-air explosives).

== Identification of ethylene oxide ==
Gas chromatography is the principal method for analysis and detection of ethylene oxide.

An inexpensive test for ethylene oxide exploits its precipitation of solid hydroxides of metals when it is passed through aqueous solutions of their salts:

$$\ce{2 (CH2CH2)O + MnCl2 + 2 H2O -> 2 HO-CH2CH2-Cl + Mn(OH)2 v}$$

Similarly, ethylene oxide is detected by the bright pink color of the indicator when passing air through aqueous solutions of some salts of sodium or potassium (chlorides, iodides, thiosulfates, etc.) with the addition of phenolphthalein:

$$\ce{(CH2CH2)O + NaCl + H2O -> HO-CH2CH2-Cl + NaOH}$$

Other methods of ethylene oxide detection are color reactions with pyridine derivatives and hydrolysis of ethylene glycol with periodic acid. The produced iodic acid is detected with silver nitrate.

== Accidents ==
Ethylene oxide is extremely flammable, and its mixtures with air are explosive. When heated it may rapidly expand, causing fire and explosion. Several industrial accidents have been attributed to ethylene oxide explosion.

The autoignition temperature is 429 °C (804 °F), decomposition temperature of 571 °C (1,060 °F) at 101.3 kPa (14.69 psi), minimum inflammable content in the air is 2.7%, and maximum limit is 100%. The NFPA 704 rating is Health, 3; Flammability, 4; Instability 2. Ethylene oxide in presence of water can hydrolyze to ethylene glycol and form polyethylene oxide, which then eventually is oxidized by air and leads to hotspots that can trigger explosive decomposition.

Fires caused by ethylene oxide are extinguished with conventional media including foam, carbon dioxide, or water. Suppression of this activity can be done by blanketing with an inert gas until total pressure reaches the nonexplosive range. Extinguishing of burning ethylene oxide is complicated by its ability to continue burning in an inert atmosphere and in water solutions. Fire suppression is reached only upon dilution with water above 22:1.

=== La Canonja, Spain accident ===
On 14 January 2020 in an industrial estate near Tarragona, an explosion of an ethoxylation reactor owned by the chemical company Industrias Quimicas de Oxido de Etileno (IQOXE, part of the CL Industrial Group) occurred. The accident launched substantial debris over a radius of about two and a half kilometers, one piece penetrating a distant home and killing an occupant. It is reported that at least three people were killed and seven injured as a direct result of the explosion.

The company was, until the time of the explosion the only producer of ethylene oxide in Spain with an installed capacity of 140,000 tons/year. Half of that production was used to manufacture ethylene glycol for PET production. The accident will be investigated under EU regulations within the context of the European Agency for Safety and Health at Work.

=== 2020 sesame seeds contamination ===
In September 2020, high levels of pesticides were found in 268 tonnes of sesame seeds from India. The contamination had a level of 1000 to 3500 times the limit of 0.05 milligrams per kilogram for ethylene oxide allowed in Europe. This pesticide is forbidden in Europe, where it is recognized to be carcinogenic and mutagenic. A product recall was made, half of the products had an organic certification.

In September, alert was raised by Belgium by RASFF, but the product has also been sold in other EU single market countries such as France and Ireland.

=== Long term exposure of residents living near medical supply warehouses ===
Residents living near Cardinal Health's warehouse, which holds sterilized medical supplies, in El Paso Texas reported respiratory symptoms in 2021. Some sources estimate these large warehouses holding sterilized medical equipment outgas more ethylene oxide than some sterilization plants due to laxer regulations. Further investigation discovered people living near these warehouses are being exposed to ethylene oxide levels sufficient to increase cancer risk to more than 1 in 10,000.

== Physiological effects ==
=== Effect on microorganisms ===
Exposure to ethylene oxide gas causes alkylation to microorganisms at a nuclear level. The disinfectant effect of ethylene oxide is similar to that of sterilization by heat, but because of limited penetration, it affects only the surface. ETO sterilization can take up to 12 hours due to its slow action upon microorganisms, and lengthy processing and aeration time.

=== Effects on humans and animals ===
Ethylene oxide is an alkylating agent; it has irritating, sensitizing, and narcotic effects. Chronic exposure to ethylene oxide is also mutagenic. The International Agency for Research on Cancer classifies ethylene oxide into group 1, meaning it is a proven carcinogen. Ethylene oxide is classified as a class 2 carcinogen by the German MAK commission and as a class A2 carcinogen by the ACGIH. A 2003 study of 7,576 women exposed while at work in commercial sterilization facilities in the US suggests ethylene oxide is associated with breast cancer incidence. A 2004 follow up study analyzing 18,235 men and women workers exposed to ethylene oxide from 1987 to 1998 concluded "There was little evidence of any excess cancer mortality for the cohort as a whole, with the exception of bone cancer based on small numbers. Positive exposure-response trends for lymphoid tumors were found for males only. Reasons for the sex specificity of this effect are not known. There was also some evidence of a positive exposure-response for breast cancer mortality." An increased incidence of brain tumors and mononuclear cell leukemia was found in rats that had inhaled ethylene oxide at concentrations of 10, 33 or 100 mL/m^{3} (0.0100, 0.0329 or 0.0997 imp fl oz/cu ft) over a period of two years. An increased incidence of peritoneal mesotheliomas was also observed in the animals exposed to concentrations of 33 and 100 mL/m^{3} (0.0329 and 0.0997 imp fl oz/cu ft). Results of human epidemiological studies on workers exposed to ethylene oxide differ. There is evidence from both human and animal studies that inhalation exposure to ethylene oxide can result in a wide range of carcinogenic effects.

Ethylene oxide is toxic by inhalation, with a US OSHA permissible exposure limit calculated as a TWA (time weighted average) over 8 hours of 1 ppm, and a short term exposure limit (excursion limit) calculated as a TWA over 15 minutes of 5 ppm. At concentrations in the air about 200 parts per million, ethylene oxide irritates mucous membranes of the nose and throat; higher contents cause damage to the trachea and bronchi, progressing into the partial collapse of the lungs. High concentrations can cause pulmonary edema and damage the cardiovascular system; the damaging effect of ethylene oxide may occur only after 72 hours after exposure. The maximum content of ethylene oxide in the air according to the US standards (ACGIH) is 1.8 mg/m^{3} (0.00079 gr/cu ft). NIOSH has determined that the Immediately Dangerous to Life and Health level (IDLH) is 800 ppm.

Because the odor threshold for ethylene oxide varies between 250 and 700 ppm, the gas is already at toxic concentrations when it can be smelled. Even then, the odor of ethylene oxide is sweet and aromatic and can easily be mistaken for the aroma of diethyl ether, a common laboratory solvent of very low toxicity. In view of these insidious properties, continuous electrochemical monitoring is standard practice, and it is forbidden to use ethylene oxide to fumigate building interiors in the EU and some other jurisdictions.

Ethylene oxide causes acute poisoning, accompanied by a variety of symptoms. Central nervous system effects are frequently associated with human exposure to ethylene oxide in occupational settings. Headache, nausea, and vomiting have been reported. Peripheral neuropathy, impaired hand-eye coordination and memory loss have been reported in more recent case studies of chronically-exposed workers at estimated average exposure levels as low as 3 ppm (with possible short-term peaks as high as 700 ppm). The metabolism of ethylene oxide is not completely known. Data from animal studies indicate two possible pathways for the metabolism of ethylene oxide: hydrolysis to ethylene glycol and glutathione conjugation to form mercapturic acid and meththio-metabolites.

Ethylene oxide easily penetrates through ordinary clothing and footwear, causing skin irritation and dermatitis with the formation of blisters, fever, and leukocytosis.

Toxicity data for ethylene oxide are as follows:

- Eye exposure: 18 mg (0.28 gr)/6 hours (rabbit)
- Oral: 72 mg/kg (0.00115 oz/lb) (rat, LD_{50}), 1,186 mg/kg (0.01898 oz/lb) (rat, TD_{Lo}), 5,112 mg/kg (0.08179 oz/lb) (rat, TD)
- Inhalation: 12,500 ppm (human, TC_{Lo}), 960 ppm/4 hours (dog, LC_{50}) 33–50 ppm (rat or mouse, TC), 800 ppm/4 hours (rat or mouse, LC_{50})
- Subcutaneous injection: 100 mg/kg (0.0016 oz/lb) (cat, LD_{Lo}), 292 mg/kg (0.00467 oz/lb) (mouse, TD_{Lo}) 900–2,600 mg/kg (0.014–0.042 oz/lb) (mouse, TD), 187 mg/kg (0.00299 oz/lb) (rat, LD_{50}).
- Intraperitoneal injection: 750 mg/kg (0.0120 oz/lb) (mouse, TD_{Lo}), 175 mg/kg (0.00280 oz/lb) (mouse, LD_{50})
- Intravenous injection: 175 mg/kg (0.00280 oz/lb) (rabbit, LD_{50}), 290 mg/kg (0.0046 oz/lb) (mouse, LD_{50})
- The US Environmental Protection Agency (USEPA) estimated in 2016 that for low doses, the inhalation of ethylene oxide for a lifetime could increase an individual's lifetime cancer risk by as much as 3.0 × 10^{−3} per μg/m^{3} (without considering that early-life exposures are likely more potent). The USEPA estimated the slope of the dose-response declines at higher doses, and extra cancer risk estimates for several occupational exposure scenarios are calculated.

== Global demand ==
Global EO demand has expanded from 16.6 Mt (18.3 million short tons) in 2004 to 20 Mt (22 million short tons) in 2009, while demand for refined EO expanded from 4.64 Mt (5.11 million short tons) in 2004 to 5.6 Mt (6.2 million short tons) in 2008. In 2009, demand is estimated to have declined to about 5.2 Mt (5.7 million short tons). Total EO demand registered a growth rate of 5.6% per annum during the period 2005 to 2009 and is projected to grow at 5.7% per annum during 2009 to 2013.

== Health and safety regulations ==
According to Merck Life Science UK 2020 Safety Data Sheet provided to the European Chemicals Agency's Registration, Evaluation, Authorisation and Restriction of Chemicals (REACH)—a 2006 European Union regulation, ethylene oxide is "presumed to have carcinogenic potential for humans."

The United States EPA published an advance notice of proposed rulemaking (NPRM) in the 12 December 2019 Federal Register seeking to limit EtO emissions. Over the next couple of years, information was collected and a proposed air toxics rule published in the 13 April 2023 Federal Register. Following a 60 day comment period that could be extended, due to many comments requesting an extension, the EPA rules that could reduce EtO emissions, both direct and fugitive, by over 80% could be implemented within 18 months of publishing the final rule in the Federal Register. Laboratory EtO emitters would still be exempt from the stricter compliance. Additionally, while effectively curbing EtO emissions in the USA, many industrial emitters may simply shift their EtO production to nearby less strict countries: Canada, Mexico, etc.

In 2024, U.S. probed claims that popular Indian curry brands MDH and Everest Spices carried ethylene oxide after Hong Kong and Singapore found the contamination in the products and took enforcement actions against them.

== Cited sources ==
- Haynes, William M., ed. (2011). CRC Handbook of Chemistry and Physics (92nd ed.). Boca Raton, FL: CRC Press. ISBN 978-1439855119.
