= Binary ethylenimine =

Binary ethylenimine (BEI) is a preparation of aziridine. It can be produced by heating bromoethylamine hydrobromide or 2-aminoethyl hydrogen sulfate in the presence of sodium hydroxide (Gabriel method). It contains at least one three-membered ring which is very reactive because of the ring strain.

It is used to inactivate the foot-and-mouth disease virus in vaccines for cattle, as well as other viruses and mycoplasma in blood samples.

Contrary to early assumptions that ethylenimines only modified nucleic acids, it was found that trimeric ethylenimine also alters proteins in virus preparations, especially at higher pH values. The modification of the proteins affected viral particle uptake into cells. This should be taken into consideration when using BEI and other ethyleneimines as well.

== Safety ==
BEI is very hazardous since it attacks nucleic acids and proteins as described above. It can be neutralised by sodium thiosulfate; the thiosulfate is a nucleophile which opens the three-membered ring.

The presence of BEI can be tested for using silver nitrate solution.
