= Aziridine =

Organic ring compound with the formula (CH2)2NH

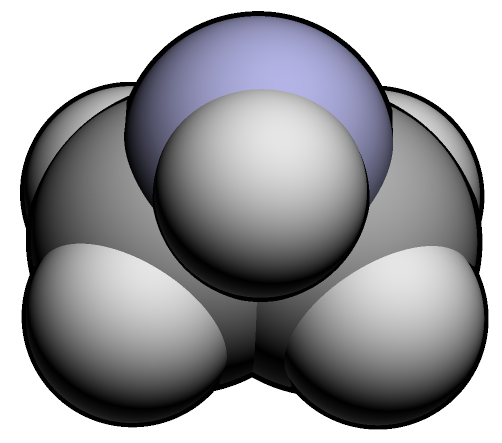

Names
- Preferred IUPAC name Aziridine
- Systematic IUPAC name Azacyclopropane
- Other names Azirane; Ethylenimine; Aminoethylene; Dimethyleneimine; Dimethylenimine; Ethylimine

Identifiers
CAS Number	151-56-4
3D model (JSmol)	Interactive image
Beilstein Reference	102380
ChEBI	CHEBI:30969
ChEMBL	ChEMBL540990
ChemSpider	8682
ECHA InfoCard	100.005.268
EC Number	205-793-9
Gmelin Reference	616
KEGG	C11687
PubChem CID	9033
RTECS number	KX5075000
UNII	54P5FEX9FH
UN number	1185
CompTox Dashboard (EPA)	DTXSID8020599
- InChI: InChI=1S/C2H5N/c1-2-3-1/h3H,1-2H2 Key: NOWKCMXCCJGMRR-UHFFFAOYSA-N; InChI=1/C2H5N/c1-2-3-1/h3H,1-2H2 Key: NOWKCMXCCJGMRR-UHFFFAOYAE
- SMILES: C1CN1

Properties
Chemical formula	C_{2}H_{5}N
Molar mass	43.069 g·mol^{−1}
Appearance	Colorless oily liquid
Odor	ammonia-like
Density	0.8321 g/mL 20 °C
Melting point	−77.9 °C (−108.2 °F; 195.2 K)
Boiling point	56 °C (133 °F; 329 K)
Solubility in water	miscible
Vapor pressure	160 mmHg (20°C)

Hazards
- Occupational safety and health (OHS/OSH)
Main hazards	highly flammable and toxic
- GHS labelling
Pictograms	(GHS02: Flammable) (GHS05: Corrosive) (GHS06: Toxic) (GHS08: Health hazard) (GHS09: Environmental hazard)
Signal word	Danger
Hazard statements	H225, H300, H310, H314, H330, H340, H350, H411
Precautionary statements	P201, P202, P210, P233, P240, P241, P242, P243, P260, P262, P264, P270, P271, P273, P280, P281, P284, P301+P310, P301+P330+P331, P302+P350, P303+P361+P353, P304+P340, P305+P351+P338, P308+P313, P310, P320, P321, P330, P361, P363, P370+P378, P391, P403+P233, P403+P235, P405, P501
NFPA 704 (fire diamond)	4 3 3
Flash point	−11 °C (12 °F; 262 K)
Autoignition temperature	322 °C (612 °F; 595 K)
Explosive limits	3.6–46%
- Lethal dose or concentration (LD, LC)
LC_{50} (median concentration)	250 ppm (rat, 1 hr); 250 ppm (guinea pig, 1 hr); 62 ppm (rat, 4 hr); 223 ppm (mouse, 2 hr); 56 ppm (rat, 2 hr); 2236 ppm (mouse, 10 min)
LC_{Lo} (lowest published)	25 ppm (guinea pig, 8 hr); 56 ppm (rabbit, 2 hr)
- NIOSH (US health exposure limits)
PEL (Permissible)	OSHA-Regulated Carcinogen
REL (Recommended)	Ca
IDLH (Immediate danger)	Ca [100 ppm]

Related compounds
Related heterocycles	Borirane; Ethylene oxide Thiirane
- Except where otherwise noted, data are given for materials in their standard state (at 25 °C [77 °F], 100 kPa). verify (what is ?) Infobox references

Aziridine is an organic compound consisting of the three-membered heterocycle C_{2}H_{5}N. It is a colorless, toxic, volatile liquid that is of significant practical interest. Aziridine was discovered in 1888 by the chemist Siegmund Gabriel. Its derivatives, also referred to as aziridines, are of broader interest in medicinal chemistry.

== Structure ==
The bond angles in aziridine are approximately 60°, considerably less than the normal hydrocarbon bond angle of 109.5°, which results in angle strain as in the comparable cyclopropane and ethylene oxide molecules. A banana bond model explains bonding in such compounds. Aziridine is less basic than acyclic aliphatic amines, with a pKa of 7.9 for the conjugate acid, due to increased s character of the nitrogen free electron pair. Angle strain in aziridine also increases the barrier to nitrogen inversion. This barrier height permits the isolation of separate invertomers, for example the cis and trans invertomers of N-chloro-2-methylaziridine.

== Synthesis and uses ==
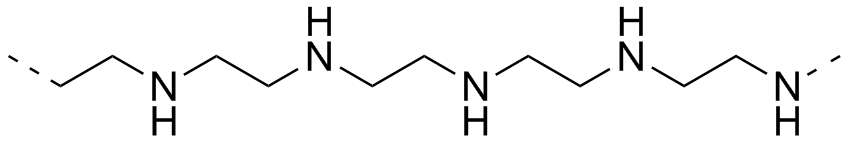
Linear polyethylenimine (PEI) fragment, derived from aziridine.

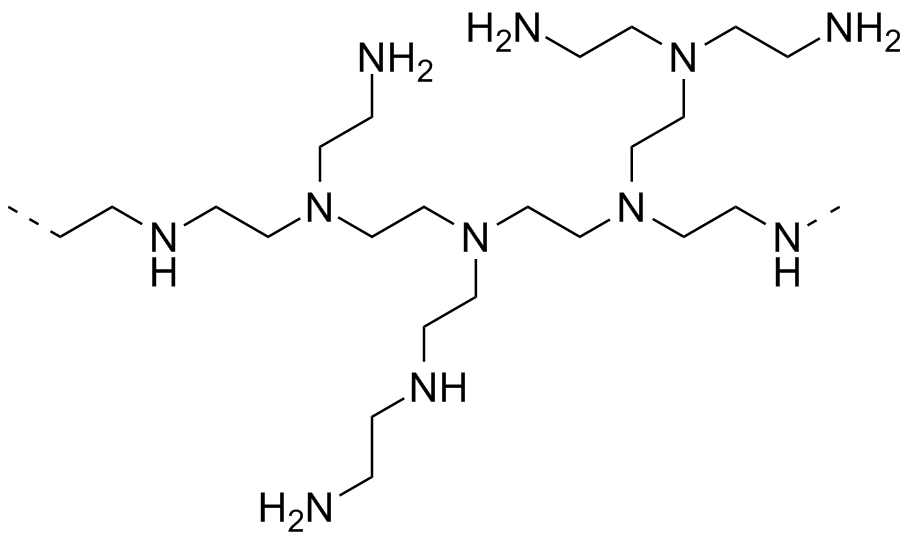
Typical branched PEI fragment, derived from aziridine.

Aziridine is produced industrially from aminoethanol via two related routes. The Nippon Shokubai process requires an oxide catalyst and high temperatures to effect the dehydration. In the Wenker synthesis, the aminoethanol is converted to the sulfate ester, which undergoes base-induced sulfate elimination. Older methods entailed amination of 1,2-dichloroethane and cyclization of 2-chloroethylamine.

Aziridine forms a wide variety of polymeric derivatives, known as polyethylenimines (PEI). These and related species are useful crosslinking agents and precursors for coatings.

== Safety ==
Aziridine is highly toxic with an LD_{50} of 14 mg (oral, rats). It is a skin irritant. As an alkylating agent, it is also a mutagen. It is reactive toward DNA, potentially relevant to its mutagenicity. Aziridine containing compounds also appear to be similarly dangerous.

== See also ==
- Binary ethylenimine, a dimeric form of aziridine
