= Ethylene episulfoxide =

Names
- Preferred IUPAC name 1λ^{4}-Thiiran-1-one
- Other names Ethylene sulfoxide Thiirane S-oxide; Thiirane oxide

Identifiers
CAS Number	7117-41-1
3D model (JSmol)	Interactive image
ChemSpider	122528
PubChem CID	138930
CompTox Dashboard (EPA)	DTXSID60221355
- InChI: InChI=1S/C2H4OS/c3-4-1-2-4/h1-2H2 Key: PCYCVCFVEKMHGA-UHFFFAOYSA-N
- SMILES: C1CS1=O

Properties
Chemical formula	C_{2}H_{4}OS
Molar mass	76.11 g·mol^{−1}
Appearance	colorless liquid
Boiling point	45–47 °C (113–117 °F; 318–320 K) 2 mm Hg
- Except where otherwise noted, data are given for materials in their standard state (at 25 °C [77 °F], 100 kPa). Infobox references

Ethylene episulfoxide is the organosulfur compound with the formula C_{2}H_{4}SO. A colorless liquid, it is one of the simplest sulfoxides. Because it is a strained ring, ethylene sulfoxide is a highly reactive molecule, decomposing thermally to sulfur monoxide and ethylene. It is prepared by oxidation of ethylene sulfide with periodate.
