= Aminoethanol =

Aminoethanol may refer to:

- 1-Aminoethanol
- Ethanolamine (2-aminoethanol, ETA, or MEA)
