= 1-Aminoethanol =

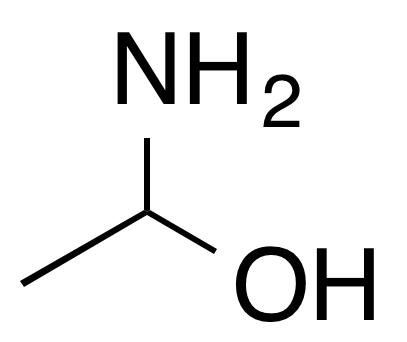

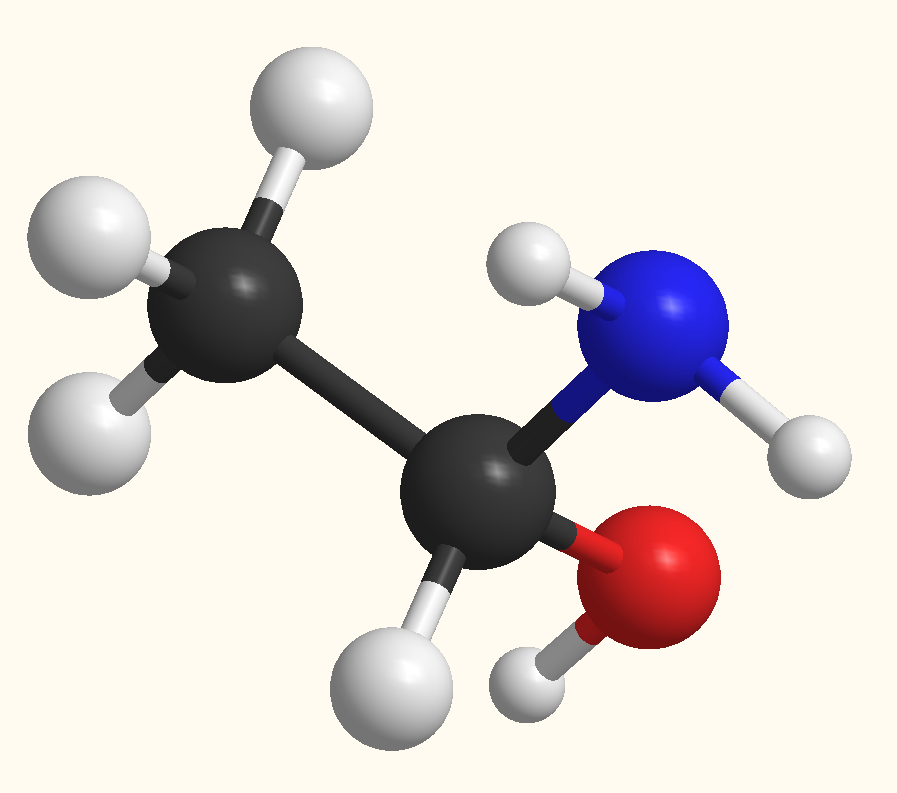

Names
- Preferred IUPAC name 1-Aminoethan-1-ol
- Other names 1-Aminoethanol; Acetaldehyde ammonia

Identifiers
CAS Number	75-39-8
3D model (JSmol)	Interactive image
ChemSpider	455852
ECHA InfoCard	100.000.790
EC Number	200-868-2
PubChem CID	522583
UNII	4J67Y8SM0K
CompTox Dashboard (EPA)	DTXSID60996495
- InChI: InChI=1S/C2H7NO/c1-2(3)4/h2,4H,3H2,1H3 Key: UJPKMTDFFUTLGM-UHFFFAOYSA-N
- SMILES: CC(N)O

Properties
Chemical formula	C_{2}H_{7}NO
Molar mass	61.084 g·mol^{−1}
- Except where otherwise noted, data are given for materials in their standard state (at 25 °C [77 °F], 100 kPa). Infobox references

1-Aminoethanol is an organic compound with the formula CH_{3}CH(NH_{2})OH. It is classified as an alkanolamine. Specifically, it is a structural isomer of 2-aminoethanol (ethanolamine). These two compounds differ in the position of the amino group. Since the central carbon atom in 1-aminoethanol has four different substituents, the compound has two stereoisomers. Unlike 2-aminoethanol, which is of considerable importance in commerce, 1-aminoethanol is not encountered as a pure material and is mainly of theoretical interest.

1-Aminoethanol exists in a solution of acetaldehyde and aqueous ammonia.

1-Aminoethanol is suggested as intermediate in Strecker reaction of alanine synthesis.

1-Aminoethanol was first prepared in 1833 by the German chemist Johann Wolfgang Döbereiner; its empirical formula was first determined by the German chemist Justus von Liebig in 1835. The structure of 1-aminoethanol remained unproven until 1877, when the German-Italian chemist Robert Schiff showed that the structure was CH_{3}CH(OH)NH_{2}.
