= Trisulfur =

Chemical compound

Trisulfur.png
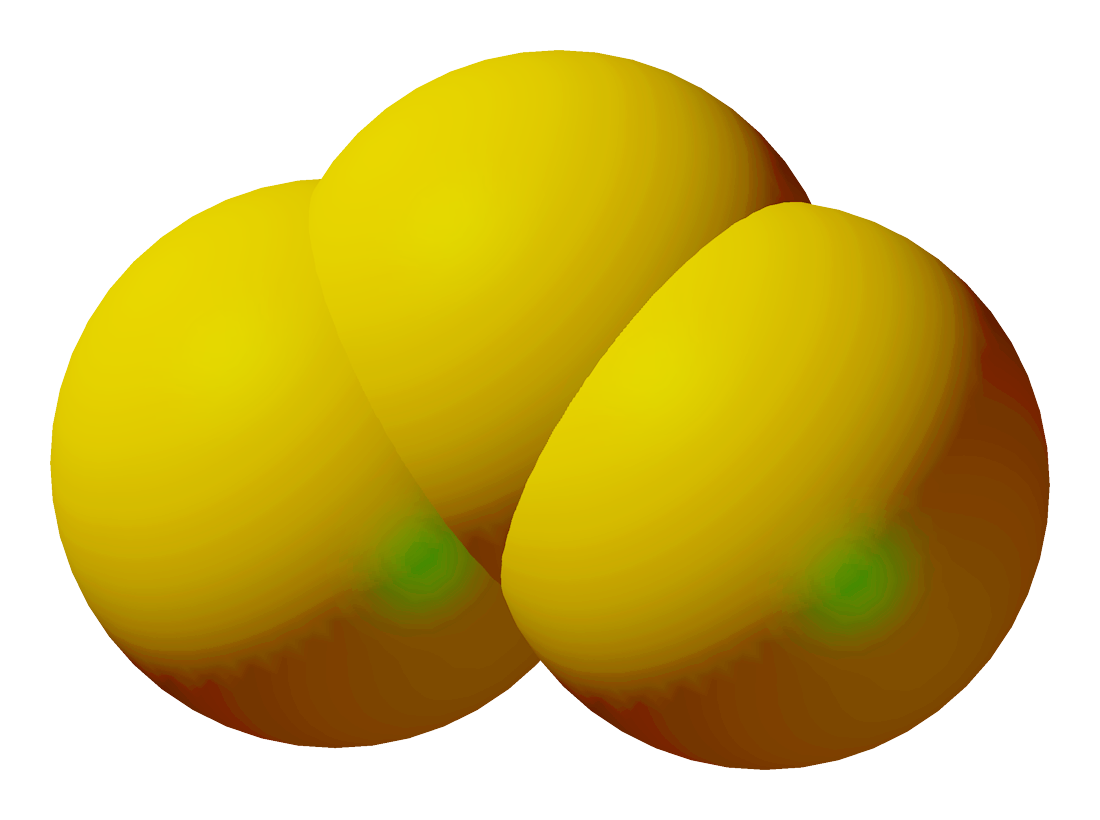
Ball-and-stick model of trisulfur

Names
- IUPAC name Trisulfur
- Other names Thiozone

Identifiers
CAS Number	12597-03-4
3D model (JSmol)	Interactive image; trisulfanidylo S_{3}^{−}: Interactive image
ChEBI	CHEBI:29388; trisulfanidylo S_{3}^{−}: CHEBI:29399
ChemSpider	62201
PubChem CID	139340; trisulfanidylo S_{3}^{−}: 5460598
CompTox Dashboard (EPA)	DTXSID00155004
- InChI: InChI=1S/S3/c1-3-2 Key: NVSDADJBGGUCLP-UHFFFAOYSA-N; trisulfanidylo S_{3}^{−}: InChI=1S/HS3/c1-3-2/h1H/p-1 Key: WMXWXNVGXOWZRJ-UHFFFAOYSA-M
- SMILES: [S-][S+]=S; trisulfanidylo S_{3}^{−}: [S-]S[S]

Properties
Chemical formula	S_{3}
Molar mass	96.198 g/mol
Appearance	Cherry-red

Structure
Molecular shape	bent

Related compounds
Related compounds	Ozone; Disulfur monoxide Sulfur dioxide
- Except where otherwise noted, data are given for materials in their standard state (at 25 °C [77 °F], 100 kPa). Infobox references

The S_{3} molecule, known as trisulfur, sulfur trimer, thiozone, or triatomic sulfur, is a cherry-red allotrope of sulfur. It comprises about 10% of vaporised sulfur at 713 K (440 °C; 824 °F) and 1,333 Pa (10.00 mmHg; 0.1933 psi). It has been observed at cryogenic temperatures as a solid. Under ordinary conditions it converts to cyclooctasulfur.

8 S_{3} → 3 S_{8}

== Structure and bonding ==
In terms of structure and bonding S_{3} and ozone (O_{3}) are similar. Both adopt bent structures and are diamagnetic. Although represented with S=S double bonds, the bonding situation is more complex.

The S–S distances are equivalent and are 191.70±0.01 pm, and with an angle at the central atom of 117.36°±0.006°. However, cyclic S_{3}, where the sulfur atoms are arranged in an equilateral triangle with three single bonds (similar to cyclic ozone and cyclopropane), is calculated to be higher in energy than the bent structure experimentally observed. A similar structure has been predicted for ozone, but has not been observed.

The name thiozone was invented by Hugo Erdmann in 1908 who hypothesized that S_{3} comprises a large proportion of liquid sulfur. However its existence was unproven until the experiments of J. Berkowitz in 1964. Using mass spectrometry, he showed that sulfur vapour contains the S_{3} molecule. Above 1,200 °C (2,190 °F) S_{3} is the second most common molecule after S_{2} in gaseous sulfur. In liquid sulfur the molecule is not common until the temperature is high, such as 500 °C (932 °F). However, small molecules like this contribute to most of the reactivity of liquid sulfur. S_{3} has an absorption peak of 425 nm (violet) with a tail extending into blue light.

S_{3} can also be generated by photolysis of S_{3}Cl_{2} embedded in a glass or matrix of solid noble gas.

== Natural occurrence ==
S_{3} occurs naturally on Io in volcanic emissions. S_{3} is also likely to appear in the atmosphere of Venus at heights of 20 to 30 km, where it is in thermal equilibrium with S_{2} and S_{4}. The reddish colour of Venus' atmosphere at lower levels is likely to be due to S_{3}.

== Reactions ==
S_{3} reacts with carbon monoxide to make carbonyl sulfide and S_{2}.

Formation of compounds with a defined number of sulfur atoms is possible:

S_{3} + S_{2}O → S_{5}O (cyclic)

== Radical anion ==
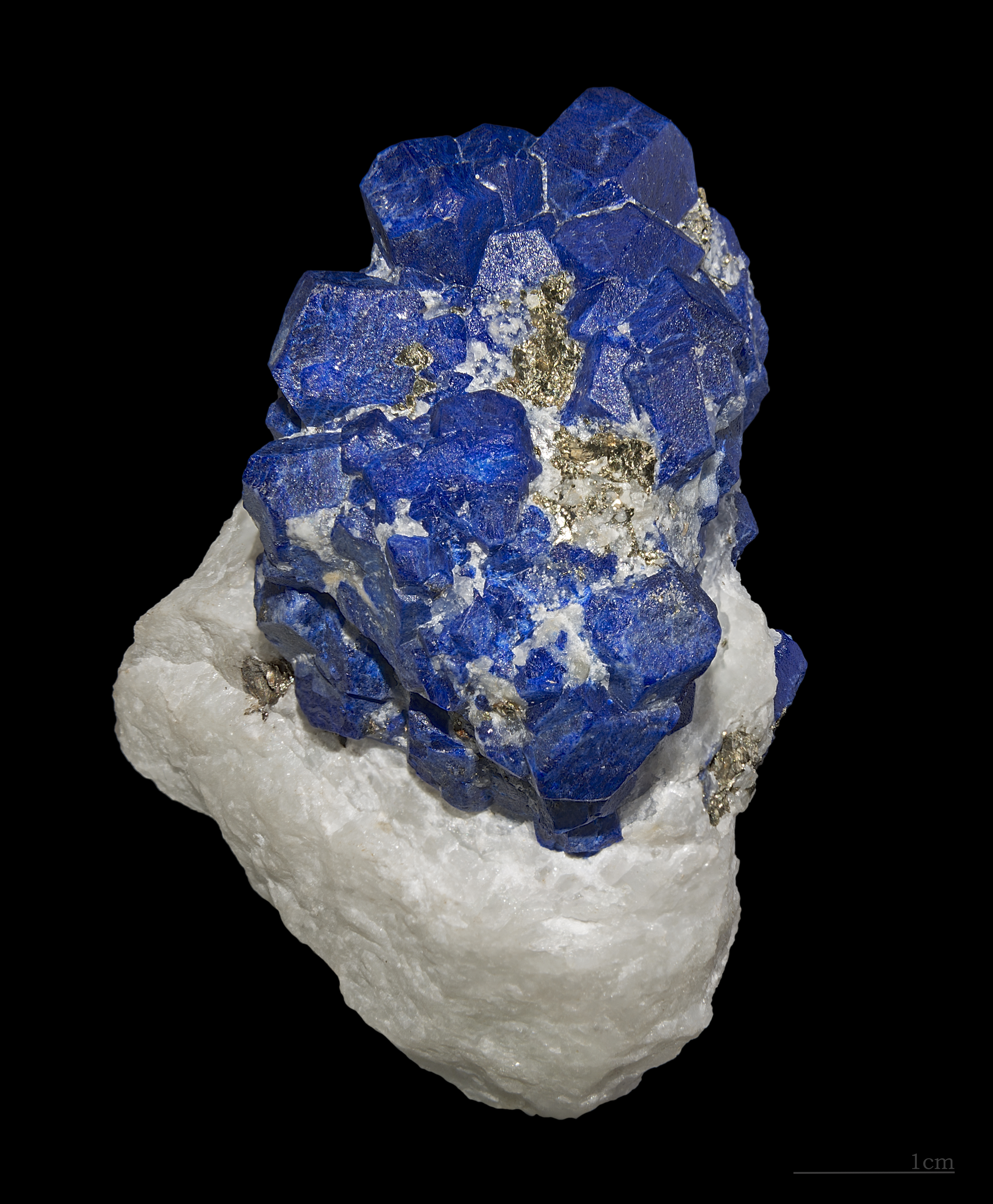
Lazurite contains S^{−}_{3}.

Although S_{3} is elusive under ordinary conditions, the intensely blue radical anion S^{−}_{3} is abundant. The anion is sometimes called thiozonide, by analogy with the ozonide anion, O^{−}_{3}, to which it is valence isoelectronic. The preferred IUPAC name is trisulfanidylo. The gemstone lapis lazuli and the mineral lazurite (from which the pigment ultramarine is derived) contain S^{−}_{3}. International Klein Blue, developed by Yves Klein, also contains the S^{−}_{3} radical anion. The blue colour is due to the C^{2}A_{2} transition to the X^{2}B_{1} electronic state in the ion, causing a strong absorption band at 610–620 nm or 2.07 eV (in the orange region of the visible spectrum). The Raman frequency is 523 cm^{−1} and another infrared absorption is at 580 cm^{−1}.

The S^{−}_{3} ion has been shown to be stable in aqueous solution under a pressure of 0.5 GPa (73,000 psi), and is expected to occur naturally at depth in the Earth's crust where subduction or high pressure metamorphism occurs. This ion is probably important in movement of copper and gold in hydrothermal fluids.

Lithium hexasulfide (which contains S^{−}_{6}, another polysulfide radical anion) with tetramethylenediamine solvation dissociates acetone and related donor solvents to S^{−}_{3}.

The S^{−}_{3} radical anion was also made by reducing gaseous sulfur with Zn^{2+} in a matrix. The material is strongly blue-coloured when dry and changes colour to green and yellow in the presence of trace amounts of water. Another way to make it is with polysulfide dissolved in hexamethylphosphoramide where it gives a blue colour.

Other methods of production of S^{−}_{3} include reacting sulfur with partially hydroxylated magnesium oxide at 400 °C.

Raman spectroscopy can be used to identify S^{−}_{3}, and it can be used non-destructively in paintings. The bands are 549 cm^{−1} for symmetric stretch, 585 cm^{−1} for asymmetric stretch, and 259 cm^{−1} for bending. Natural materials can also contain S^{−}_{2} which has an optical absorption at 390 nm and Raman band at 590 cm^{−1}.

== Trisulfide ion ==
The trisulfide ion, S^{2−}_{3} is part of the polysulfide series. The sulfur chain is bent at an angle of 107.88°. Strontium trisulfide (SrS_{3}) has a S–S bond length of 205 pm. The bonds are single. It is isoelectronic to sulfur dichloride.
