= Ozone =

Triatomic oxygen molecule

- Structural formula of ozone with partial charges shown

- Resonance structures of ozone with lone pairs indicated

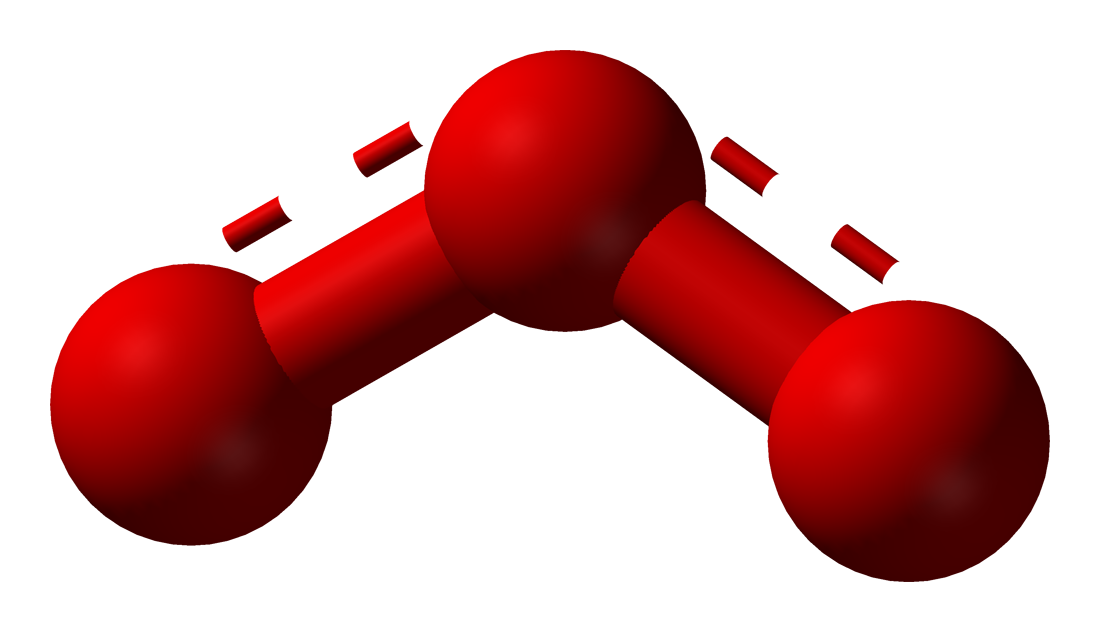
Ball and stick model of ozone
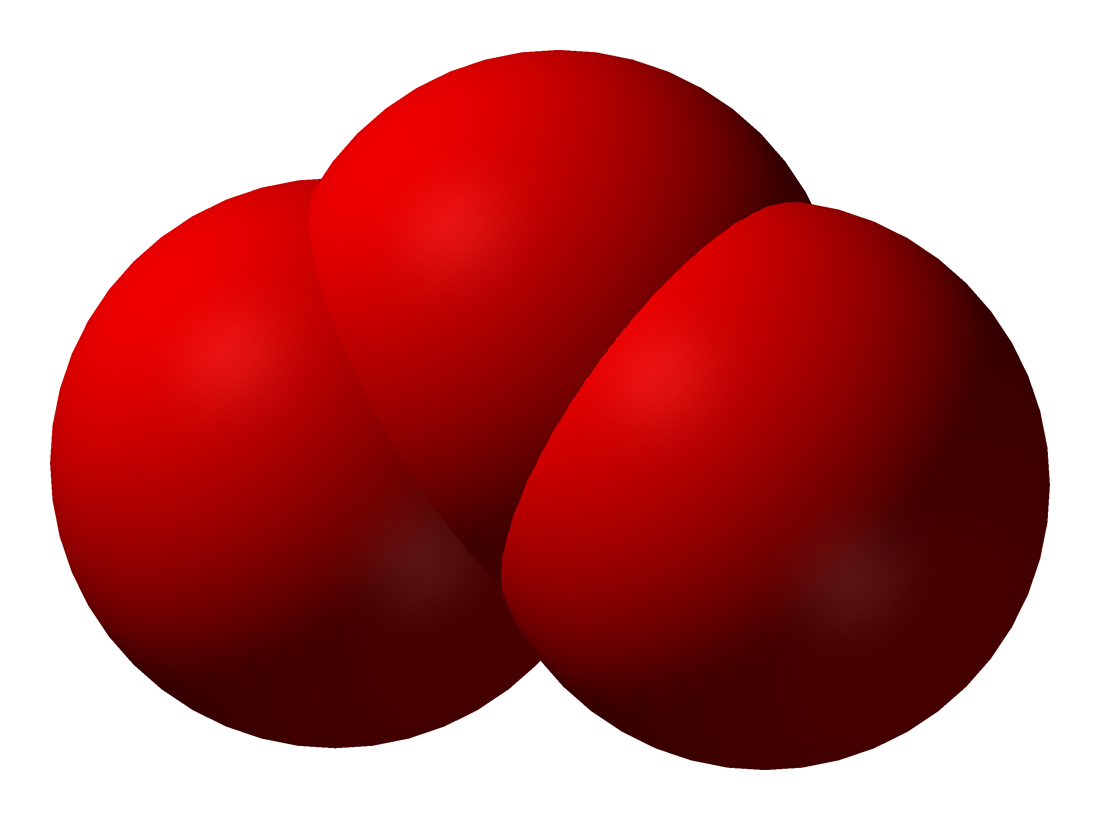
Spacefill model of ozone

Names
- IUPAC name Ozone
- Systematic IUPAC name Trioxygen
- Other names 2λ^{4}-trioxidiene; catena-trioxygen

Identifiers
CAS Number	10028-15-6
3D model (JSmol)	Interactive image
ChEBI	CHEBI:25812
ChemSpider	23208
ECHA InfoCard	100.030.051
EC Number	233–069–2
Gmelin Reference	1101
IUPHAR/BPS	6297
MeSH	Ozone
PubChem CID	24823
RTECS number	RS8225000
UNII	66H7ZZK23N
CompTox Dashboard (EPA)	DTXSID0021098
- InChI: InChI=1S/O3/c1-3-2 Key: CBENFWSGALASAD-UHFFFAOYSA-N; InChI=1/O3/c1-3-2 Key: CBENFWSGALASAD-UHFFFAOYAY
- SMILES: [O-][O+]=O

Properties
Chemical formula	O_{3}
Molar mass	47.997 g·mol^{−1}
Appearance	Colourless to pale blue gas
Odor	Pungent, metallic, dry
Density	2.144 g/L (at 0 °C)
Melting point	−192.2 °C; −313.9 °F; 81.0 K
Boiling point	−112 °C; −170 °F; 161 K
Solubility in water	1.05 g L^{−1} (at 0 °C)
Solubility in other solvents	Very soluble in CCl_{4}, sulfuric acid, Slightly soluble in water.
Vapor pressure	55.7 atm (−12.15 °C or 10.13 °F or 261.00 K) (Note: This vapor pressure is for the critical temperature, which is below room temperature.)
Conjugate acid	Protonated ozone
Magnetic susceptibility (χ)	+6.7·10^{−6} cm^{3}/mol
Refractive index (n_{D})	1.2226 (liquid), 1.00052 (gas, STP, 546 nm—note high dispersion)

Structure
Space group	C_{2v}
Coordination geometry	Digonal
Molecular shape	Dihedral
Hybridisation	sp^{2} for O1
Dipole moment	0.53 D

Thermochemistry
Std molar entropy (S^{⦵}_{298})	238.92 J K^{−1} mol^{−1}
Std enthalpy of formation (Δ_{f}H^{⦵}_{298})	142.67 kJ mol^{−1}

Hazards
- GHS labelling
Pictograms	(GHS01: Explosive) (GHS03: Oxidizing) (GHS04: Compressed Gas) (GHS05: Corrosive) (GHS06: Toxic) (GHS07: Exclamation mark) (GHS08: Health hazard) (GHS09: Environmental hazard)
Signal word	Danger
Hazard statements	H270, H314, H330, H335, H341, H361, H370, H410
Precautionary statements	P203, P220, P244, P260, P264+P265, P270, P271, P273, P280, P284, P301+P330+P331, P302+P361+P354, P304+P340, P305+P351+P338, P308+P316, P362+P364, P370+P376, P391, P403+P233, P405
NFPA 704 (fire diamond)	4 0 4 OX
- Lethal dose or concentration (LD, LC)
LC_{Lo} (lowest published)	12.6 ppm (mouse, 3 hr); 50 ppm (human, 30 min); 36 ppm (rabbit, 3 hr); 21 ppm (mouse, 3 hr); 21.8 ppm (rat, 3 hr); 24.8 ppm (guinea pig, 3 hr); 4.8 ppm (rat, 4 hr)
- NIOSH (US health exposure limits)
PEL (Permissible)	TWA 0.1 ppm (0.2 mg/m^{3})
REL (Recommended)	C 0.1 ppm (0.2 mg/m^{3})
IDLH (Immediate danger)	5 ppm

Related compounds
Related compounds	sulfur dioxide Trisulfur; Disulfur monoxide Cyclic ozone
- Except where otherwise noted, data are given for materials in their standard state (at 25 °C [77 °F], 100 kPa). verify (what is ?) Infobox references

Ozone (/ˈoʊzoʊn/), also called trioxygen, is an inorganic molecule with the chemical formula O_{3}. It is a pale-blue gas with a distinctively pungent odour. It is an allotrope of oxygen that is much less stable than the diatomic allotrope O_{2}, breaking down in the lower atmosphere to O_{2} (dioxygen). Ozone is formed from dioxygen by the action of ultraviolet (UV) light and electrical discharges within the Earth's atmosphere. It is present in very low concentrations throughout the atmosphere, with its highest concentration high in the ozone layer of the stratosphere, which absorbs most of the Sun's ultraviolet (UV) radiation.

Ozone's odour is reminiscent of chlorine or "electricity" and detectable by many people at concentrations of as little as 0.1 ppm in air. Ozone's O_{3} structure was determined in 1865. The molecule was later proven to have a bent structure and to be weakly diamagnetic. At standard temperature and pressure, ozone is a pale blue gas that condenses at cryogenic temperatures to a dark blue liquid and finally a violet-black solid. Ozone's instability with regard to more common dioxygen is such that both concentrated gas and liquid ozone may decompose explosively at elevated temperatures, physical shock, or fast warming to the boiling point. It is therefore used commercially only in low concentrations.

Ozone is a powerful oxidising agent (far more so than dioxygen) and has many industrial and consumer applications related to oxidation. This same high oxidising potential, however, causes ozone to damage mucous and respiratory tissues in animals, and also tissues in plants, above concentrations of about 0.1 ppm. While this makes ozone a potent respiratory hazard and pollutant near ground level, a higher concentration in the ozone layer (from two to eight ppm) is beneficial, preventing damaging UV light from reaching the Earth's surface.

== Nomenclature ==
The trivial name ozone is the most commonly used and preferred IUPAC name. The systematic names 2λ^{4}-trioxidiene and catena-trioxygen, valid IUPAC names, are constructed according to the substitutive and additive nomenclatures, respectively. The name ozone derives from ozon (ὄζον), the Greek neuter present participle of ozein (ὄζειν) "to smell", referring to ozone's distinctive smell.

In appropriate contexts, ozone can be viewed as trioxidane with two hydrogen atoms removed, and as such, trioxidanylidene may be used as a systematic name, according to substitutive nomenclature. By default, these names pay no regard to the radicality of the ozone molecule. In an even more specific context, this can also name the non-radical singlet ground state, whereas the diradical state is named trioxidanediyl. Trioxidanediyl is also used, non-systematically, to refer to the substituent group (-OOO-), also referred to as ozonide.

== History ==
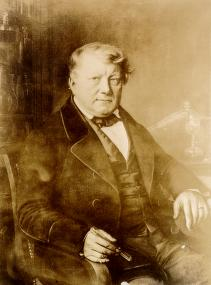
Christian Friedrich Schönbein (18 October 1799 – 29 August 1868)

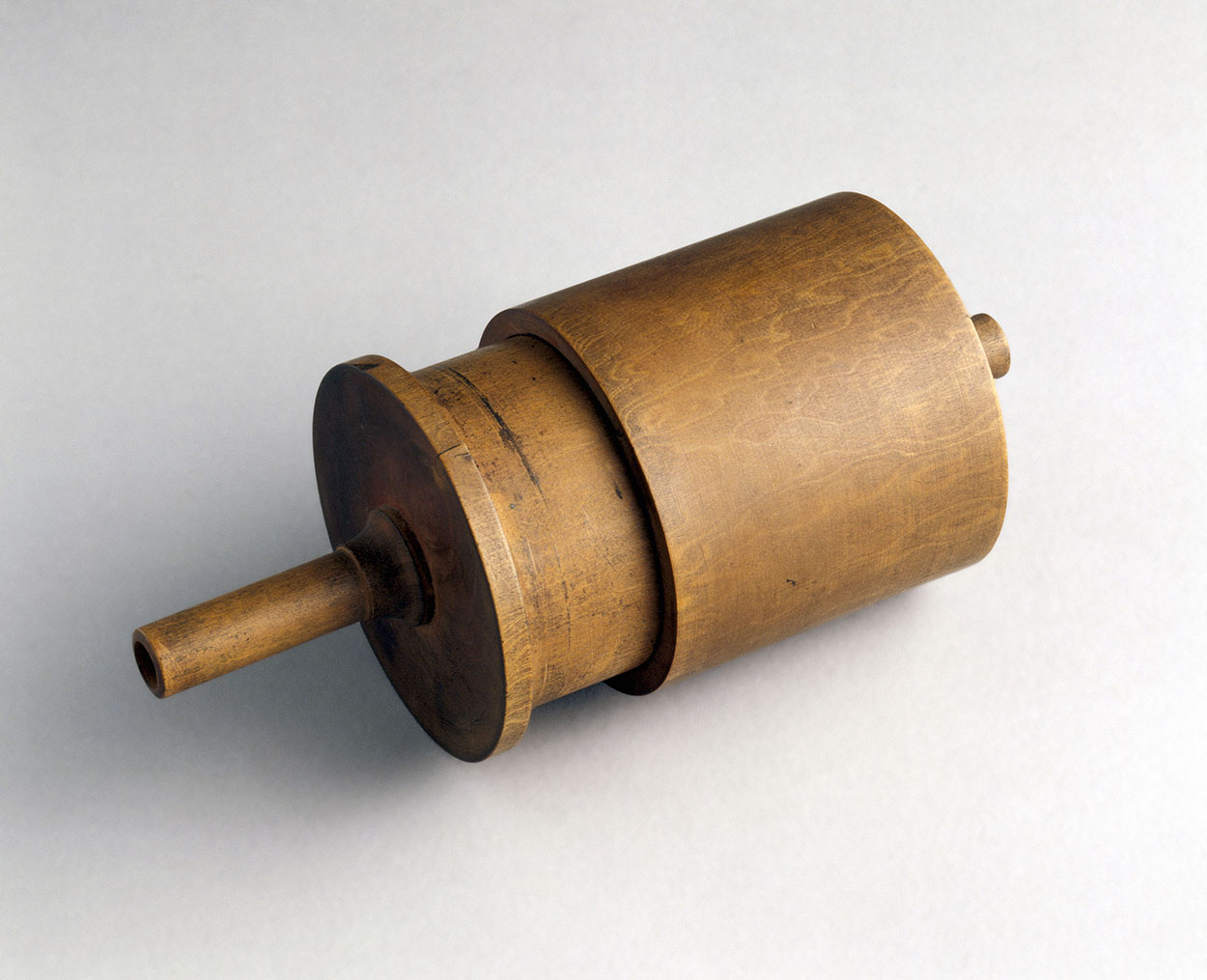
A prototype ozonometer built by John Smyth in 1865

In 1785, Dutch chemist Martinus van Marum was conducting experiments involving electrical sparking above water when he noticed an unusual smell, which he attributed to the electrical reactions, failing to realize that he had in fact produced ozone.

A half century later, Christian Friedrich Schönbein noticed the same pungent odour and recognized it as the smell often following a bolt of lightning. In 1839, he succeeded in isolating the gaseous chemical and named it "ozone", from the Greek word ozein (ὄζειν) meaning "to smell". For this reason, Schönbein is generally credited with the discovery of ozone. He also noted the similarity of ozone smell to the smell of phosphorus, and in 1844 proved that the product of reaction of white phosphorus with air is identical. A subsequent effort to call ozone "electrified oxygen" he ridiculed by proposing to call the ozone from white phosphorus "phosphorized oxygen". The chemical formula for ozone, O_{3}, was not determined until 1865 by Jacques-Louis Soret and confirmed by Schönbein in 1867.

For much of the second half of the 19th century and well into the 20th, ozone was considered a healthy component of the environment by naturalists and health-seekers. Beaumont, California, had as its official slogan "Beaumont: Zone of Ozone", as evidenced on postcards and Chamber of Commerce letterhead. Naturalists working outdoors often considered the higher elevations beneficial because of their ozone content which was readily monitored. "There is quite a different atmosphere [at higher elevation] with enough ozone to sustain the necessary energy [to work]", wrote naturalist Henry Henshaw, working in Hawaii. Seaside air was considered to be healthy because of its believed ozone content. The smell giving rise to this belief is in fact that of halogenated seaweed metabolites and dimethyl sulfide.

Much of ozone's appeal seems to have resulted from its "fresh" smell, which evoked associations with purifying properties. Scientists noted its harmful effects. In 1873 James Dewar and John Gray McKendrick documented that frogs grew sluggish, birds gasped for breath, and rabbits' blood showed decreased levels of oxygen after exposure to "ozonized air", which "exercised a destructive action". Schönbein himself reported that chest pains, irritation of the mucous membranes, and difficulty breathing occurred as a result of inhaling ozone, and small mammals died. In 1911, Leonard Hill and Martin Flack stated in the Proceedings of the Royal Society B that ozone's healthful effects "have, by mere iteration, become part and parcel of common belief; and yet exact physiological evidence in favour of its good effects has been hitherto almost entirely wanting ... The only thoroughly well-ascertained knowledge concerning the physiological effect of ozone, so far attained, is that it causes irritation and œdema of the lungs, and death if inhaled in relatively strong concentration for any time."

During World War I, ozone was tested at Queen Alexandra Military Hospital in London as a possible disinfectant for wounds. The gas was applied directly to wounds for as long as 15 minutes. This resulted in damage to both bacterial cells and human tissue. Other sanitizing techniques, such as irrigation with antiseptics, were found preferable.

Until the 1920s, it was not certain whether small amounts of oxozone, O_{4}, were also present in ozone samples due to the difficulty of applying analytical chemistry techniques to the explosive concentrated chemical. In 1923, Georg-Maria Schwab (working for his doctoral thesis under Ernst Hermann Riesenfeld) was the first to successfully solidify ozone and perform accurate analysis which conclusively refuted the oxozone hypothesis. Further hitherto unmeasured physical properties of pure concentrated ozone were determined by the Riesenfeld group in the 1920s.

== Physical properties ==
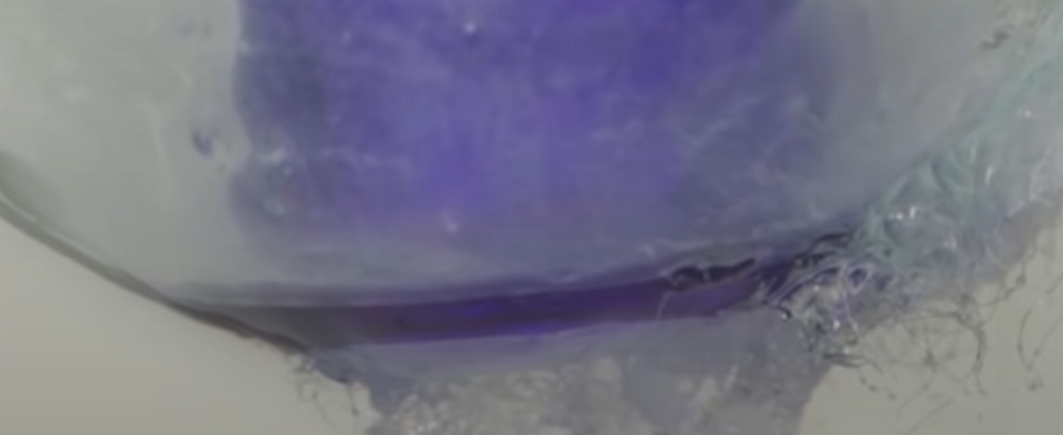
Liquid ozone

Ozone is a colourless or pale blue gas, slightly soluble in water, and much more soluble in inert non-polar solvents such as carbon tetrachloride or fluorocarbons, in which it forms a blue solution. At 161 K (−112 °C; −170 °F), it condenses to form a dark blue liquid. It is dangerous to allow this liquid to warm to its boiling point, because both concentrated gaseous ozone and liquid ozone can detonate. At temperatures below 80 K (−193.2 °C; −315.7 °F), it forms a violet-black solid.

Ozone has a very specific sharp odour somewhat resembling chlorine bleach. Most people can detect it at the 0.01 μmol/mol level in air. Exposure of 0.1 to 1 μmol/mol produces headaches and burning eyes and irritates the respiratory passages. Even low concentrations of ozone in air are very destructive to organic materials such as latex, plastics, and animal lung tissue.

The ozone molecule is weakly diamagnetic.

== Structure ==
According to experimental evidence from microwave spectroscopy, ozone is a bent molecule, with C_{2v} symmetry (similar to the water molecule). The O–O distances are 127.8 pm (1.278 Å) and the O–O–O angle is 116.78°. The central atom is sp² hybridized with one lone pair. Ozone is a polar molecule with a dipole moment of 0.53 D. The molecule can be represented as a resonance hybrid with two contributing structures, each with a single bond on one side and double bond on the other; this arrangement possesses an overall bond order of 1.5 for both sides. It is isoelectronic with the nitrite anion. Naturally occurring ozone can be composed of substituted isotopes (^{16}O, ^{17}O, ^{18}O). A cyclic form has been predicted but not observed.

Resonance Lewis structures of the ozone molecule

== Reactions ==
Ozone is among the most powerful oxidising agents known, far stronger than O_{2}. It is also unstable at high concentrations, decaying into ordinary diatomic oxygen. Its half-life varies with atmospheric conditions such as temperature, humidity, and air movement. Under laboratory conditions, the half-life will average ~1500 minutes (25 hours) in still air at room temperature (24 °C), zero humidity with zero air changes per hour.

2 O_{3} → 3 O_{2}

This reaction proceeds more rapidly with increasing temperature. Deflagration of ozone can be triggered by a spark and can occur in ozone concentrations of 10 wt% or higher.

Ozone can also be produced from oxygen at the anode of an electrochemical cell. This reaction can create smaller quantities of ozone for research purposes.

O_{3}(g) + 2 H^{+} + 2 e^{−} ⇌ O_{2}(g) + H_{2}O (E° = 2.075 V)

This can be observed as an unwanted reaction in a Hoffman apparatus during the electrolysis of water when the voltage is set above the necessary voltage.

=== With metals ===
Ozone oxidises most metals (except gold, platinum, and iridium) into oxides of the metals in their highest oxidation state. For example:

Cu + O_{3} → CuO + O_{2}
2 Ag + O_{3} → Ag_{2}O + O_{2}

=== With nitrogen and carbon compounds ===
Ozone oxidises nitric oxide to nitrogen dioxide:

NO + O_{3} → NO_{2} + O_{2}

This reaction is accompanied by chemiluminescence.

The NO_{2} can be further oxidised to nitrate radical:

NO_{2} + O_{3} → NO_{3} + O_{2}

The NO_{3} formed can react with NO_{2} to form dinitrogen pentoxide (N_{2}O_{5}).

Solid nitronium perchlorate can be made from NO_{2}, ClO_{2}, and O_{3} gases:

NO_{2} + ClO_{2} + 2 O_{3} → [NO_{2}]ClO_{4} + 2 O_{2}

Ozone does not react with ammonium salts, but it oxidises ammonia to ammonium nitrate:

2 NH_{3} + 4 O_{3} → [NH_{4}]NO_{3} + 4 O_{2} + H_{2}O

Ozone reacts with carbon to form carbon dioxide, even at room temperature:

C + 2 O_{3} → CO_{2} + 2 O_{2}

=== With sulfur compounds ===
Ozone oxidizes sulfides to sulfates. For example, lead(II) sulfide is oxidized to lead(II) sulfate:

PbS + 4 O_{3} → PbSO_{4} + 4 O_{2}

sulfuric acid can be produced from ozone, water and either elemental sulfur or sulfur dioxide:

S + H_{2}O + O_{3} → H_{2}SO_{4}
3 SO_{2} + 3 H_{2}O + O_{3} → 3 H_{2}SO_{4}

In the gas phase, ozone reacts with hydrogen sulfide to form sulfur dioxide:

H_{2}S + O_{3} → SO_{2} + H_{2}O

In an aqueous solution, however, two competing simultaneous reactions occur, one to produce elemental sulfur, and one to produce sulfuric acid:

H_{2}S + O_{3} → S + O_{2} + H_{2}O
3 H_{2}S + 4 O_{3} → 3 H_{2}SO_{4}

=== With alkenes and alkynes ===
Alkenes can be oxidatively cleaved by ozone, in a process called ozonolysis, giving alcohols, aldehydes, ketones, and carboxylic acids, depending on the second step of the workup.

General reaction equation of ozonolysis

Ozone can also cleave alkynes to form an acid anhydride or diketone product. If the reaction is performed in the presence of water, the anhydride hydrolyzes to give two carboxylic acids.

Usually ozonolysis is carried out in a solution of dichloromethane, at a temperature of −78 °C. After a sequence of cleavage and rearrangement, an organic ozonide (1,2,4-trioxolane) is formed. With reductive workup (e.g. zinc in acetic acid or dimethyl sulfide), ketones and aldehydes will be formed, with oxidative workup (e.g. aqueous or alcoholic hydrogen peroxide), carboxylic acids will be formed.

=== Other substrates ===
All three atoms of ozone may also react, as in the reaction of tin(II) chloride with hydrochloric acid and ozone:

3 SnCl_{2} + 6 HCl + O_{3} → 3 SnCl_{4} + 3 H_{2}O

Iodine(III) perchlorate can be made by treating iodine dissolved in cold anhydrous perchloric acid with ozone:

I_{2} + 6 HClO_{4} + O_{3} → 2 I(ClO_{4})_{3} + 3 H_{2}O

Ozone can also react with potassium iodide to give oxygen and iodine gas that can be titrated for quantitative determination:

2 KI + O_{3} + H_{2}O → 2 KOH + O_{2} + I_{2}

=== Combustion ===
Ozone can be used for combustion reactions and combustible gases; ozone provides higher temperatures than burning in dioxygen (O_{2}). The following is a reaction for the combustion of carbon subnitride which can also cause higher temperatures:

3 C_{4}N_{2} + 4 O_{3} → 12 CO + 3 N_{2}

Ozone can react at cryogenic temperatures. At 77 K (−196.2 °C; −321.1 °F), atomic hydrogen reacts with liquid ozone to form a hydrogen superoxide radical, which dimerizes:

H + O_{3} → HO_{2} + O
2 HO_{2} → H_{2}O_{4}

=== Ozone decomposition ===
==== Types of ozone decomposition ====
Ozone is a toxic substance, commonly found or generated in human environments (aircraft cabins, offices with photocopiers, laser printers, sterilisers, etc.).

The catalytic decomposition of ozone is very important to reduce pollution. This type of decomposition is the most widely used, especially with solid catalysts, and it has many advantages such as a higher conversion with a lower temperature. Furthermore, the product and the catalyst can be instantaneously separated, and this way the catalyst can be easily recovered without using any separation operation. The most-used materials in the catalytic decomposition of ozone in the gas phase are manganese dioxide, transition metals such as Mn, Co, Cu, Fe, Ni, or Ag, and noble metals such as Pt, Rh, or Pd.

Free radicals of chlorine (Cl^{·}), formed by the action of ultraviolet radiation on chlorofluorocarbons (CFCs) and sea salt, are known to catalyse the breakdown of ozone in the atmosphere.

There are two other possibilities for decomposing ozone in the gas phase:

- Thermal decomposition, in which the ozone is decomposed using only the action of heat. The problem is that this type of decomposition is very slow with temperatures below 250 °C. However, the decomposition rate can be increased working with higher temperatures but this would involve a high energy cost.
- Photochemical decomposition, which consists of radiating ozone with ultraviolet radiation (UV) and it gives rise to oxygen and radical peroxide.

==== Kinetics of ozone decomposition into molecular oxygen ====
The uncatalysed process of ozone decomposition in the gas phase is a complex reaction involving two elementary reactions that finally lead to molecular oxygen, and this means that the reaction order and the rate law cannot be determined by the stoichiometry of the overall reaction.

Overall reaction: $\ce{2 O3 -> 3 O2}$

Rate law (observed): $V = \frac{K_{obs} \cdot [\ce{O3}]^2}{[\ce{O2}]}$

where $K_{obs}$ is the observed rate constant and $V$ is the reaction rate. From the rate law above it can be determined that the partial order respect to molecular oxygen is −1 and respect to ozone is 2; therefore, the global reaction order is 1.

The first step is a unimolecular reaction wherein one molecule of ozone decomposes into two products (molecular oxygen and oxygen). The oxygen atom from the first step is a reactive intermediate because it participates as a reactant in the second step, which is a bimolecular reaction because there are two different reactants (ozone and oxygen) that give rise to molecular oxygen.

Step 1: Unimolecular reaction $\ce{O3 -> O2 + O}$

Step 2: Bimolecular reaction $\ce{O3 + O -> 2 O2}$

These two steps have different reaction rates and rate constants. The reaction rate laws for each of these steps are shown below:

$$V_1 = K_1 \cdot [\ce{O3}] \qquad V_2 = K_2 \cdot [\ce{O}] \cdot [\ce{O3}]$$

The following mechanism allows to explain the rate law of the ozone decomposition observed experimentally, and also it allows to determine the reaction orders with respect to ozone and oxygen, with which the overall reaction order will be determined.

The first step is assumed reversible and faster than the second reaction, which means that the slower rate determining step is the second reaction. This step determines the rate of product formation, and so $V=V_2$. However, this equation depends on the concentration of oxygen (intermediate), which does not appear in the observed rate law. Since the first step is a rapid equilibrium, the concentration of the intermediate can be determined as follows:

$$K_{eq} = \frac{K_1}{K_{-1}} = \frac{[\ce{O2}] \cdot [\ce{O}]}{[\ce{O3}]}$$
$$[\ce{O}] = \frac{K_1 \cdot [\ce{O3}]}{K_{-1} \cdot [\ce{O2}]}$$

Then using these equations, the formation rate of molecular oxygen is as shown below:

$$V={K_2 \cdot K_1 \cdot [\ce{O_3}]^2 \over K_{-1} \cdot [\ce{O_2}]}$$

The mechanism is consistent with the rate law observed experimentally if the rate constant (K_{obs}) is given in terms of the individual mechanistic steps' rate constants as follows:

$$V={K_\text{obs} \cdot [\ce{O_3}]^2 \over [\ce{O_2}]}$$

where $K_\text{obs}={K_{2} \cdot K_{1} \over K_{-1}}$

=== Reduction to ozonides ===
Reduction of ozone gives the ozonide anion, O^{−}_{3}. Derivatives of this anion are explosive and must be stored at cryogenic temperatures. Ozonides for all the alkali metals are known. KO_{3}, RbO_{3}, and CsO_{3} can be prepared from their respective superoxides:

KO_{2} + O_{3} → KO_{3} + O_{2}

Although KO_{3} can be formed as above, it can also be formed from potassium hydroxide and ozone:

2 KOH + 5 O_{3} → 2 KO_{3} + 5 O_{2} + H_{2}O

NaO_{3} and LiO_{3} must be prepared by action of CsO_{3} in liquid NH_{3} on an ion-exchange resin containing Na^{+} or Li^{+} ions:

CsO_{3} + Na^{+} → Cs^{+} + NaO_{3}

A solution of calcium in ammonia reacts with ozone to give ammonium ozonide and not calcium ozonide:

3 Ca + 10 NH_{3} + 6 O_{3} → Ca·6NH_{3} + Ca(OH)_{2} + Ca(NO_{3})_{2} + 2 [NH_{4}]^{+}[O_{3}]^{−} + 2 O_{2} + H_{2}

=== Applications ===
Ozone can be used to remove iron and manganese from water, forming a precipitate which can be filtered:

2 Fe^{2+} + O_{3} + 5 H_{2}O → 2 Fe(OH)_{3}(s) + O_{2} + 4 H^{+}
2 Mn^{2+} + 2 O_{3} + 4 H_{2}O → 2 MnO(OH)_{2}(s) + 2 O_{2} + 4 H^{+}

Ozone oxidizes dissolved hydrogen sulfide in water to sulfurous acid:

3 O_{3} + H_{2}S → H_{2}SO_{3} + 3 O_{2}

These three reactions are central in the use of ozone-based well-water treatment.

Ozone detoxifies cyanides by converting them to cyanates.

CN^{−} + O_{3} → CNO^{−} + O_{2}

Ozone completely decomposes urea:

(NH_{2})_{2}CO + O_{3} → N_{2} + CO_{2} + 2 H_{2}O

== Spectroscopic properties ==
Ozone is a bent triatomic molecule with three vibrational modes: the symmetric stretch (1103.157 cm^{−1}), bend (701.42 cm^{−1}) and antisymmetric stretch (1042.096 cm^{−1}). The symmetric stretch and bend are weak absorbers, but the antisymmetric stretch is strong and responsible for ozone being an important minor greenhouse gas. This IR band is also used to detect ambient and atmospheric ozone although UV-based measurements are more common.

The electromagnetic spectrum of ozone is quite complex. An overview can be seen at the MPI Mainz UV/VIS Spectral Atlas of Gaseous Molecules of Atmospheric Interest.

All of the bands are dissociative, meaning that the molecule falls apart to O + O_{2} after absorbing a photon. The most important absorption is the Hartley band, extending from slightly above 300 nm down to slightly above 200 nm. It is this band that is responsible for absorbing UV C in the stratosphere.

On the high wavelength side, the Hartley band transitions to the so-called Huggins band, which falls off rapidly until disappearing by ~360 nm. Above 400 nm, extending well out into the NIR, are the Chappius and Wulf bands. There, unstructured absorption bands are useful for detecting high ambient concentrations of ozone, but are so weak that they do not have much practical effect.

There are additional absorption bands in the far UV, which increase slowly from 200 nm down to reaching a maximum at ~120 nm.

== Ozone in Earth's atmosphere ==
The distribution of atmospheric ozone in partial pressure as a function of altitude

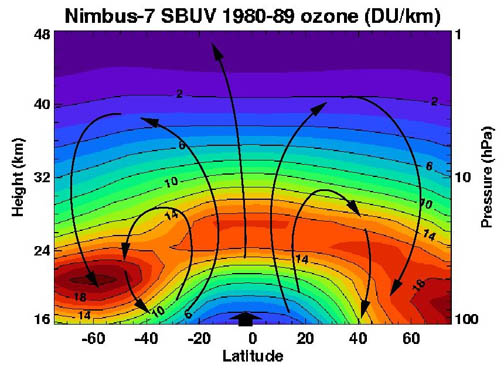
Concentration of ozone as measured by the Nimbus-7 satellite

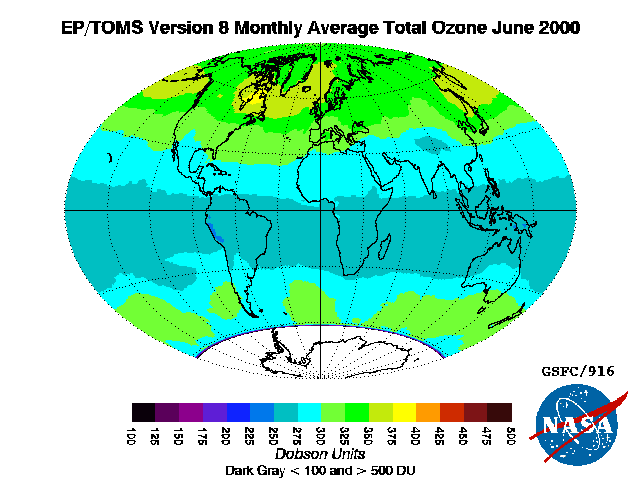
Total ozone concentration in June 2000 as measured by the NASA EP-TOMS satellite instrument

The standard way to express total ozone levels (the amount of ozone in a given vertical column) in the atmosphere is by using Dobson units. Point measurements are reported as mole fractions in nmol/mol (parts per billion, ppb) or as concentrations in μg/m^{3}. The study of ozone concentration in the atmosphere started in the 1920s.

=== Ozone layer ===
==== Location and production ====
The highest levels of ozone in the atmosphere are in the stratosphere, in a region also known as the ozone layer between about 10 and 50 km above the surface (or between about 6 and 31 miles). However, even in this "layer", the ozone concentrations are only two to eight parts per million, so most of the oxygen there is dioxygen, O_{2}, at about 210,000 parts per million by volume.

Ozone in the stratosphere is mostly produced from short-wave ultraviolet rays between 240 and 160 nm. Oxygen starts to absorb weakly at 240 nm in the Herzberg bands, but most of the oxygen is dissociated by absorption in the strong Schumann–Runge bands between 200 and 160 nm where ozone does not absorb. While shorter wavelength light, extending to even the X-Ray limit, is energetic enough to dissociate molecular oxygen, there is relatively little of it, and, the strong solar emission at Lyman-alpha, 121 nm, falls at a point where molecular oxygen absorption is a minimum.

The process of ozone creation and destruction is called the Chapman cycle and starts with the photolysis of molecular oxygen

$$\ce{O2 -> [\ce{photon}] [(\ce{radiation}\ \lambda\ <\ 240\ \ce{nm})] 2O}$$

followed by reaction of the oxygen atom with another molecule of oxygen to form ozone.

$$\ce{O + O2 + M -> O3 + M}$$

where "M" denotes the third body that carries off the excess energy of the reaction. The ozone molecule can then absorb a UV-C photon and dissociate

$$\ce{O3 -> O + O2} + \text{kinetic energy}$$

The excess kinetic energy heats the stratosphere when the O atoms and the molecular oxygen fly apart and collide with other molecules. This conversion of UV light into kinetic energy warms the stratosphere. The oxygen atoms produced in the photolysis of ozone then react back with other oxygen molecule as in the previous step to form more ozone. In the clear atmosphere, with only nitrogen and oxygen, ozone can react with the atomic oxygen to form two molecules of O_{2}:

$$\ce{O3 + O -> 2 O2}$$

An estimate of the rate of this termination step to the cycling of atomic oxygen back to ozone can be found simply by taking the ratios of the concentration of O_{2} to O_{3}. The termination reaction is catalysed by the presence of certain free radicals, of which the most important are hydroxyl (OH), nitric oxide (NO) and atomic chlorine (Cl) and bromine (Br). In the second half of the 20th century, the amount of ozone in the stratosphere was discovered to be declining, mostly because of increasing concentrations of chlorofluorocarbons (CFC) and similar chlorinated and brominated organic molecules. The concern over the health effects of the decline led to the 1987 Montreal Protocol, the ban on the production of many ozone-depleting chemicals and in the first and second decade of the 21st century the beginning of the recovery of stratospheric ozone concentrations.

==== Importance to surface-dwelling life on Earth ====
Levels of ozone at various altitudes and blocking of different bands of ultraviolet radiation. Essentially all UVC (100–280 nm) is blocked by dioxygen (at 100–200 nm) or by ozone (at 200–280 nm) in the atmosphere. The shorter portion of this band and even more energetic UV causes the formation of the ozone layer, when single oxygen atoms produced by UV photolysis of dioxygen (below 240 nm) react with more dioxygen. The ozone layer itself then blocks most, but not quite all, sunburn-producing UVB (280–315 nm). The band of UV closest to visible light, UVA (315–400 nm), is hardly affected by ozone, and most of it reaches the ground.

Ozone in the ozone layer filters out sunlight wavelengths from about 200 nm UV rays to 315 nm, with ozone peak absorption at about 250 nm. This ozone UV absorption is important to life, since it extends the absorption of UV by ordinary oxygen and nitrogen in air (which absorb all wavelengths < 200 nm) through the lower UV-C (200–280 nm) and the entire UV-B band (280–315 nm). The small unabsorbed part that remains of UV-B after passage through ozone causes sunburn in humans, and direct DNA damage in living tissues in both plants and animals. Ozone's effect on mid-range UV-B rays is illustrated by its effect on UV-B at 290 nm, which has a radiation intensity 350 million times as powerful at the top of the atmosphere as at the surface. Nevertheless, enough of UV-B radiation at similar frequency reaches the ground to cause some sunburn, and these same wavelengths are also among those responsible for the production of vitamin D in humans.

The ozone layer has little effect on the longer UV wavelengths called UV-A (315–400 nm), but this radiation does not cause sunburn or direct DNA damage. While UV-A probably does cause long-term skin damage in certain humans, it is not as dangerous to plants and to the health of surface-dwelling organisms on Earth in general (see ultraviolet for more information on near ultraviolet).

=== Ground-level ozone ===
Ground-level ozone (or tropospheric ozone) is an atmospheric pollutant. It is not emitted directly by car engines or by industrial operations, but formed by the reaction of sunlight on air containing hydrocarbons and nitrogen oxides that react to form ozone directly at the source of the pollution or many kilometres downwind.

Ozone reacts directly with some hydrocarbons such as aldehydes and thus begins their removal from the air, but the products are themselves key components of smog. Ozone photolysis by UV light leads to production of the hydroxyl radical HO• and this plays a part in the removal of hydrocarbons from the air, but is also the first step in the creation of components of smog such as peroxyacyl nitrates, which can be powerful eye irritants. The atmospheric lifetime of tropospheric ozone is about 22 days; its main removal mechanisms are being deposited to the ground, the above-mentioned reaction giving HO•, and by reactions with OH and the peroxy radical HO_{2}•.

There is evidence of significant reduction in agricultural yields because of increased ground-level ozone and pollution which interferes with photosynthesis, stunts overall growth and metabolism of some plant species. The United States Environmental Protection Agency (EPA) has proposed a secondary regulation to reduce crop damage, in addition to the primary regulation designed for the protection of human health.

==== Ground-level ozone in urban areas ====
Certain examples of cities with elevated ozone readings are Denver, Colorado; Houston, Texas; and Mexico City, Mexico. Houston has a reading of around 41 nmol/mol, while Mexico City is far more hazardous, with a reading of about 125 nmol/mol.

Ground-level ozone, or tropospheric ozone, is the most concerning type of ozone pollution in urban areas and is increasing in general. Ozone pollution in urban areas affects denser populations, and is worsened by high populations of vehicles, which emit NO_{2} and volatile organic compounds (VOCs), the main pollutants contributing to problematic ozone levels. Ozone pollution in urban areas is especially concerning with increasing temperatures, raising heat-related mortality during heat waves. During heat waves in urban areas, ground level ozone pollution can be 20% higher than usual. Ozone pollution in urban areas reaches higher levels of exceedance in the summer and autumn, which may be explained by patterns of weather and traffic.

As mentioned above, Denver, Colorado, is one of the many cities in the U.S. that have high amounts of ozone. According to the American Lung Association, the Denver–Aurora area is the 14th most ozone-polluted area in the U.S. The problem of high ozone levels is not new to this area. In 2004, the EPA allotted the Denver Metro/North Front Range (Note: This includes Adams, Arapahoe, Boulder, Broomfield, Denver, Douglas, Jefferson, and parts of Larimer and Weld counties.) as non-attainment areas per 1997's 8-hour ozone standard, but later deferred this status until 2007. The non-attainment standard indicates that an area does not meet the EPA's air quality standards. The Colorado Ozone Action Plan was created in response, and numerous changes were implemented from this plan. The first major change was that car emission testing was expanded across the state to more counties that did not previously mandate emissions testing, like areas of Larimer and Weld County. There have also been changes made to decrease emissions of nitrogen oxides (NOx) and VOCs, which should help lower ozone levels.

One large contributor to high ozone levels in the area is the oil and natural gas industry situated in the Denver-Julesburg Basin (DJB) which overlaps with a majority of Colorado's metropolitan areas. Ozone is produced naturally in the Earth's stratosphere, but is also produced in the troposphere from human efforts. Briefly mentioned above, NOx and VOCs react with sunlight to create ozone through a process called photochemistry. One hour elevated ozone events (<75 ppb) "occur during June–August indicating that elevated ozone levels are driven by regional photochemistry". According to an article from the University of Colorado-Boulder, "Oil and natural gas VOC emission have a major role in ozone production and bear the potential to contribute to elevated O_{3} levels in the Northern Colorado Front Range (NCFR)". Using complex analyses to research wind patterns and emissions from large oil and natural gas operations, the authors concluded that "elevated O_{3} levels in the NCFR are predominantly correlated with air transport from N– ESE, which are the upwind sectors where the O&NG operations in the Wattenberg Field area of the DJB are located".

Contained in the Colorado Ozone Action Plan, created in 2008, plans exist to evaluate "emission controls for large industrial sources of NOx" and "statewide control requirements for new oil and gas condensate tanks and pneumatic valves". In 2011, the Regional Haze Plan was released that included a more specific plan to help decrease NOx emissions. These efforts are increasingly difficult to implement and take many years to come to pass. Of course there are also other reasons that ozone levels remain high. These include: a growing population meaning more car emissions, and the mountains along the NCFR that can trap emissions. If interested, daily air quality readings can be found at the Colorado Department of Public Health and Environment's website. As noted earlier, Denver continues to experience high levels of ozone to this day. It will take many years and a systems-thinking approach to combat this issue of high ozone levels in the Front Range of Colorado.

==== Ozone cracking ====
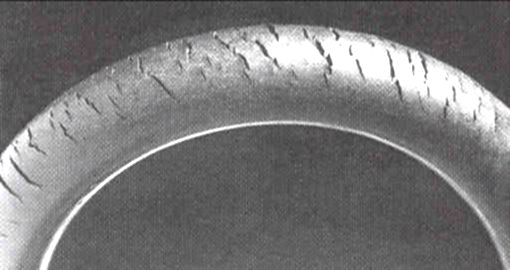
Ozone cracking in natural rubber tubing

Ozone gas attacks any polymer possessing olefinic or double bonds within its chain structure, such as natural rubber, nitrile rubber, and styrene-butadiene rubber. Products made using these polymers are especially susceptible to attack, which causes cracks to grow longer and deeper with time, the rate of crack growth depending on the load carried by the rubber component and the concentration of ozone in the atmosphere. Such materials can be protected by adding antiozonants, such as waxes, which bond to the surface to create a protective film or blend with the material and provide long term protection. Ozone cracking used to be a serious problem in car tyres, for example, but it is not an issue with modern tyres. On the other hand, many critical products, like gaskets and O-rings, may be attacked by ozone produced within compressed-air systems. Fuel lines made of reinforced rubber are also susceptible to attack, especially within the engine compartment, where some ozone is produced by electrical components. Storing rubber products in close proximity to a DC electric motor can accelerate ozone cracking. The commutator of the motor generates sparks which in turn produce ozone.

=== Ozone as a greenhouse gas ===
Ozone with an anthropogenic "fingerprint" contributes to global warming and climate change, especially when present in the upper troposphere.

Although ozone was present at ground level before the Industrial Revolution, peak concentrations are now far higher than the pre-industrial levels, and even background concentrations well away from sources of pollution are substantially higher. Ozone acts as a greenhouse gas, absorbing some of the infrared energy emitted by the earth. Quantifying the greenhouse gas potency of ozone is difficult because it is not present in uniform concentrations across the globe. However, the most widely accepted scientific assessments relating to climate change (e.g. the Intergovernmental Panel on Climate Change Third Assessment Report) suggest that the radiative forcing of tropospheric ozone is about 25% that of carbon dioxide.

The annual global warming potential of tropospheric ozone is between 918 and 1022 tons carbon dioxide equivalent/tons tropospheric ozone. This means on a per-molecule basis, ozone in the troposphere has a radiative forcing effect roughly 1,000 times as strong as carbon dioxide. However, tropospheric ozone is a short-lived greenhouse gas, which decays in the atmosphere much more quickly than carbon dioxide. This means that over a 20-year span, the global warming potential of tropospheric ozone is much less, roughly 62 to 69 tons carbon dioxide equivalent / ton tropospheric ozone.

Because of its short-lived nature, tropospheric ozone does not have strong global effects, but has very strong radiative forcing effects on regional scales. In fact, there are regions of the world where tropospheric ozone has a radiative forcing up to 150% of carbon dioxide. For example, ozone increase in the troposphere is shown to be responsible for ~30% of upper Southern Ocean interior warming between 1955 and 2000.

== Carbon filtering ==
Filters containing an adsorbent or catalyst such as charcoal (carbon) may be used to remove odours and gaseous pollutants such as volatile organic compounds or ozone.

== Health effects ==
Death rate from ozone pollution

Ozone is an acutely toxic gas.

For the last few decades, scientists studied the effects of acute and chronic ozone exposure on human health. Hundreds of studies suggest that ozone is harmful to people at levels currently found in urban areas. Ozone has been shown to affect the respiratory, cardiovascular and central nervous system. Early death and problems in reproductive health and development are also shown to be associated with ozone exposure.

=== Vulnerable populations ===
The American Lung Association has identified five populations who are especially vulnerable to the effects of breathing ozone:

1. Children and teens
2. People 65 years old and older
3. People who work or exercise outdoors
4. People with existing lung diseases, such as asthma and chronic obstructive pulmonary disease (also known as COPD, which includes emphysema and chronic bronchitis)
5. People with cardiovascular disease

Additional evidence suggests that women, those with obesity, and low-income populations may also face higher risk from ozone, although more research is needed.

=== Acute ozone exposure ===
Acute ozone exposure ranges from hours to a few days. Because ozone is a gas, it directly affects the lungs and the entire respiratory system. Inhaled ozone causes inflammation and acute—but reversible—changes in lung function, as well as airway hyperresponsiveness. These changes lead to shortness of breath, wheezing, and coughing which may exacerbate lung diseases, like asthma or chronic obstructive pulmonary disease (COPD) resulting in the need to receive medical treatment. Acute and chronic exposure to ozone has been shown to cause an increased risk of respiratory infections, due to the following mechanism.

Multiple studies have been conducted to determine the mechanism behind ozone's harmful effects, particularly in the lungs. These studies have shown that exposure to ozone causes changes in the immune response within the lung tissue, resulting in disruption of both the innate and adaptive immune response, as well as altering the protective function of lung epithelial cells. It is thought that these changes in immune response and the related inflammatory response are factors that likely contribute to the increased risk of lung infections, and worsening or triggering of asthma and reactive airways after exposure to ground-level ozone pollution.

The innate (cellular) immune system consists of various chemical signals and cell types that work broadly and against multiple pathogen types, typically bacteria or foreign bodies/substances in the host. The cells of the innate system include phagocytes, neutrophils, both thought to contribute to the mechanism of ozone pathology in the lungs, as the functioning of these cell types have been shown to change after exposure to ozone. Macrophages, cells that serve the purpose of eliminating pathogens or foreign material through the process of "phagocytosis", have been shown to change the level of inflammatory signals they release in response to ozone, either up-regulating and resulting in an inflammatory response in the lung, or down-regulating and reducing immune protection. Neutrophils, another important cell type of the innate immune system that primarily targets bacterial pathogens, are found to be present in the airways within 6 hours of exposure to high ozone levels. Despite high levels in the lung tissues, however, their ability to clear bacteria appears impaired by exposure to ozone.

The adaptive immune system is the branch of immunity that provides long-term protection via the development of antibodies targeting specific pathogens and is also impacted by high ozone exposure. Lymphocytes, a cellular component of the adaptive immune response, produce an increased amount of inflammatory chemicals called "cytokines" after exposure to ozone, which may contribute to airway hyperreactivity and worsening asthma symptoms.

The airway epithelial cells also play an important role in protecting individuals from pathogens. In normal tissue, the epithelial layer forms a protective barrier, and also contains specialized ciliary structures that work to clear foreign bodies, mucus and pathogens from the lungs. When exposed to ozone, the cilia become damaged and mucociliary clearance of pathogens is reduced. Furthermore, the epithelial barrier becomes weakened, allowing pathogens to cross the barrier, proliferate and spread into deeper tissues. Together, these changes in the epithelial barrier help make individuals more susceptible to pulmonary infections.

Inhaling ozone not only affects the immune system and lungs, but it may also affect the heart as well. Ozone causes short-term autonomic imbalance leading to changes in heart rate and reduction in heart rate variability; and high-level exposure for as little as one hour results in a supraventricular arrhythmia in the elderly, both increase the risk of premature death and stroke. Ozone may also lead to vasoconstriction resulting in increased systemic arterial pressure contributing to increased risk of cardiac morbidity and mortality in patients with pre-existing cardiac diseases.

=== Chronic ozone exposure ===
Breathing ozone for periods longer than eight hours at a time for weeks, months or years defines chronic exposure. Numerous studies suggest a serious impact on the health of various populations from this exposure.

One study finds significant positive associations between chronic ozone and all-cause, circulatory, and respiratory mortality with 2%, 3%, and 12% increases in risk per 10 ppb and report an association (95% CI) of annual ozone and all-cause mortality with a hazard ratio of 1.02 (1.01–1.04), and with cardiovascular mortality of 1.03 (1.01–1.05). A similar study finds similar associations with all-cause mortality and even larger effects for cardiovascular mortality. An increased risk of mortality from respiratory causes is associated with long-term chronic exposure to ozone.

Chronic ozone has detrimental effects on children, especially those with asthma. The risk for hospitalization in children with asthma increases with chronic exposure to ozone; younger children and those with low-income status are even at greater risk.

Adults suffering from respiratory diseases (asthma, COPD, lung cancer) are at a higher risk of mortality and morbidity and critically ill patients have an increased risk of developing acute respiratory distress syndrome with chronic ozone exposure as well.

=== Ozone produced by air cleaners ===
Ozone generators sold as air cleaners intentionally produce the gas ozone. These are often marketed to control indoor air pollution, and use misleading terms to describe ozone. Some examples are describing it as "energized oxygen" or "pure air", suggesting that ozone is a healthy or "better" kind of oxygen. However, according to the EPA, "There is evidence to show that at concentrations that do not exceed public health standards, ozone is not effective at removing many odor-causing chemicals", and "If used at concentrations that do not exceed public health standards, ozone applied to indoor air does not effectively remove viruses, bacteria, mold, or other biological pollutants.". Furthermore, another report states that "results of some controlled studies show that concentrations of ozone considerably higher than these [human safety] standards are possible even when a user follows the manufacturer's operating instructions".

The California Air Resources Board has a page listing air cleaners (many with ionizers) meeting their indoor ozone limit of 0.050 parts per million. From that article:

All portable indoor air cleaning devices sold in California must be certified by the California Air Resources Board (CARB). To be certified, air cleaners must be tested for electrical safety and ozone emissions, and meet an ozone emission concentration limit of 0.050 parts per million. For more information about the regulation, visit the air cleaner regulation.

=== Ozone air pollution ===
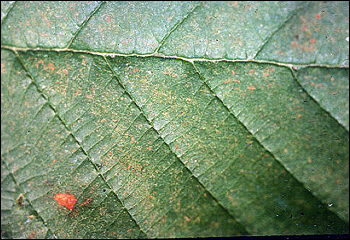
Red Alder leaf, showing discolouration caused by ozone pollution

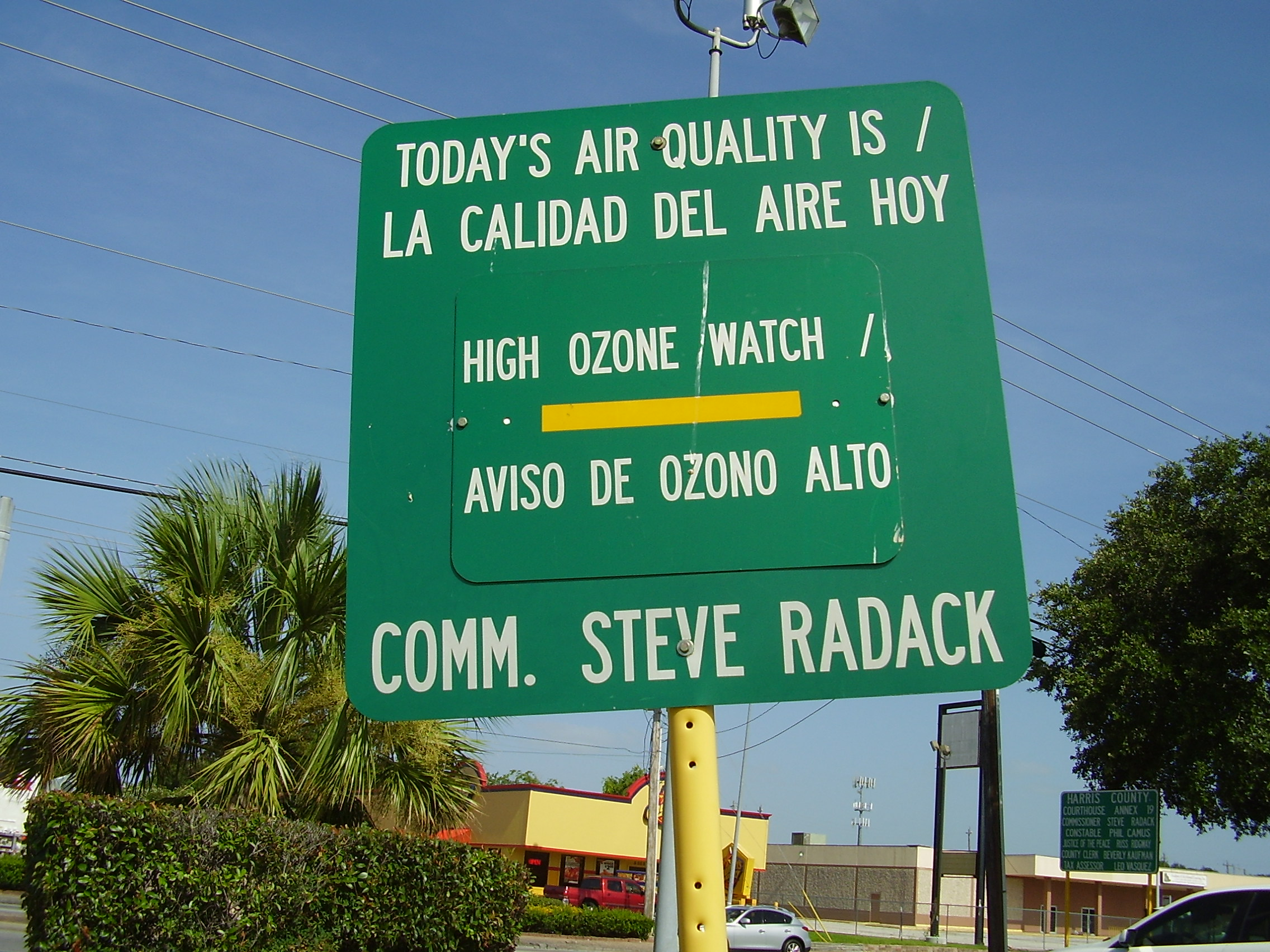
Signboard in Gulfton, Houston indicating an ozone watch

Ozone precursors are a group of pollutants, predominantly those emitted during the combustion of fossil fuels. Ground-level ozone pollution (tropospheric ozone) is produced near the Earth's surface by the action of daylight UV rays on these precursors. The ozone at ground level is primarily from fossil fuel precursors, but methane is a natural precursor, and the very low natural background level of ozone at ground level is considered safe. This section examines the health impacts of fossil fuel burning, which raises ground level ozone far above background levels.

There is a great deal of evidence to show that ground-level ozone can harm lung function and irritate the respiratory system. Exposure to ozone (and the pollutants that produce it) is linked to premature death, asthma, bronchitis, heart attack, and other cardiopulmonary problems.

Long-term exposure to ozone has been shown to increase risk of death from respiratory illness. A study of 450,000 people living in U.S. cities saw a significant correlation between ozone levels and respiratory illness over the 18-year follow-up period. The study revealed that people living in cities with high ozone levels, such as Houston or Los Angeles, had an over 30% increased risk of dying from lung disease.

Air quality guidelines such as those from the World Health Organization, the U.S. Environmental Protection Agency (EPA), and the European Union are based on detailed studies designed to identify the levels that can cause measurable ill health effects.

According to researchers with the EPA, susceptible people can be adversely affected by ozone levels as low as 40 nmol/mol. In the EU, the current target value for ozone concentrations is 120 μg/m^{3} which is about 60 nmol/mol. This target applies to all member states in accordance with Directive 2008/50/EC. Ozone concentration is measured as a maximum daily mean of 8 hour averages and the target should not be exceeded on more than 25 calendar days per year, starting from January 2010. While the directive requires in the future a strict compliance with 120 μg/m^{3} limit (i.e. mean ozone concentration not to be exceeded on any day of the year), there is no date set for this requirement and this is treated as a long-term objective.

In the US, the Clean Air Act directs the EPA to set National Ambient Air Quality Standards for several pollutants, including ground-level ozone, and counties out of compliance with these standards are required to take steps to reduce their levels. In May 2008, under a court order, the EPA lowered its ozone standard from 80 nmol/mol to 75 nmol/mol. The move proved controversial, since the Agency's own scientists and advisory board had recommended lowering the standard to 60 nmol/mol. Many public health and environmental groups also supported the 60 nmol/mol standard, and the World Health Organization recommends 100 μg/m^{3} (51 nmol/mol).

On January 7, 2010, the U.S. Environmental Protection Agency (EPA) announced proposed revisions to the National Ambient Air Quality Standard (NAAQS) for the pollutant ozone, the principal component of smog:

... EPA proposes that the level of the 8-hour primary standard, which was set at 0.075 μmol/mol in the 2008 final rule, should instead be set at a lower level within the range of 0.060 to 0.070 μmol/mol, to provide increased protection for children and other at risk populations against an array of O_{3} – related adverse health effects that range from decreased lung function and increased respiratory symptoms to serious indicators of respiratory morbidity including emergency department visits and hospital admissions for respiratory causes, and possibly cardiovascular-related morbidity as well as total non- accidental and cardiopulmonary mortality ...

On October 26, 2015, the EPA published a final rule with an effective date of December 28, 2015, that revised the 8-hour primary NAAQS from 0.075 ppm to 0.070 ppm.

The EPA has developed an air quality index (AQI) to help explain air pollution levels to the general public. Under the current standards, eight-hour average ozone mole fractions of 85 to 104 nmol/mol are described as "unhealthy for sensitive groups", 105 nmol/mol to 124 nmol/mol as "unhealthy", and 125 nmol/mol to 404 nmol/mol as "very unhealthy".

Ozone can also be present in indoor air pollution, partly as a result of electronic equipment such as photocopiers. A connection has also been known to exist between the increased pollen, fungal spores, and ozone caused by thunderstorms and hospital admissions of asthma sufferers.

In the Victorian era, one British folk myth held that the smell of the sea was caused by ozone. In fact, the characteristic "smell of the sea" is caused by dimethyl sulfide, a chemical generated by phytoplankton. Victorian Britons considered the resulting smell "bracing".

==== Heat waves ====
An investigation to assess the joint mortality effects of ozone and heat during the European heat waves in 2003, concluded that these appear to be additive.

=== Physiology ===
Ozone, along with other reactive forms of oxygen such as superoxide, singlet oxygen, hydrogen peroxide, and hypochlorite ions, is produced by white blood cells and other biological systems (such as the roots of marigolds) as a means of destroying foreign bodies. Ozone reacts directly with organic double bonds. Also, when ozone breaks down to dioxygen it gives rise to oxygen free radicals, which are highly reactive and capable of damaging many organic molecules. Moreover, it is believed that the powerful oxidizing properties of ozone may be a contributing factor of inflammation. The cause-and-effect relationship of how the ozone is created in the body and what it does is still under consideration and still subject to various interpretations, since other body chemical processes can trigger some of the same reactions. There is evidence linking the antibody-catalyzed water-oxidation pathway of the human immune response to the production of ozone. In this system, ozone is produced by antibody-catalyzed production of trioxidane from water and neutrophil-produced singlet oxygen.

When inhaled, ozone reacts with compounds lining the lungs to form specific, cholesterol-derived metabolites that are thought to facilitate the build-up and pathogenesis of atherosclerotic plaques (a form of heart disease). These metabolites have been confirmed as naturally occurring in human atherosclerotic arteries and are categorized into a class of secosterols termed atheronals, generated by ozonolysis of cholesterol's double bond to form a 5,6 secosterol as well as a secondary condensation product via aldolization.

=== Impact on plant growth and crop yields ===
Ozone has been implicated to have an adverse effect on plant growth: "... ozone reduced total chlorophylls, carotenoid and carbohydrate concentration, and increased 1-aminocyclopropane-1-carboxylic acid (ACC) content and ethylene production. In treated plants, the ascorbate leaf pool was decreased, while lipid peroxidation and solute leakage were significantly higher than in ozone-free controls. The data indicated that ozone triggered protective mechanisms against oxidative stress in citrus." Studies that have used pepper plants as a model have shown that ozone decreased fruit yield and changed fruit quality. Furthermore, it was also observed a decrease in chlorophylls levels and antioxidant defences on the leaves, as well as increased the reactive oxygen species (ROS) levels and lipid and protein damages.

A 2022 study concludes that East Asia loses 63 billion dollars in crops per year due to ozone pollution, a byproduct of fossil fuel combustion. China loses about one-third of its potential wheat production and one-fourth of its rice production.

=== Safety regulations ===
Because of the strongly oxidizing properties of ozone, ozone is a primary irritant, affecting especially the eyes and respiratory systems and can be hazardous at even low concentrations. The Canadian Centre for Occupation Safety and Health reports that:

Even very low concentrations of ozone can be harmful to the upper respiratory tract and the lungs. The severity of injury depends on both the concentration of ozone and the duration of exposure. Severe and permanent lung injury or death could result from even a very short-term exposure to relatively low concentrations."

To protect workers potentially exposed to ozone, U.S. Occupational Safety and Health Administration has established a permissible exposure limit (PEL) of 0.1 μmol/mol (29 CFR 1910.1000 table Z-1), calculated as an 8-hour time weighted average. Higher concentrations are especially hazardous and NIOSH has established an Immediately dangerous to life or health limit (IDLH) of 5 μmol/mol. Work environments where ozone is used or where it is likely to be produced should have adequate ventilation and it is prudent to have a monitor for ozone that will alarm if the concentration exceeds the OSHA PEL. Continuous monitors for ozone are available from several suppliers.

Elevated ozone exposure can occur on passenger aircraft, with levels depending on altitude and atmospheric turbulence. U.S. Federal Aviation Administration regulations set a limit of 250 nmol/mol with a maximum four-hour average of 100 nmol/mol. Some planes are equipped with ozone converters in the ventilation system to reduce passenger exposure.

== Production ==
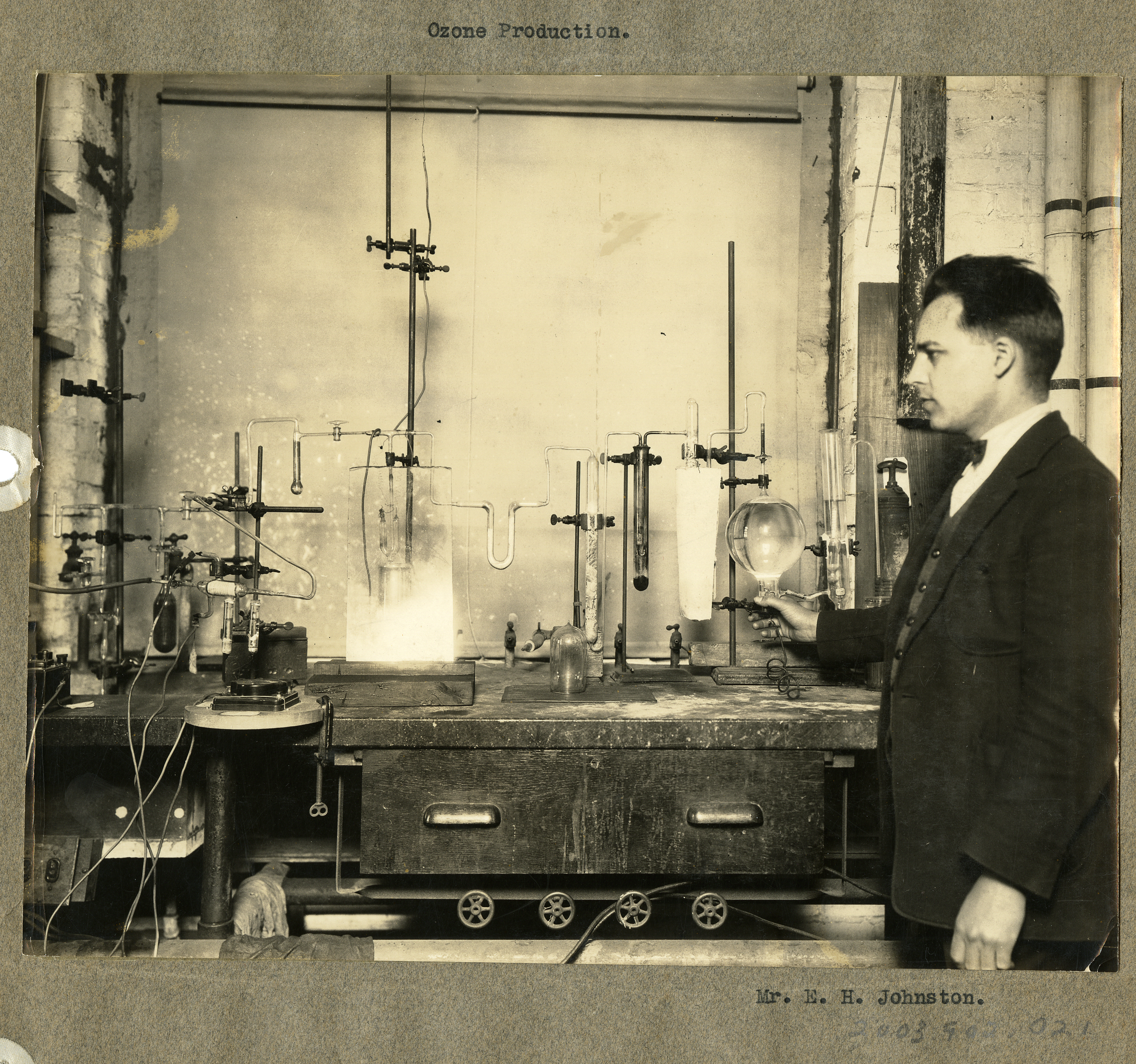
Ozone production demonstration, Fixed Nitrogen Research Laboratory, 1926

Ozone generators, or ozonators, are used to produce ozone for cleaning air or removing smoke odours in unoccupied rooms. These ozone generators can produce over 3 g of ozone per hour. Ozone often forms in nature under conditions where O_{2} will not react. Ozone used in industry is measured in μmol/mol (ppm, parts per million), nmol/mol (ppb, parts per billion), μg/m^{3}, mg/h (milligrams per hour) or weight percent. The regime of applied concentrations ranges from 1% to 5% (in air) and from 6% to 14% (in oxygen) for older generation methods. New electrolytic methods can achieve up 20% to 30% dissolved ozone concentrations in output water.

Temperature and humidity play a large role in how much ozone is being produced using traditional generation methods (such as corona discharge and ultraviolet light). Old generation methods will produce less than 50% of nominal capacity if operated with humid ambient air, as opposed to very dry air. New generators, using electrolytic methods, can achieve higher purity and dissolution through using water molecules as the source of ozone production.

=== Corona discharge method ===
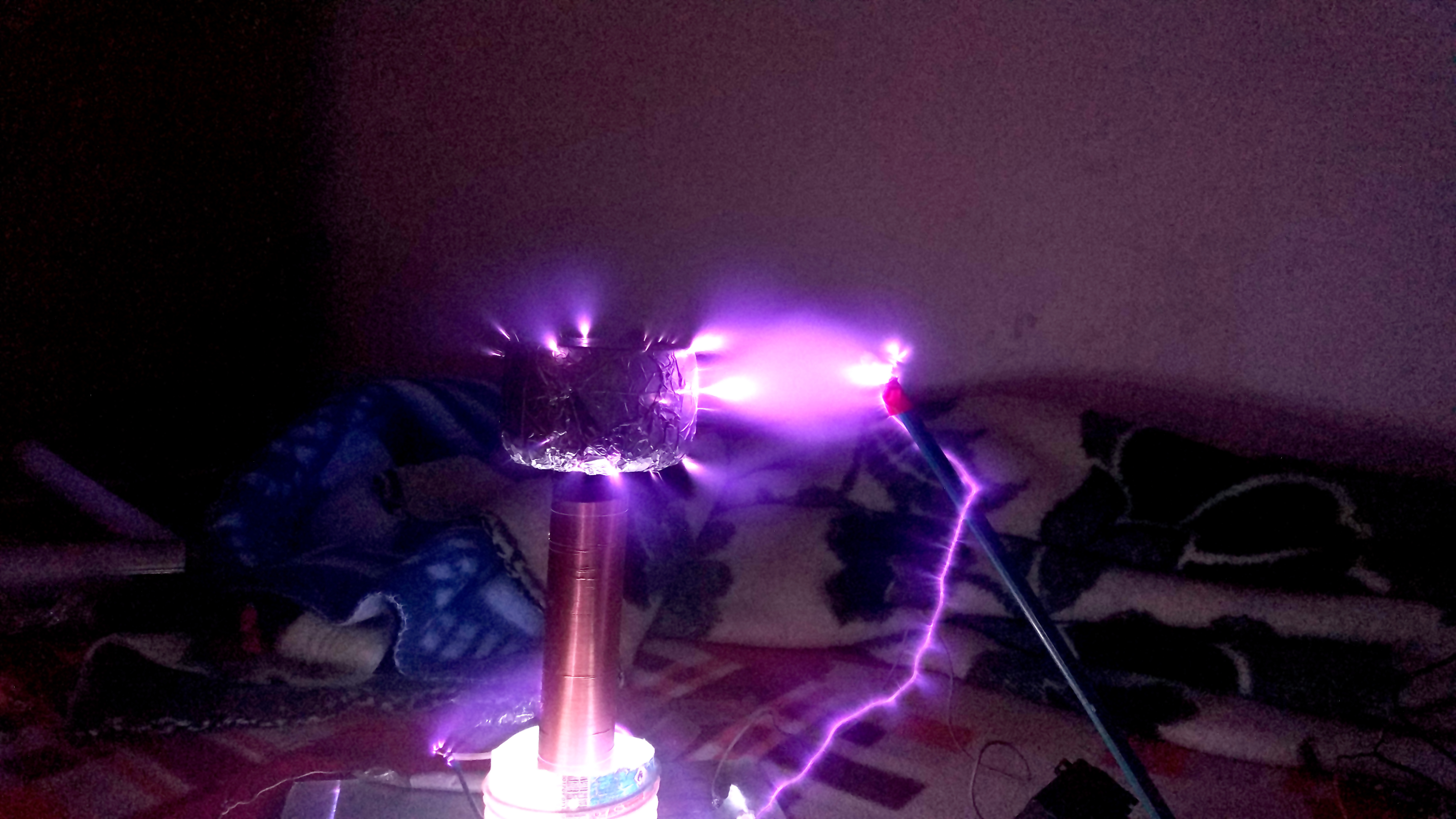
Homemade Tesla coil. Ozone is produced in the corona discharge.

This is the most common type of ozone generator for most industrial and personal uses. While variations of the "hot spark" corona discharge method of ozone production exist, including medical grade and industrial grade ozone generators, these units usually work by means of a corona discharge tube or ozone plate. They are typically cost-effective and do not require an oxygen source other than the ambient air to produce ozone concentrations of 3–6%. Fluctuations in ambient air, due to weather or other environmental conditions, cause variability in ozone production. However, they also produce nitrogen oxides as a by-product. Use of an air dryer can reduce or eliminate nitric acid formation by removing water vapour and increase ozone production. At room temperature, nitric acid will form into a vapour that is hazardous if inhaled. Symptoms can include chest pain, shortness of breath, headaches and a dry nose and throat causing a burning sensation. Use of an oxygen concentrator can further increase the ozone production and further reduce the risk of nitric acid formation by removing not only the water vapour, but also the bulk of the nitrogen.

=== Ultraviolet light ===
UV ozone generators, or vacuum-ultraviolet (VUV) ozone generators, employ a light source that generates a narrow-band ultraviolet light, a subset of that produced by the Sun. The Sun's UV sustains the ozone layer in the stratosphere of Earth.

UV ozone generators use ambient air for ozone production, no air prep systems are used (air dryer or oxygen concentrator), therefore these generators tend to be less expensive. However, UV ozone generators usually produce ozone with a concentration of about 0.5% or lower which limits the potential ozone production rate. Another disadvantage of this method is that it requires the ambient air (oxygen) to be exposed to the UV source for a longer amount of time, and any gas that is not exposed to the UV source will not be treated. This makes UV generators impractical for use in situations that deal with rapidly moving air or water streams (in-duct air sterilisation, for example). Production of ozone is one of the potential dangers of ultraviolet germicidal irradiation. VUV ozone generators are used in swimming pools and spa applications ranging to millions of gallons of water. VUV ozone generators, unlike corona discharge generators, do not produce harmful nitrogen by-products and work extremely well in humid air environments. There is also not normally a need for expensive off-gas mechanisms, and no need for air driers or oxygen concentrators which require extra costs and maintenance.

=== Cold plasma ===
In the cold plasma method, pure oxygen gas is exposed to a plasma created by dielectric barrier discharge. The diatomic oxygen is split into single atoms, which then recombine in triplets to form ozone.

It is common in the industry to mislabel some DBD ozone generators as CD Corona Discharge generators. Typically all solid flat metal electrode ozone generators produce ozone using the dielectric barrier discharge method. Cold plasma machines use pure oxygen as the input source and produce a maximum concentration of about 24% ozone. They produce far greater quantities of ozone in a given time compared to ultraviolet production that has about 2% efficiency. The discharges manifest as filamentary transfer of electrons (micro discharges) in a gap between two electrodes. In order to evenly distribute the micro discharges, a dielectric insulator must be used to separate the metallic electrodes and to prevent arcing.

=== Electrolytic ===
Electrolytic ozone generation (EOG) splits water molecules into H_{2}, O_{2}, and O_{3}.

In most EOG methods, the hydrogen gas will be removed to leave oxygen and ozone as the only reaction products. Therefore, EOG can achieve higher dissolution in water without other competing gases found in corona discharge method, such as nitrogen gases present in ambient air. This method of generation can achieve concentrations of 20–30% and is independent of air quality because water is used as the source material. Production of ozone electrolytically is typically unfavourable because of the high overpotential required to produce ozone as compared to oxygen. This is why ozone is not produced during typical water electrolysis. However, it is possible to increase the overpotential of oxygen by careful catalyst selection such that ozone is preferentially produced under electrolysis. Catalysts typically chosen for this approach are lead dioxide or boron-doped diamond.

The ozone-to-oxygen ratio is improved by increasing current density at the anode, cooling the electrolyte around the anode close to 0 °C, using an acidic electrolyte (such as dilute sulfuric acid) instead of a basic solution, and by applying pulsed current instead of DC.

=== Special considerations ===
Ozone cannot be stored and transported like other industrial gases (because it quickly decays into diatomic oxygen) and must therefore be produced on site. Available ozone generators vary in the arrangement and design of the high-voltage electrodes. At production capacities higher than 20 kg per hour, a gas/water tube heat-exchanger may be utilised as ground electrode and assembled with tubular high-voltage electrodes on the gas-side. The regime of typical gas pressures is around 2 bars (200 kPa) absolute in oxygen and 3 bars (300 kPa) absolute in air. Several megawatts of electrical power may be installed in large facilities, applied as single phase AC current at 50 to 8000 Hz and peak voltages between 3,000 and 20,000 volts. Applied voltage is usually inversely related to the applied frequency.

The dominating parameter influencing ozone generation efficiency is the gas temperature, which is controlled by cooling water temperature and/or gas velocity. The cooler the water, the better the ozone synthesis. The lower the gas velocity, the higher the concentration (but the lower the net ozone produced). At typical industrial conditions, almost 90% of the effective power is dissipated as heat and needs to be removed by a sufficient cooling water flow.

Because of the high reactivity of ozone, only a few materials may be used like stainless steel (quality 316L), titanium, aluminium (as long as no moisture is present), glass, polytetrafluorethylene, or polyvinylidene fluoride. Viton may be used with the restriction of constant mechanical forces and absence of humidity (humidity limitations apply depending on the formulation). Hypalon may be used with the restriction that no water comes in contact with it, except for normal atmospheric levels. Embrittlement or shrinkage is the common mode of failure of elastomers with exposure to ozone. Ozone cracking is the common mode of failure of elastomer seals like O-rings.

Silicone rubbers are usually adequate for use as gaskets in ozone concentrations below 1 wt%, such as in equipment for accelerated aging of rubber samples.

=== Incidental production ===
Ozone may be formed from O_{2} by electrical discharges and by action of high energy electromagnetic radiation. Unsuppressed arcing in electrical contacts, motor brushes, or mechanical switches breaks down the chemical bonds of the atmospheric oxygen surrounding the contacts [O_{2} -> 2O]. Free radicals of oxygen in and around the arc recombine to create ozone [O_{3}]. Certain electrical equipment generate significant levels of ozone. This is especially true of devices using high voltages, such as ionic air purifiers, laser printers, photocopiers, tasers, and arc welders. Electric motors using brushes can generate ozone from repeated sparking inside the unit. Large motors that use brushes, such as those used by elevators or hydraulic pumps, will generate more ozone than smaller motors.

Ozone is similarly formed in the Catatumbo lightning storms phenomenon on the Catatumbo River in Venezuela, though ozone's instability makes it dubious that it has any effect on the ozonosphere. It is the world's largest single natural generator of ozone, lending calls for it to be designated a UNESCO World Heritage Site.

=== Laboratory production ===
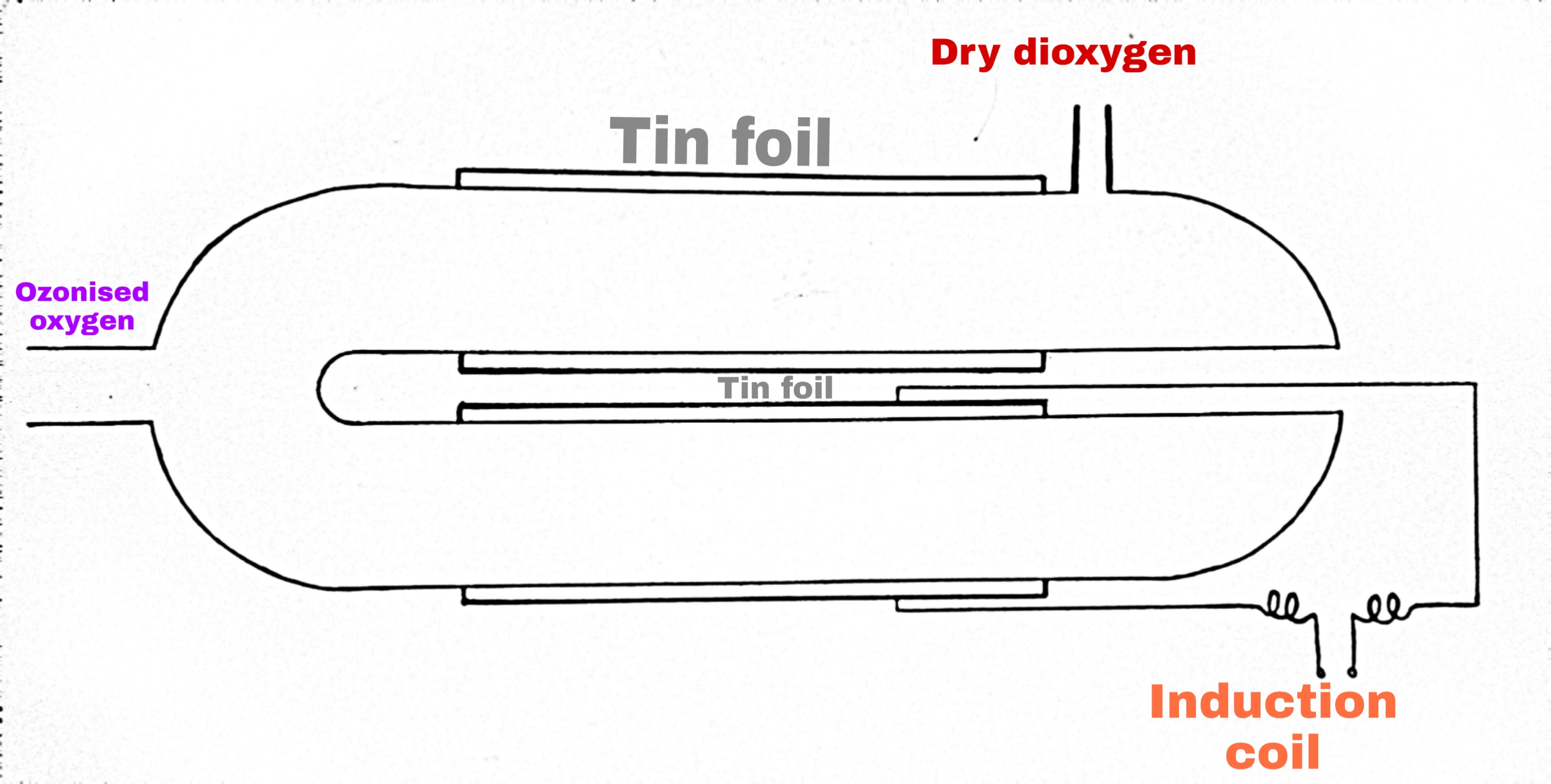
A laboratory method for the preparation of ozone by using a Siemen's ozoniser

In the laboratory, ozone can be produced by electrolysis using a 9 volt battery, a pencil graphite rod cathode, a platinum wire anode, and a 3 molar sulfuric acid electrolyte. The half cell reactions taking place are:

$$\begin{align}
& \ce{3 H2O -> O3 + 6 H+ + 6 e-} && (\Delta E^\circ=-\text{1.53 V}) \\
& \ce{6 H+ + 6 e- -> 3 H2} && (\Delta E^\circ=\text{0 V}) \\
& \ce{2 H2O -> O2 + 4 H+ + 4 e-} && (\Delta E^\circ=\text{1.23 V})
\end{align}$$

where E° represents the standard electrode potential.

In the net reaction, three equivalents of water are converted into one equivalent of ozone and three equivalents of hydrogen. Oxygen formation is a competing reaction.

It can also be generated by a high voltage arc. In its simplest form, high voltage AC, such as the output of a neon-sign transformer is connected to two metal rods with the ends placed sufficiently close to each other to allow an arc. The resulting arc will convert atmospheric oxygen to ozone.

It is often desirable to contain the ozone. This can be done with an apparatus consisting of two concentric glass tubes sealed together at the top with gas ports at the top and bottom of the outer tube. The inner core should have a length of metal foil inserted into it connected to one side of the power source. The other side of the power source should be connected to another piece of foil wrapped around the outer tube. A source of dry O_{2} is applied to the bottom port. When high voltage is applied to the foil leads, electricity will discharge between the dry dioxygen in the middle and form O_{3} and O_{2} which will flow out the top port. This is called a Siemen's ozoniser. The reaction can be summarized as follows:

$$\ce{3O2 ->[\text{electricity}] 2O3}$$

== Applications ==
=== Industry ===
The largest use of ozone is in the preparation of pharmaceuticals, synthetic lubricants, and many other commercially useful organic compounds, where it is used to sever carbon-carbon bonds. It can also be used for bleaching substances and for killing microorganisms in air and water sources. Many municipal drinking water systems kill bacteria with ozone instead of the more common chlorine as their primary disinfectant. Because ozone decays quickly and leaves no residual, chlorine or chloramines must still be added to maintain a disinfectant residual in the distribution system. Ozone has a very high oxidation potential. Ozone does not form organochlorine compounds, nor does it remain in the water after treatment. Ozone can form the suspected carcinogen bromate in source water with high bromide concentrations. Where electrical power is abundant, ozone is a cost-effective method of treating water, since it is produced on demand and does not require transportation and storage of hazardous chemicals. Once it has decayed, it leaves no taste or odour in drinking water.

Although low levels of ozone have been advertised to be of some disinfectant use in residential homes, the concentration of ozone in dry air required to have a rapid, substantial effect on airborne pathogens exceeds safe levels recommended by the U.S. Occupational Safety and Health Administration and Environmental Protection Agency. Humidity control can vastly improve both the killing power of the ozone and the rate at which it decays back to oxygen (more humidity allows more effectiveness). Spore forms of most pathogens are very tolerant of atmospheric ozone in concentrations at which asthma patients start to have issues.

In 1908 artificial ozonisation of the Central Line of the London Underground was introduced for aerial disinfection. The process was found to be worthwhile, but was phased out by 1956. However the beneficial effect was maintained by the ozone created incidentally from the electrical discharges of the train motors (see above: Incidental production).

Ozone generators were made available to schools and universities in Wales for the Autumn term 2021, to disinfect classrooms after COVID-19 outbreaks.

Industrially, ozone is used to:

- Disinfect laundry in hospitals, food factories, care homes, etc.
- Disinfect water in place of chlorine
- Deodorise air and objects, such as after a fire
- Kill bacteria on food or on contact surfaces
- Replace chemical sanitizers such as peracetic acid, hypochlorite or heat in water-intense industries such as breweries and dairy plants
- Disinfect cooling towers and control Legionella with reduced chemical consumption and water bleed-off, and increased performance
- Sanitise swimming pools and spas
- Kill insects in stored grain
- Scrub yeast and mould spores from the air in food processing plants
- Wash fresh fruits and vegetables to kill yeast, mould, and bacteria
- Chemically attack contaminants in water: (iron, arsenic, hydrogen sulfide, nitrites, and complex organics lumped together as "colour")
- Provide an aid to flocculation (agglomeration of molecules, which aids in filtration, where the iron and arsenic are removed)
- Manufacture chemical compounds via chemical synthesis
- Clean and bleach fabrics (the former use is utilised in fabric restoration; the latter use is patented)
- Act as an antichlor in chlorine-based bleaching
- Assist in processing plastics to allow adhesion of inks
- Age rubber samples to determine the useful life of a batch of rubber
- Eradicate water-borne parasites such as Giardia lamblia and Cryptosporidium in surface water treatment plants.

Ozone is a reagent in many organic reactions in the laboratory and in industry. Ozonolysis is the cleavage of an alkene to carbonyl compounds.

Many hospitals around the world use large ozone generators to decontaminate operating rooms between surgeries. The rooms are cleaned and then sealed airtight before being filled with ozone which effectively kills or neutralizes all remaining bacteria.

Ozone is used as an alternative to chlorine or chlorine dioxide in the bleaching of wood pulp. It is often used in conjunction with oxygen and hydrogen peroxide to eliminate the need for chlorine-containing compounds in the manufacture of high-quality, white paper.

Ozone can be used to detoxify cyanide wastes (for example from gold and silver mining) by oxidising cyanide to cyanate and eventually to carbon dioxide.

=== Water disinfection ===
Since the invention of dielectric barrier discharge (DBD) plasma reactors, it has been employed for water treatment with ozone. However, with cheaper alternative disinfectants like chlorine, such applications of DBD ozone water decontamination have been limited by high power consumption and bulky equipment. Despite this, with research revealing the negative impacts of common disinfectants like chlorine with respect to toxic residuals and ineffectiveness in killing certain micro-organisms, DBD plasma-based ozone decontamination is of interest in current available technologies. Although ozonation of water with a high concentration of bromide does lead to the formation of undesirable brominated disinfection byproducts, unless drinking water is produced by desalination, ozonation can generally be applied without concern for these byproducts. Advantages of ozone include high thermodynamic oxidation potential, less sensitivity to organic material and better tolerance for pH variations while retaining the ability to kill bacteria, fungi, viruses, as well as spores and cysts. Although, ozone has been widely accepted in Europe for decades, it is sparingly used for decontamination in the U.S. due to limitations of high-power consumption, bulky installation and stigma attached with ozone toxicity. Considering this, recent research efforts have been directed toward the study of effective ozone water treatment systems. Researchers have looked into lightweight and compact low power surface DBD reactors, energy efficient volume DBD reactors and low power micro-scale DBD reactors. Such studies can help pave the path to re-acceptance of DBD plasma-based ozone decontamination of water, especially in the U.S.

=== Consumers ===
Ozone levels which are safe for people are ineffective at killing fungi and bacteria. Some consumer disinfection and cosmetic products emit ozone at levels harmful to human health.

Devices generating high levels of ozone, some of which use ionisation, are used to sanitise and deodorise uninhabited buildings, rooms, ductwork, woodsheds, boats, and other vehicles.

Ozonated water is used to launder clothes and to sanitise food, drinking water, and surfaces in the home. According to the U.S. Food and Drug Administration (FDA), it is "amending the food additive regulations to provide for the safe use of ozone in gaseous and aqueous phases as an antimicrobial agent on food, including meat and poultry." Studies at California Polytechnic University demonstrated that 0.3 μmol/mol levels of ozone dissolved in filtered tapwater can produce a reduction of more than 99.99% in such food-borne microorganisms as salmonella, E. coli 0157:H7 and Campylobacter. This quantity is 20,000 times the WHO-recommended limits stated above.

Ozone can be used to remove pesticide residues from fruits and vegetables.

Ozone is used in homes and hot tubs to kill bacteria in the water and to reduce the amount of chlorine or bromine required by reactivating them to their free state. Since ozone does not remain in the water long enough, ozone by itself is ineffective at preventing cross-contamination among bathers and must be used in conjunction with halogens. Gaseous ozone created by ultraviolet light or by corona discharge is injected into the water.

Ozone is also widely used in the treatment of water in aquariums and fishponds. Its use can minimise bacterial growth, control parasites, eliminate transmission of some diseases, and reduce or eliminate "yellowing" of the water. Ozone must not come in contact with fishes' gill structures. Natural saltwater (with life forms) provides enough "instantaneous demand" that controlled amounts of ozone activate bromide ions to hypobromous acid, and the ozone entirely decays in a few seconds to minutes. If oxygen-fed ozone is used, the water will be higher in dissolved oxygen and fishes' gill structures will atrophy, making them dependent on oxygen-enriched water.

=== Aquaculture ===
Ozonation – a process of infusing water with ozone – can be used in aquaculture to facilitate organic breakdown. Ozone is also added to recirculating systems to reduce nitrite levels through conversion into nitrate. If nitrite levels in the water are high, nitrites will also accumulate in the blood and tissues of fish, where it interferes with oxygen transport (it causes oxidation of the heme-group of haemoglobin from ferrous (Fe^{2+}) to ferric (Fe^{3+}), making haemoglobin unable to bind O_{2}). Despite these apparent positive effects, ozone use in recirculation systems has been linked to reducing the level of bioavailable iodine in salt water systems, resulting in iodine deficiency symptoms such as goitre and decreased growth in Senegalese sole (Solea senegalensis) larvae.

Ozonate seawater is used for surface disinfection of haddock and Atlantic halibut eggs against nodavirus. Nodavirus is a lethal and vertically transmitted virus which causes severe mortality in fish. Haddock eggs should not be treated with high ozone level as eggs so treated did not hatch and died after 3–4 days.

=== Agriculture ===
Ozone application on freshly cut pineapple and banana shows increase in flavonoids and total phenol contents when exposure is up to 20 minutes. Decrease in ascorbic acid (one form of vitamin C) content is observed but the positive effect on total phenol content and flavonoids can overcome the negative effect. Tomatoes upon treatment with ozone show an increase in β-carotene, lutein and lycopene. However, ozone application on strawberries in pre-harvest period shows decrease in ascorbic acid content.

Ozone facilitates the extraction of some heavy metals from soil using EDTA. EDTA forms strong, water-soluble coordination compounds with some heavy metals (Pb and Zn) thereby making it possible to dissolve them out from contaminated soil. If contaminated soil is pre-treated with ozone, the extraction efficacy of Pb, Am, and Pu increases by 11.0–28.9%, 43.5% and 50.7% respectively.

=== Effect on pollinators ===
Crop pollination is an essential part of an ecosystem. Ozone can have detrimental effects on plant-pollinator interactions. Pollinators carry pollen from one plant to another. This is an essential cycle inside of an ecosystem. Causing changes in certain atmospheric conditions around pollination sites or with xenobiotics could cause unknown changes to the natural cycles of pollinators and flowering plants. In a study conducted in North-Western Europe, crop pollinators were negatively affected more when ozone levels were higher.

=== Alternative medicine ===
The use of ozone for the treatment of medical conditions is not supported by high quality evidence, and is generally considered alternative medicine.

== See also ==
- Chappuis absorption
- Cyclic ozone
- Global Ozone Monitoring by Occultation of Stars (GOMOS)
- International Day for the Preservation of the Ozone Layer (September 16)
- Lightning
- Nitrogen oxides
- Ozone depletion, including the phenomenon known as the ozone hole.
- Ozone monitor
- Ozone monitoring instrument
- Ozone therapy
- Ozoneweb
- Ozonide (ion)
- Ozonolysis
- Polymer degradation
- Sterilization (microbiology)
