= Atheronals =

- Atheronal A

- Atheronal B

Names
- IUPAC names A: 3β-Hydroxy-5-oxo-5,6-secocholestan-6-al; B: 3β-Hydroxy-5β-hydroxy-B-norcholestane-6β-carboxaldehyde

Identifiers
CAS Number	A: 81811-27-0; B: 374563-86-7
3D model (JSmol)	A: Interactive image; B: Interactive image
PubChem CID	A: 6398884; B: 24779591
- InChI: A: InChI=1S/C27H46O3/c1-18(2)7-6-8-19(3)22-9-10-23-21(13-16-28)24(12-15-26(22,23)4)27(5)14-11-20(29)17-25(27)30/h16,18-24,29H,6-15,17H2,1-5H3/t19-,20+,21+,22-,23+,24+,26-,27-/m1/s1 Key: YAKOGNWFSAFQBB-MCFZVKJISA-N; B: InChI=1S/C27H46O3/c1-17(2)7-6-8-18(3)20-9-10-21-24-22(12-13-25(20,21)4)26(5)14-11-19(29)15-27(26,30)23(24)16-28/h16-24,29-30H,6-15H2,1-5H3/t18-,19+,20-,21?,22?,23-,24?,25-,26-,27-/m1/s1 Key: XILGKUFKDWNZBF-PWNNJZATSA-N
- SMILES: A: C[C@H](CCCC(C)C)[C@H]1CC[C@@H]2[C@@]1(CC[C@@H]([C@H]2CC=O)[C@]3(CC[C@@H](CC3=O)O)C)C; B: C[C@H](CCCC(C)C)[C@H]1CCC2[C@@]1(CCC3C2[C@H]([C@]4([C@@]3(CC[C@@H](C4)O)C)O)C=O)C

Properties
Chemical formula	C_{27}H_{46}O_{3}
Molar mass	418.662 g·mol^{−1}
- Except where otherwise noted, data are given for materials in their standard state (at 25 °C [77 °F], 100 kPa). Infobox references

Atheronals are biologically relevant oxysterols formed in the reaction of cholesterol with ozone. Atheronal A (secosterol A) is the major product of ozonolysis which is 3β-hydroxy-5-oxo-5,6-secocholestan-6-al. Atheronal B (secosterol B) is formed by the intramolecular aldol reaction of atheronal A, which is 3β-hydroxy-5β-hydroxy-B-norcholestane-6β-carboxaldehyde.

== Ozonolysis of cholesterol ==
Cholesterol, a alkene that are located in aspiratory surfactant, anticipated in the attack by ozone among the different reactive oxygen species (ROS, for example, singlet oxygen, superoxide anion, hydroxyl radicals, and ozone). Atheronals, the major product of ozonolysis, when cholesterol is ozonized in the arrangement at high ozone fixations (>0.1%), are the substance that need be give extra care to since it have huge effect on the human body.

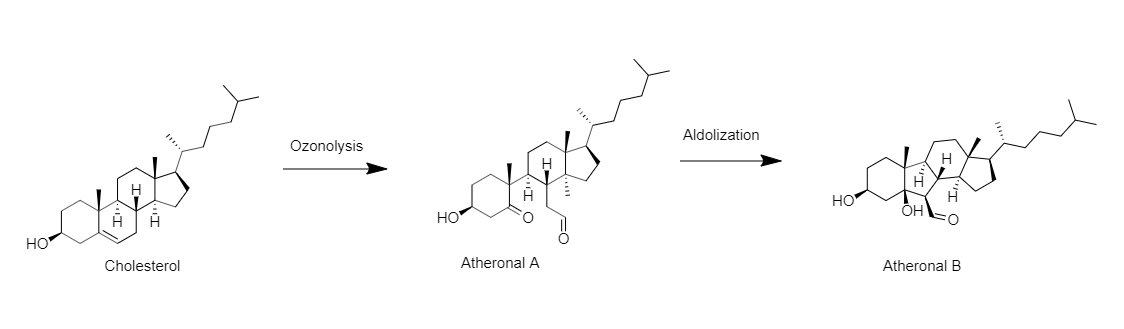
Mechanism of the ozonolysis of cholesterol

In the mechanism, atheronal A are produces from a process called ozonolysis. Next, the atheronal A go through aldol reaction that occur so smoothly in the biological system to produce atheronal B. Atheronal A and B were produced in an ozone-autonomous way using the Hock-cleavage of 5α-hydroperoxy cholesterol, which can emerge from the singlet oxygen ene reaction with cholesterol. However, atheronal B is shaped effectively under acidic conditions in natural solvents, yet atheronal A is either not framed at all or is a minor part in the aqueous buffer. Practically the measures of both of the atheronals are equivalent were shaped by the response of cholesterol with human myeloperoxidase (MPO) within sight of its substrates hydrogen peroxide (H_{2}O_{2}) and Cl^{−}. There is five times more atheronal B that was created compare to atheronal A when cholesterol was incubated with hypochlorous corrosive (HOCl) and hydrogen peroxide. In any cases, in both the responses, immunoglobulin G (IgG) did not improve the arrangement of secosterols, recommending that singlet oxygen (^{1}O_{2}) and perhaps another oxidant, however not an ozone-like oxidant, intervened the development of secosterols.

== Effects of atheronals in human body ==
When the ozonolysis of cholesterol reaction occurs, the atheronals as a product will quicken the normal conversion of monocytes to macrophages, are rapidly taken up by macrophages, hasten the inflammatory response on and increase the stickiness of the interior arterial walls, and contribute to the formation of arterial plaques. This cause atherosclerosis, the hardening of the arteries. Atheronals possess biological effects that if translated to an in vivo setting could lead to the recruitment, entrapment, dysfunction, and ultimate destruction of macrophages, with the major leukocyte player in inflammatory artery disease. Furthermore, atheronals have additionally been detected in lung tissue, potentially from exposure of lung surfactant to the troposphere. Furthermore, such cholesterol oxidation items have been found in the brains of autopsy specimens from Alzheimer’s disease patients. The ozonolyzed cholesterol quickens amyloidogenesis in these patients. They may play a crucial job in the pathogenesis of atherosclerosis and neurodegenerative infections.
