= Ozoneweb =

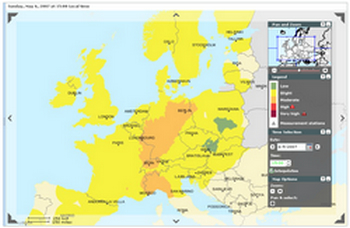
- Ozoneweb interpolated map May 2007
- Website type: International Government
- Owner: European Environment Agency
- Creators: EEA, Atkins Danmark
- Website: www.eea.europa.eu/maps/ozone/welcome
- Launched: July 2006
- Current status: Active

Ozoneweb is an EEA website on near real-time ozone. The website allows the general public to track air quality in a specific region and on a European level. The website displays ozone levels via a map of Europe. Background information on ozone and its health impacts are also provided. Users can monitor ozone levels in a neighbouring country or a holiday destination, check recent trends and track the spread of ozone across Europe. The website now includes a module to display exceedances in countries.

== Features of the site ==
Key features of the site are:

- Live status data on ozone
- Most measurement stations in Europe (over 700)
- Advanced Internet mapping tool
- Interpolated maps
- Comparisons views
- Support factual text

== About the data ==
Data from more than 700 air quality measurement stations across Europe are transmitted to the EEA in Copenhagen on an hourly basis. Since the data must be as 'real-time' as possible, the data are displayed as soon as practical after the end of each hour.

In the map, the ozone level is illustrated by colours. The colour scheme is linked to threshold values in EU legislation. To provide an estimate of the ozone status in areas between measurement stations, a statistical calculation (interpolation) is carried out on the ozone data received by the EEA. Before the result of the calculation is shown on the map, a number of conditions have to be satisfied by the input data and the resulting calculation.

URLs to data providers’ websites are available to users looking for more detailed localised information.

== The ozone directive ==
The directive on 'ozone in ambient air' came into force in 2002. The long-term objective is to limit the number of days with average ozone concentrations above 120 μg/m^{3} to less than 25 days a year (see table below). The objectives of the directive are in line with the World Health Organization's guidelines for ozone. The directive requires national authorities to inform the public – hourly or daily – about any incidence of ozone pollution above 180 μg/m^{3} (information threshold). Also, Member States should report monthly to the European Commission on all exceedances of the information and alert thresholds (see table below). Each year they must provide additional information on ozone pollution, especially concerning exceedances of the long-term objective.

| Objective | Value | Measured | Target/action |
|---|---|---|---|
| Information threshold | 180 μg/m^{3} | Hourly average | National authorities should inform the public and give advice immediately after an exceedance. Countries should report monthly on all exceedances |
| Alert threshold | 240 μg/m^{3} | Hourly average | National authorities should inform the public and give advice immediately after an exceedance. Countries should report monthly on all exceedances |
| Protect human health | 120 μg/m^{3} | 8 hour average | Not to be exceeded on more than 25 days per year (to be met by 2010). |

μg/m^{3}: The concentration of an air pollutant (e.g. ozone) is given in micrograms (one-millionth of a gram) per cubic meter air or μg/m^{3}.

== Ozone and health ==
Ozone at high concentrations is a health hazard because it can irritate airways, cause breathing difficulties and damage lungs. It can cause lung inflammation (irritation) even after only a few hours of exposure. Ozone exposure has been linked to a number of health effects and is thought to be the cause of the premature deaths of thousands of people in Europe each year. Some people are more vulnerable than others. Children and people with asthma or other respiratory illnesses are particularly high-risk groups.

== Ozone and environmental impacts ==
Ground-level ozone can damage all types of green vegetation, including the foliage of trees. Ozone is absorbed by leaves and impedes plant growth. Ozone is recognised as the most serious regional air pollution problem for the agricultural sector in Europe. It reduces crop yields by hindering plant growth. In 2000, it was estimated that the overall ozone damage to crops corresponded to an economic loss to farmers across EU-25 of about EUR 2.8 billion. There are marked differences in damage to crops across Europe, depending on agricultural activity, soil moisture and ozone concentration. Most affected by elevated ozone concentrations are countries that are growing wheat. The economic or ecological cost of ozone damage to wild vegetation has not been estimated.

== See also ==
- Ozone
- Tropospheric ozone
