= Cyclic ozone =

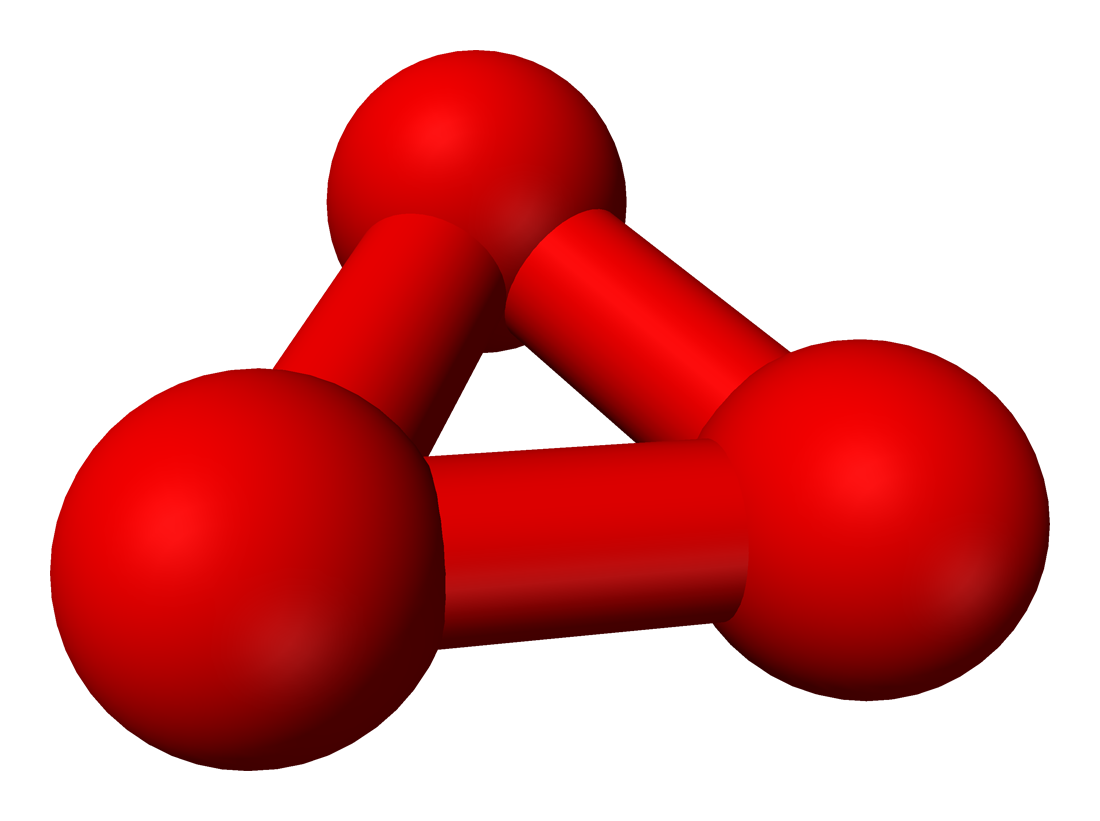

Names
- Systematic IUPAC name Trioxirane
- Other names: Cyclotrioxidane; Trioxacyclopropane

Identifiers
CAS Number	153851-84-4
3D model (JSmol)	Interactive image
ChemSpider	13375217
PubChem CID	16206854
CompTox Dashboard (EPA)	DTXSID00583328
- InChI: InChI=1S/O3/c1-2-3-1 Key: XQOAKYYZMDCSIA-UHFFFAOYSA-N
- SMILES: O1OO1

Properties
Chemical formula	O_{3}
Molar mass	47.997 g·mol^{−1}
- Except where otherwise noted, data are given for materials in their standard state (at 25 °C [77 °F], 100 kPa). verify (what is ?) Infobox references

Cyclic ozone is a theoretically predicted form of ozone. Like ordinary ozone (O=O^{+}−O^{−}), it would have three oxygen atoms. It would differ from ordinary ozone in how those three oxygen atoms are arranged. In ordinary ozone, the atoms are arranged in a bent line; in cyclic ozone, they would form an equilateral triangle.

Some of the properties of cyclic ozone have been predicted theoretically. It should have more energy than ordinary ozone.

There is evidence that tiny quantities of cyclic ozone exist at the surface of magnesium oxide crystals in air. Cyclic ozone has not been made in bulk, although at least one researcher has attempted to do so using lasers. Another possibility to stabilize this form of oxygen is to produce it inside confined spaces, e.g., fullerene.

It has been speculated that, if cyclic ozone could be made in bulk, and if it proved to have good stability properties, it could be added to liquid oxygen to improve the specific impulse of rocket fuel.

Currently, the possibility of cyclic ozone is confirmed within diverse theoretical approaches.
