= Sulfur oxygenase =

Sulfur oxygenase may refer to:

- Sulfur dioxygenase, an enzyme
- Sulfur oxygenase/reductase, an enzyme
