= Sulfur =

Sulfur, _{16}S
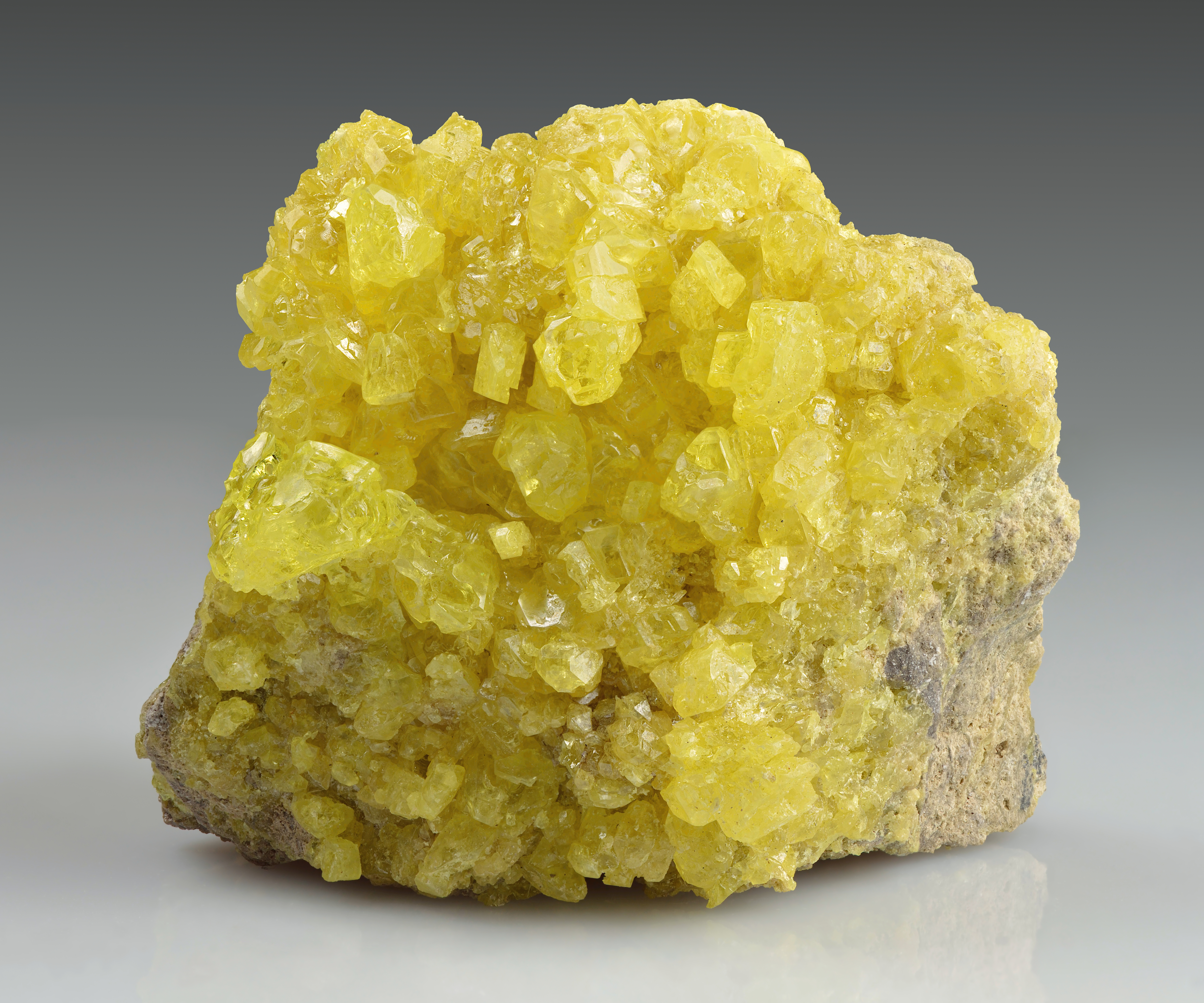

Sulfur
- Alternative name: Sulphur (pre-1992 British spelling)
- Allotropes: see Allotropes of sulfur
- Appearance: Lemon yellow sintered microcrystals

Standard atomic weight A_{r}°(S)
- [32.059, 32.076]; 32.06±0.02 (abridged)

Sulfur in the periodic table
Hydrogen																															Helium
Lithium	Beryllium																									Boron	Carbon	Nitrogen	Oxygen	Fluorine	Neon
Sodium	Magnesium																									Aluminium	Silicon	Phosphorus	Sulfur	Chlorine	Argon
Potassium	Calcium															Scandium	Titanium	Vanadium	Chromium	Manganese	Iron	Cobalt	Nickel	Copper	Zinc	Gallium	Germanium	Arsenic	Selenium	Bromine	Krypton
Rubidium	Strontium															Yttrium	Zirconium	Niobium	Molybdenum	Technetium	Ruthenium	Rhodium	Palladium	Silver	Cadmium	Indium	Tin	Antimony	Tellurium	Iodine	Xenon
Caesium	Barium	Lanthanum	Cerium	Praseodymium	Neodymium	Promethium	Samarium	Europium	Gadolinium	Terbium	Dysprosium	Holmium	Erbium	Thulium	Ytterbium	Lutetium	Hafnium	Tantalum	Tungsten	Rhenium	Osmium	Iridium	Platinum	Gold	Mercury (element)	Thallium	Lead	Bismuth	Polonium	Astatine	Radon
Francium	Radium	Actinium	Thorium	Protactinium	Uranium	Neptunium	Plutonium	Americium	Curium	Berkelium	Californium	Einsteinium	Fermium	Mendelevium	Nobelium	Lawrencium	Rutherfordium	Dubnium	Seaborgium	Bohrium	Hassium	Meitnerium	Darmstadtium	Roentgenium	Copernicium	Nihonium	Flerovium	Moscovium	Livermorium	Tennessine	Oganesson
O
↑
S
↓
Se
phosphorus ← sulfur → chlorine
- Atomic number (Z): 16
- Group: group 16 (chalcogens)
- Period: period 3
- Block: p-block
- Electron configuration: [Ne] 3s^{2} 3p^{4}
- Electrons per shell: 2, 8, 6

Physical properties
- Phase at STP: solid
- Melting point: alpha (α-S_{8}): 388.36 K (115.21 °C, 239.38 °F)
- Boiling point: 717.8 K (444.6 °C, 832.3 °F)
- Density (near r.t.): alpha (α-S_{8}): 2.07 g/cm^{3} beta (β-S_{8}): 1.96 g/cm^{3} gamma (γ-S_{8}): 1.92 g/cm^{3}
- when liquid (at m.p.): 1.819 g/cm^{3}
- Critical point: 1314 K, 20.7 MPa
- Heat of fusion: beta (β-S_{8}): 1.727 kJ/mol
- Heat of vaporization: beta (β-S_{8}): 45 kJ/mol
- Molar heat capacity: 22.75 J/(mol·K)
- Specific heat capacity: 709.607 J/(kg·K)
Vapor pressure
P (Pa)	1	10	100	1 k	10 k	100 k
at T (K)	375	408	449	508	591	717

Atomic properties
- Oxidation states: common: −2, +2, +4, +6 −1, 0, +1, +3, +5
- Electronegativity: Pauling scale: 2.58
- Ionization energies: 1st: 999.6 kJ/mol; 2nd: 2252 kJ/mol; 3rd: 3357 kJ/mol; (more)
- Covalent radius: 105±3 pm
- Van der Waals radius: 180 pm
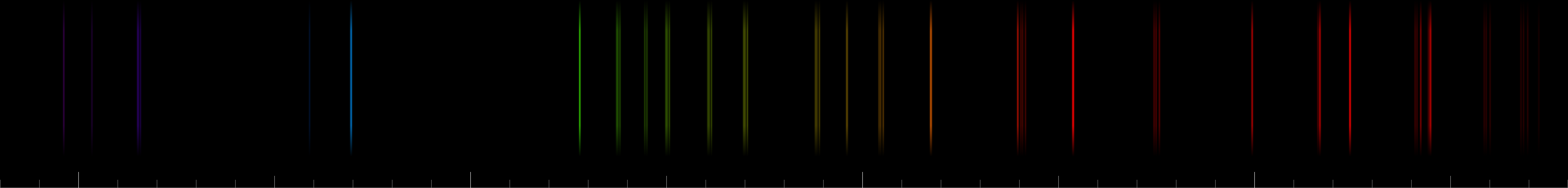
- Spectral lines of sulfur

Other properties
- Natural occurrence: primordial
- Crystal structure: alpha (α-S_{8}): orthorhombic (oF128)
- Lattice constants: a = 1.0460 nm b = 1.2861 nm c = 2.4481 nm (at 20 °C)
- Crystal structure: beta (β-S_{8}): monoclinic (mP48)
- Lattice constants: a = 1.0923 nm b = 1.0851 nm c = 1.0787 nm β = 95.905° (at 20 °C)
- Thermal conductivity: 0.205 W/(m⋅K) (amorphous)
- Electrical resistivity: 2×10^{15} Ω⋅m (at 20 °C) (amorphous)
- Magnetic ordering: diamagnetic
- Molar magnetic susceptibility: alpha (α-S_{8}): −15.5×10^{−6} cm^{3}/mol (298 K)
- Bulk modulus: 7.7 GPa
- Mohs hardness: 2.0
- CAS Number: 7704-34-9

History
- Naming: from the Latin sulpur
- Discovery: before 2000 BCE
- Recognized as an element by: Antoine Lavoisier (1777)

Isotopes of sulfur
Main isotopes			Decay	
Isotope	abundance	half-life (t_{1/2})	mode	product
^{32}S	94.85%	stable		
^{33}S	0.76%	stable		
^{34}S	4.37%	stable		
^{35}S	(unstable)	87.37 d	β^{−}	^{35}Cl
^{36}S	0.02%	stable		
^{34}S abundances vary greatly (between 3.96 and 4.77 percent) in natural samples.

Sulfur, also spelled as sulphur, is a chemical element; it has symbol S and atomic number 16. It is abundant, multivalent and nonmetallic. Under normal conditions, sulfur atoms form cyclic octatomic molecules with the chemical formula S_{8}. Elemental sulfur is a bright yellow, crystalline solid at room temperature.

Sulfur is the tenth most abundant element by mass in the universe and the fifth most common on Earth. Though sometimes found in pure, native form, sulfur on Earth usually occurs as sulfide and sulfate minerals. Being abundant in native form, sulfur was known in ancient times, being mentioned for its uses in ancient India, ancient Greece, China, and ancient Egypt. Historically and in literature sulfur is also called brimstone, which means "burning stone". Almost all elemental sulfur is produced as a byproduct of removing sulfur-containing contaminants from natural gas and petroleum. The greatest commercial use of the element is the production of sulfuric acid for sulfate and phosphate fertilizers, and other chemical processes. Sulfur is used in matches, insecticides, and fungicides. Many sulfur compounds are odoriferous, and the smells of odorized natural gas, skunk scent, bad breath, grapefruit, and garlic are due to organosulfur compounds. Hydrogen sulfide gives the characteristic odor to rotting eggs and other biological processes.

Sulfur is an essential element for all life, almost always in the form of organosulfur compounds or metal sulfides. Amino acids (two proteinogenic: cysteine and methionine, and many other non-coded: cystine, taurine, etc.) and two vitamins (biotin and thiamine) are organosulfur compounds crucial for life. Many cofactors also contain sulfur, including glutathione, and iron–sulfur proteins. Disulfides, S–S bonds, confer mechanical strength and insolubility of the (among others) protein keratin, found in outer skin, hair, and feathers. Sulfur is one of the core chemical elements needed for biochemical functioning and is an elemental macronutrient for all living organisms.

== Characteristics ==
=== Physical properties ===
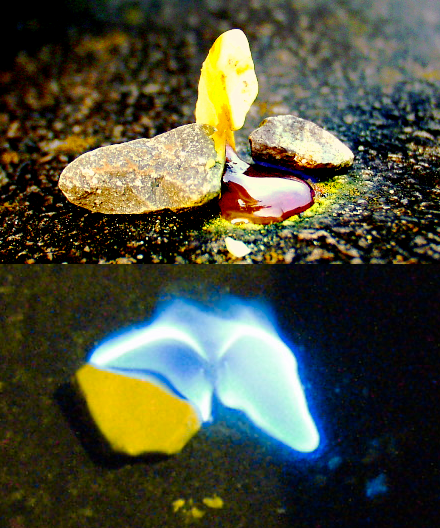
As a solid, sulfur is a characteristic lemon yellow; when burned, sulfur melts into a blood-red liquid and burns with a blue flame.

Sulfur forms several polyatomic molecules. The best-known allotrope is octasulfur, cyclo-S_{8}. The point group of cyclo-S_{8} is D_{4d} and its dipole moment is 0 D. Octasulfur is a soft, bright-yellow solid that is odorless. (Note: But impure samples have an odor similar to that of matches. A strong odor called "smell of sulfur" actually is given off by several sulfur compounds, such as hydrogen sulfide and organosulfur compounds.) It melts at 115.21 °C (239.38 °F), (Note: Sulfur's melting point at 115.21°C was determined by two laboratories of the US Department of Energy (Jefferson Lab and Los Alamos National Lab). Greenwood and Earnshaw say that at fast heating for microcrystalline α-S_{8} the melting point is 115.1 °C (239.2 °F).) and boils at 444.6 °C (832.3 °F). At 95.2 °C (203.4 °F), below its melting temperature, cyclo-octasulfur begins slowly changing from α-octasulfur to the β-polymorph. The structure of the S_{8} ring is virtually unchanged by this phase transition, which affects the intermolecular interactions. Cooling molten sulfur freezes at 119.6 °C (247.3 °F), as it predominantly consists of the β-S_{8} molecules. (Note: Historically, it was rather difficult to find the exact melting point of sulfur. When heated slowly, the melting point may range from 114.6 °C (238.3 °F) to 120.4 °C (248.7 °F) (factors that interfere with a definite melting point, are the polymerlike nature of sulfur and a large number of allotropes.) Melting point may be presented as a temperature range, depending on the allotropic composition of a sample at the time of melting.) Between its melting and boiling temperatures, octasulfur changes its allotrope again, turning from β-octasulfur to γ-sulfur, again accompanied by a lower density but increased viscosity due to the formation of polymers. At higher temperatures, the viscosity decreases as depolymerization occurs. Molten sulfur assumes a dark red color above 200 °C (392 °F). The density of sulfur is about 2 g/cm^{3}, depending on the allotrope; all of the stable allotropes are excellent electrical insulators.

The sublimation of sulfur becomes noticeable more or less between 20 °C (68 °F) and 50 °C (122 °F), and occurs readily in boiling water at 100 °C (212 °F).

Sulfur is insoluble in water but soluble in carbon disulfide and, to a lesser extent, in other nonpolar organic solvents, such as benzene and toluene. Sulfur is also soluble in supercritical carbon dioxide.

=== Chemical properties ===
Under normal conditions, sulfur hydrolyzes very slowly to mainly form hydrogen sulfide and sulfuric acid:

S_{8} + 8 H_{2}O → 6 H_{2}S + 2 H_{2}SO_{4}
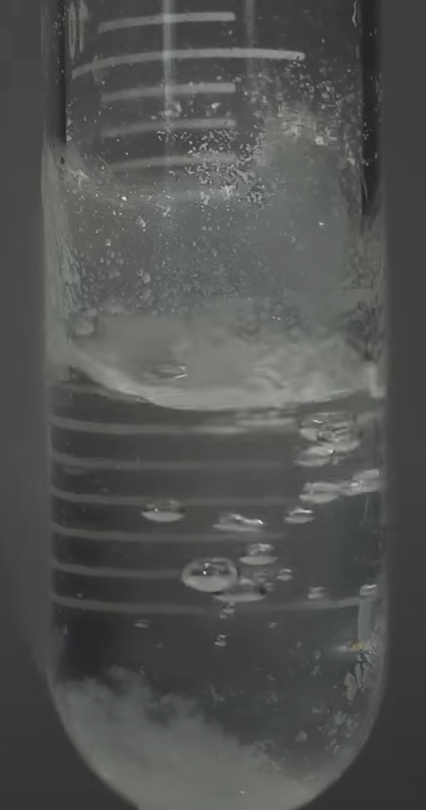
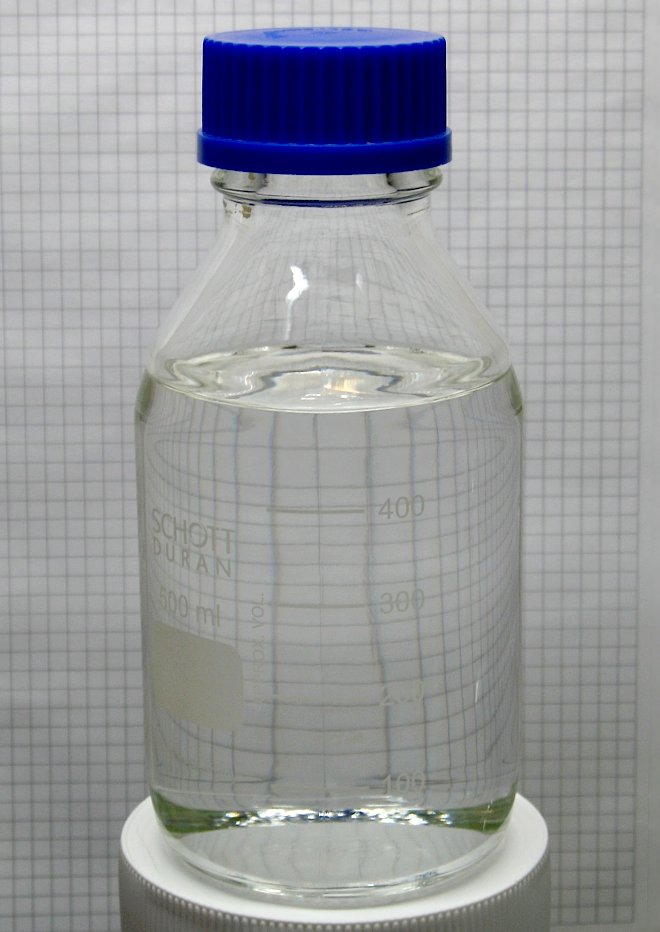
Top: Liquid hydrogen sulfide inside a test tube. Bottom: A bottle of sulfuric acid.

The reaction involves adsorption of protons onto S_{8} clusters, followed by disproportionation into the reaction products.

The second, fourth and sixth ionization energies of sulfur are 2252 kJ/mol, 4556 kJ/mol and 8495.8 kJ/mol, respectively. The composition of reaction products of sulfur with oxidants (and its oxidation state) depends on whether releasing of reaction energy overcomes these thresholds. Applying catalysts and/or supply of external energy may vary sulfur's oxidation state and the composition of reaction products. While reaction between sulfur and oxygen under normal conditions gives sulfur dioxide (oxidation state +4), formation of sulfur trioxide (oxidation state +6) requires a temperature of 400–600 °C (750–1,100 °F) and presence of a catalyst.

In reactions with elements of lesser electronegativity, it reacts as an oxidant and forms sulfides, where it has oxidation state −2.

Sulfur reacts with nearly all other elements except noble gases, even with the notoriously unreactive metal iridium (yielding iridium disulfide). Some of those reactions require elevated temperatures.

=== Allotropes ===
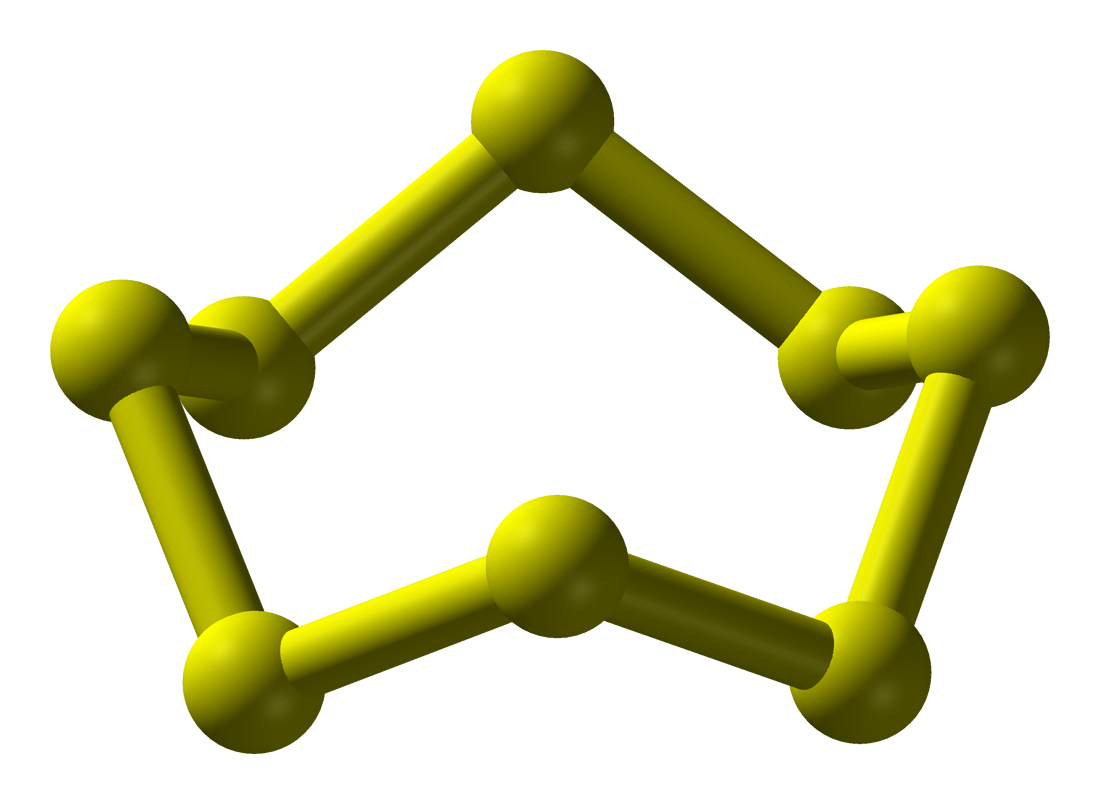
The structure of the cyclooctasulfur molecule, S_{8}

Sulfur forms over 30 solid molecular allotropes, more than any other element. Besides S_{8}, several other rings are known. Removing one atom from the crown gives S_{7}, which is of a deeper yellow than S_{8}. HPLC analysis of "elemental sulfur" reveals an equilibrium mixture of mainly S_{8}, but with S_{7} and small amounts of S_{6}. Larger rings have been prepared, including S_{12} and S_{18}.

Amorphous or "plastic" sulfur is produced by rapid cooling of molten sulfur—for example, by pouring it into cold water. X-ray crystallography studies show that the amorphous form may have a helical structure with eight atoms per turn. The long coiled polymeric molecules make the brownish substance elastic, and in bulk it has the feel of crude rubber. This form is metastable at room temperature and gradually reverts to the crystalline molecular allotrope, which is no longer elastic.

=== Isotopes ===
Sulfur has 23 known isotopes, four of which are stable: ^{32}S (94.99%±0.26%), ^{33}S (0.75%±0.02%), ^{34}S (4.25%±0.24%), and ^{36}S (0.01%±0.01%). Other than ^{35}S, with a half-life of 87.37 days, the radioactive isotopes of sulfur have half-lives less than 3 hours.

The preponderance of ^{32}S is explained by its production in the alpha process (one of the main classes of nuclear fusion reactions) in exploding stars. Other stable sulfur isotopes are produced in the bypass processes related with ^{34}Ar, and their composition depends on the type of a stellar explosion. For example, proportionally more ^{33}S comes from novae than from supernovae.

The proportion of the two most abundant sulfur isotopes ^{32}S and ^{34}S varies in different samples by a surprisingly large amount. Determination of the isotope ratio (δ^{34}S) in the samples indicates their chemical history, and with support of other methods, it allows to age-date the samples, estimate temperature of equilibrium between ore and water, determine pH and oxygen fugacity, identify the activity of sulfate-reducing bacteria in the time of formation of the sample, or suggest the main sources of sulfur in ecosystems. However, there are ongoing discussions over the real reason for the δ^{34}S shifts, biological activity or postdeposit alteration.

When sulfide minerals are precipitated, isotopic equilibration between solid and liquid may cause small differences in the δ^{34}S values of co-genetic minerals. The differences between minerals can be used to estimate the temperature of equilibration. The δ^{13}C and δ^{34}S of coexisting carbonate minerals and sulfides can be used to determine the pH and oxygen fugacity of the ore-bearing fluid during ore formation.

The radioactive ^{35}S is formed in cosmic ray spallation of the atmospheric ^{40}Ar. This fact may be used to verify the presence of recent (less than a year old) atmospheric sediments in various materials. This isotope may be obtained artificially in different ways. In practice, the reaction ^{35}Cl + n → ^{35}S + p is used, irradiating potassium chloride with neutrons. The isotope ^{35}S is used in various sulfur-containing compounds as a radioactive tracer for many biological studies, for example, the Hershey-Chase experiment.

Because of the weak beta activity of ^{35}S, its compounds are relatively safe as long as they are not ingested or absorbed by the body.

=== Natural occurrence ===
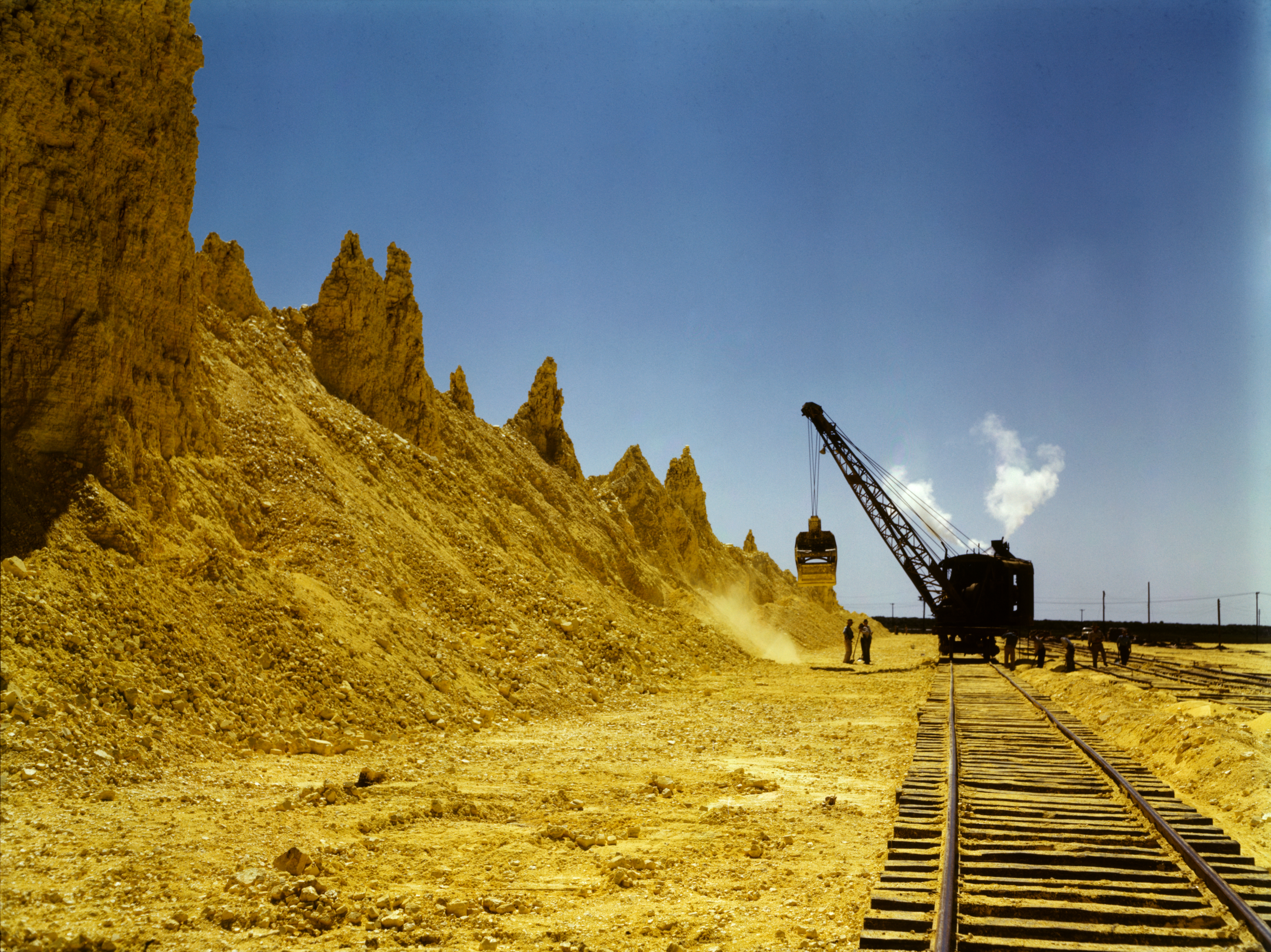
Sulfur vat from which railroad cars are loaded, Freeport Sulphur Co., Hoskins Mound, Texas (1943)

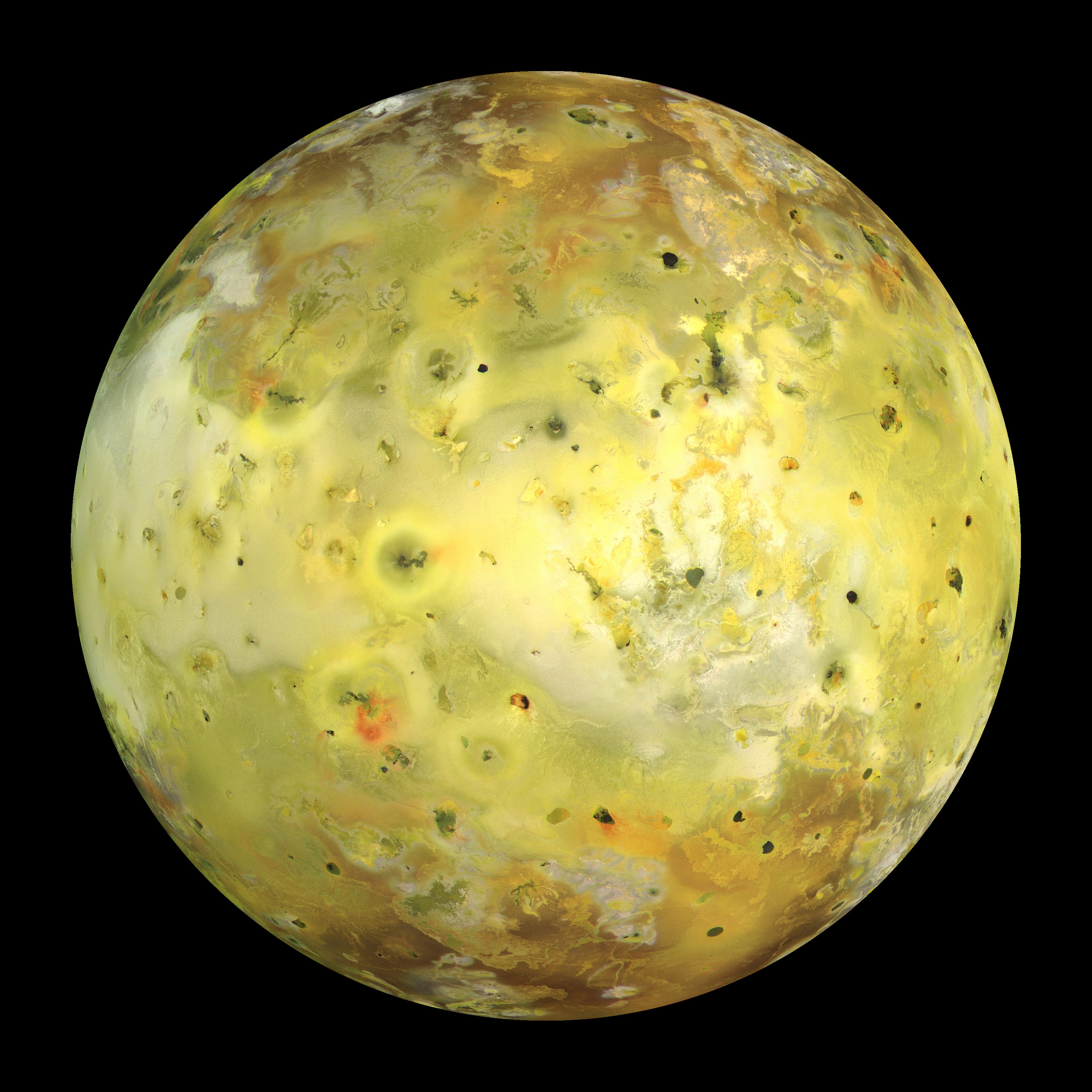
Most of the yellow and orange hues of Io are due to elemental sulfur and sulfur compounds deposited by active volcanoes.

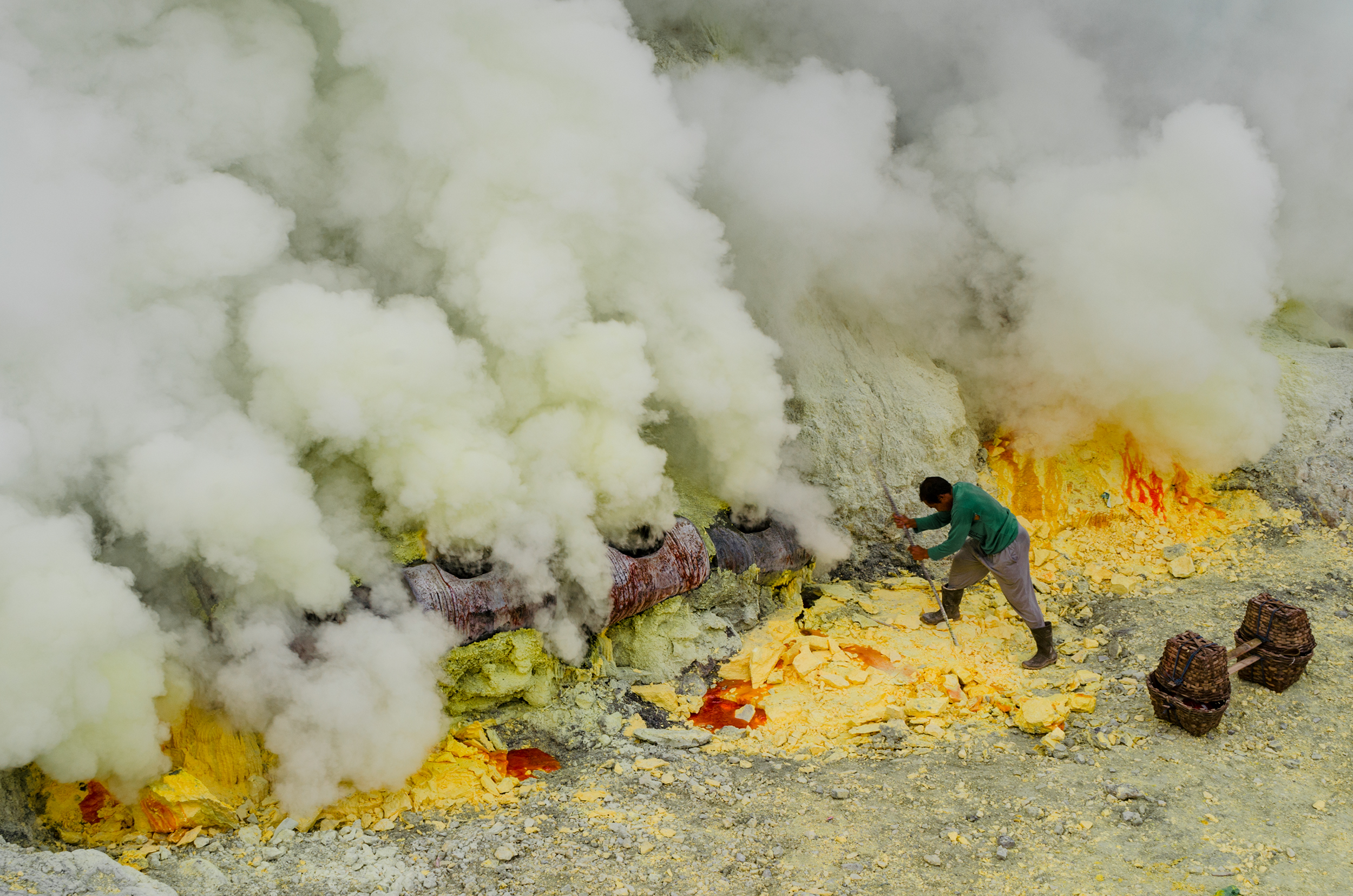
Sulfur extraction, East Java

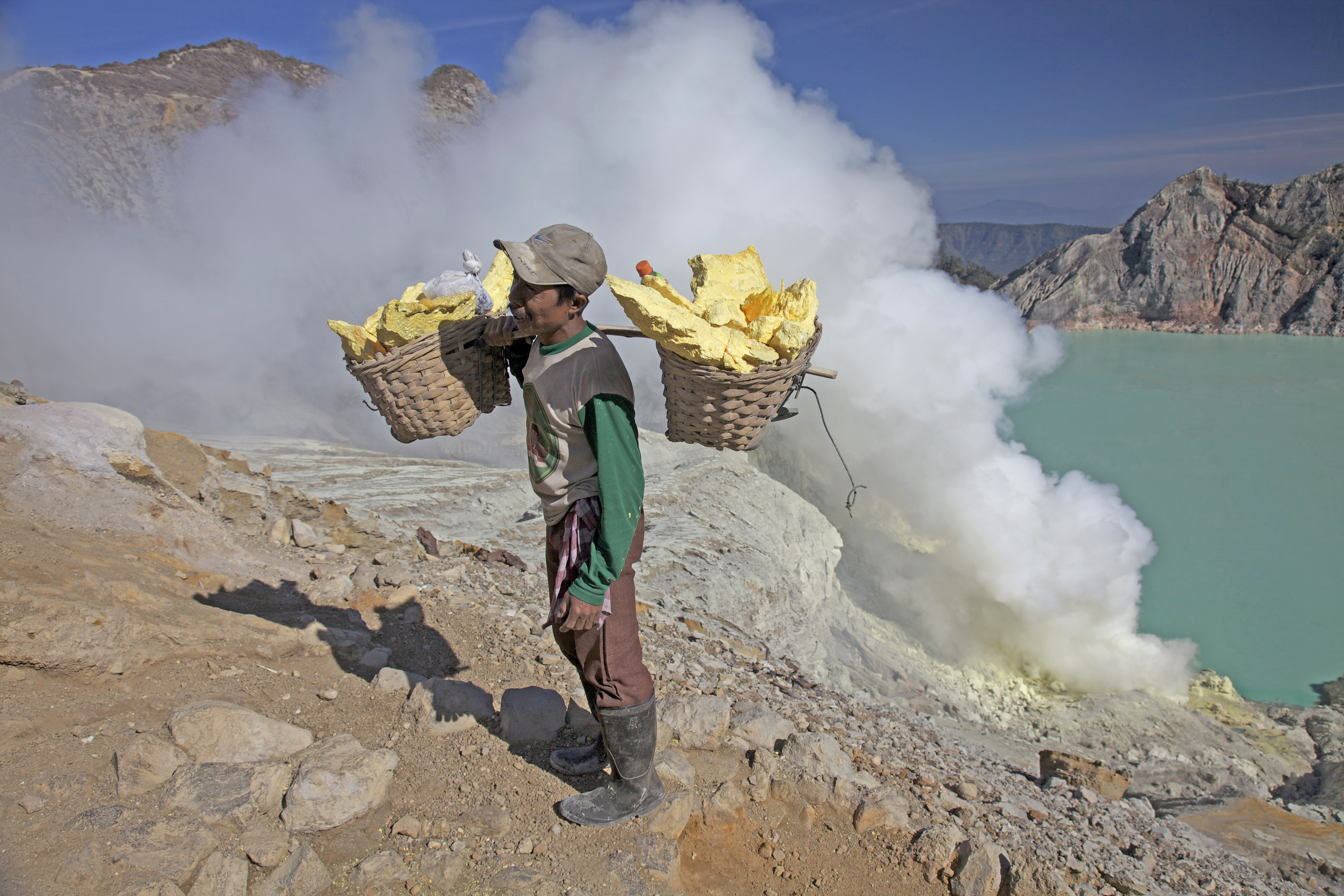
A man carrying sulfur blocks from Kawah Ijen, a volcano in East Java, Indonesia, 2009

^{32}S is produced by stellar nucleosynthesis inside massive stars, at a depth where the temperature exceeds 2.5×10^{9} kelvins (4.50×10^{9} °F), by the fusion of one nucleus of silicon plus one nucleus of helium. Because this nuclear reaction is part of the alpha process, which produces highly abundant elements, sulfur is the 10th most common element in the universe.

Sulfur is the fifth most common element by mass in the Earth. Petroleum and natural gas are the main industrial sources of sulfur.

==== Elemental S ====
Elemental sulfur can be found near hot springs and volcanic regions in many parts of the world, especially along the Pacific Ring of Fire; such volcanic deposits are mined in Indonesia, Chile, and Japan. These deposits are polycrystalline, with the largest documented single crystal measuring 22 cm × 16 cm × 11 cm (8.7 in × 6.3 in × 4.3 in). Historically, Sicily was a major source of sulfur in the Industrial Revolution. Lakes of molten sulfur up to about 200 m (660 ft) in diameter have been found on the sea floor, associated with submarine volcanoes, at depths where the boiling point of water is higher than the melting point of sulfur.

Native sulfur is produced by anaerobic bacteria acting on sulfate minerals such as gypsum in salt domes. Significant deposits in salt domes occur along the coast of the Gulf of Mexico, and in evaporites in eastern Europe and western Asia. Native sulfur may be produced by geological processes alone. Fossil-based sulfur deposits from salt domes were once the basis for commercial production in the United States, Russia, Turkmenistan, and Ukraine.

==== S-containing minerals ====
Sulfur, usually in the sulfide oxidation state, is present in many types of minerals including those in meteorites. Common naturally-occurring sulfur compounds include the sulfide minerals, such as pyrite (iron sulfide), cinnabar (mercury sulfide), galena (lead sulfide), sphalerite (zinc sulfide), and stibnite (antimony sulfide); and the sulfate minerals, such as gypsum (calcium sulfate), alunite (potassium aluminium sulfate), and barite (barium sulfate).

==== Extraterrestrial ====
The distinctive colors of Jupiter's volcanic moon Io are attributed to various forms of molten, solid, and gaseous sulfur. In July 2024, elemental sulfur was accidentally discovered to exist on Mars after the Curiosity rover drove over and crushed a rock, revealing sulfur crystals inside it.

== Compounds ==
Common oxidation states of sulfur range from −2 to +6. Sulfur forms stable compounds with all elements except the noble gases.

=== Catenation ===
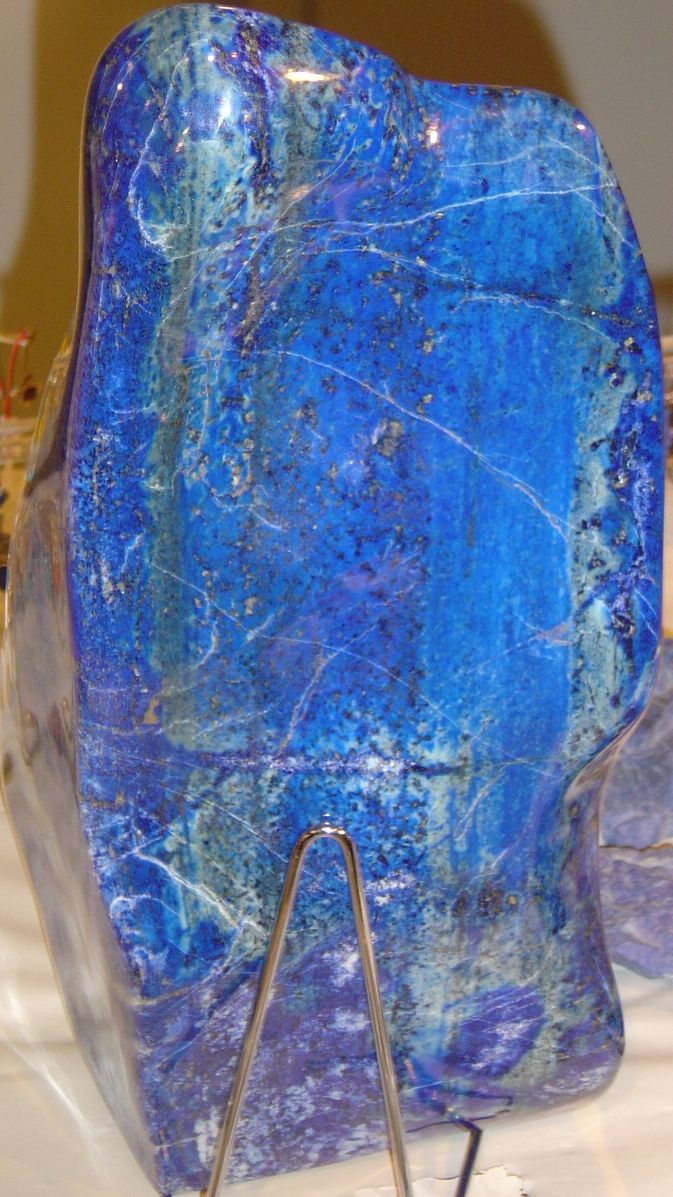
Lapis lazuli owes its blue color to a trisulfur radical anion (S^{−}_{3})

Sulfur often forms bonds to itself, resulting in rings and chains. Sulfur polycations, S^{2+}_{8}, S^{2+}_{4} and S^{2+}_{19} are produced when sulfur is treated with oxidizing agents in a strongly acidic solution. These species colored solutions produced by dissolving sulfur in oleum were first reported as early as 1804 by C. F. Bucholz, but the cause of the color and the structure of the polycations involved was only determined in the late 1960s. S^{2+}_{8} is deep blue, S^{2+}_{4} is yellow and S^{2+}_{19} is red.

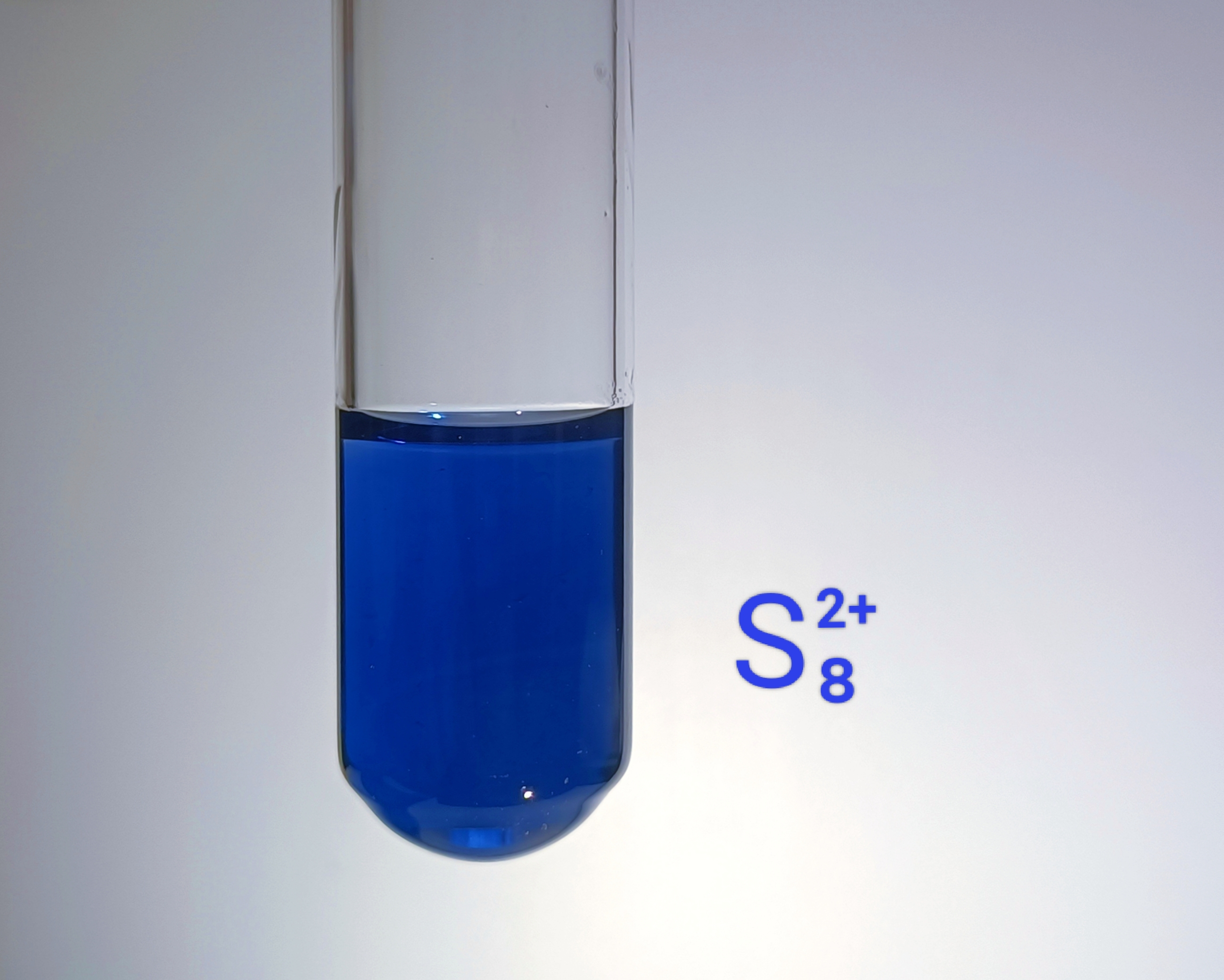
When sulfur is dissolved in oleum, a dark blue solution containing S_{8}^{2+} is obtained

Reduction of sulfur gives various polysulfides with the formula S^{2−}_{x}, many of which have been obtained in crystalline form. Illustrative is the production of sodium tetrasulfide:

4 Na + S_{8} → 2 Na_{2}S_{4}

Some of these dianions dissociate to give radical anions. For instance, S^{−}_{3} gives the blue color of the mineral lapis lazuli.

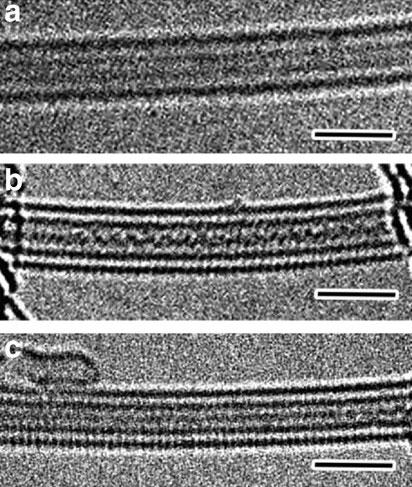
Two parallel sulfur chains grown inside a single-wall carbon nanotube (CNT, a). Zig-zag (b) and straight (c) S chains inside double-wall CNTs

This reaction highlights a distinctive property of sulfur: its ability to catenate (bind to itself by formation of chains). Protonation of these polysulfide anions produces the polysulfanes, H_{2}S_{x}, where x = 2, 3, and 4. Ultimately, reduction of sulfur produces sulfide salts:

16 Na + S_{8} → 8 Na_{2}S

The interconversion of these species is exploited in the sodium–sulfur battery.

=== Hydrogenation ===
Treatment of sulfur with hydrogen gives hydrogen sulfide, a colorless mildly acidic, toxic gas:

H_{2}S ⇌ HS^{−} + H^{+}

=== Combustion ===
The two principal sulfur oxides are obtained by burning sulfur:

S + O_{2} → SO_{2} (sulfur dioxide)
2 SO_{2} + O_{2} → 2 SO_{3} (sulfur trioxide)

Many other sulfur oxides are observed including the sulfur-rich oxides include sulfur monoxide, disulfur monoxide, disulfur dioxides, and higher oxides containing peroxo groups.

=== Halogenation ===
Sulfur reacts with fluorine to give the highly reactive sulfur tetrafluoride and the highly inert sulfur hexafluoride. Whereas fluorine gives S(IV) and S(VI) compounds, chlorine gives S(II) and S(I) derivatives. Thus, sulfur dichloride, disulfur dichloride, and higher chlorosulfanes arise from the chlorination of sulfur. Sulfuryl chloride and chlorosulfuric acid are derivatives of sulfuric acid; thionyl chloride (SOCl_{2}) is a common reagent in organic synthesis. Bromine also oxidizes sulfur to form sulfur dibromide and disulfur dibromide.

=== Pseudohalides ===
Sulfur oxidizes cyanide and sulfite to give thiocyanate and thiosulfate, respectively.

=== Metal sulfides ===
Sulfur reacts with many metals. Electropositive metals give polysulfide salts. Copper, zinc, and silver are attacked by sulfur; see tarnishing. Although many metal sulfides are known, most are prepared by high temperature reactions of the elements. Geoscientists also study the isotopes of metal sulfides in rocks and sediment to study environmental conditions in the Earth's past.

=== Organic compounds ===
Illustrative organosulfur compounds

(L)-Cysteine, an amino acid containing a thiol group

Thiamine or vitamin B_{1}

Biotin or vitamin B_{7}

Penicillin, an antibiotic ("R" is the variable group)

Allicin, a chemical compound in garlic

Diphenyl disulfide, a representative disulfide

Dibenzothiophene, a component of crude oil

Perfluorooctanesulfonic acid (PFOS), a surfactant

Some of the main classes of sulfur-containing organic compounds include the following:

- Thiols or mercaptans (so called because they capture mercury as chelators) are the sulfur analogs of alcohols; treatment of thiols with base gives thiolate ions.
- Thioethers are the sulfur analogs of ethers.
- Sulfonium ions have three groups attached to a cationic sulfur center. Dimethylsulfoniopropionate (DMSP) is one such compound, important in the marine organic sulfur cycle.
- Sulfoxides and sulfones are thioethers with one and two oxygen atoms attached to the sulfur atom, respectively. The simplest sulfoxide, dimethyl sulfoxide, is a common solvent; a common sulfone is sulfolane.
- Sulfonic acids are used in many detergents.

Compounds with carbon–sulfur multiple bonds are uncommon, an exception being carbon disulfide, a volatile colorless liquid that is structurally similar to carbon dioxide. It is used as a reagent to make the polymer rayon and many organosulfur compounds. Unlike carbon monoxide, carbon monosulfide is stable only as an extremely dilute gas, found between solar systems.

Organosulfur compounds are responsible for some of the unpleasant odors of decaying organic matter. They are widely known as the odorant in domestic natural gas, garlic odor, and skunk spray, as well as a component of bad breath odor. Not all organic sulfur compounds smell unpleasant at all concentrations: the sulfur-containing monoterpenoid grapefruit mercaptan in small concentrations is the characteristic scent of grapefruit, but has a generic thiol odor at larger concentrations. Sulfur mustard, a potent vesicant, was used in World War I as a disabling agent.

== History ==
=== Antiquity ===
According to the Ebers Papyrus, a sulfur ointment was used in ancient Egypt to treat granular eyelids. There are ancient Egyptian necklaces, dated between the Ptolemaic period and the early Roman period, with beads made of sulfur, shaped like flowers and cow heads.

Sulfur is one of the ingredients of niello, a dark material used to decorate metallic items. Pliny the Elder mentioned, in the first century AD, that the Romans used a type of niello inherited from the Egyptians, who, according to him, made a dark pigment to depict Anubis on silver vessels. He lists a recipe where copper and silver are mixed with sulfur and heated to produce this material.

In Roman jewelry, sulfur was used as a filler in hollow gold items, especially in gold rings. This practice was widespread enough to be included by Artemidorus in the section of the Oneirocritica about gold finger-rings, where he mentions rings "that are hollow and filled with brimstone". Modern analysis has confirmed this, detecting sulfur in ancient Roman gold artifacts.

In the 2nd century BC, Cato the Elder gave a recipe to protect vines against caterpillars, which contains sulfur as an ingredient, in his De Agri Cultura, an early example of its use as pest control.

Pliny the Elder further discussed sulfur in his Natural History, saying that its best-known source is the island of Melos. He listed four types of sulfur: one used for medicinal purposes, one used by fullers, one used to bleach wool and one used for lamp wicks. He noted its use in Ancient Rome in religious ceremonies to purify homes by fumigation (something also briefly evoked in a line of Ovid's Ars Amatoria about purifying houses with eggs and sulfur). The use of sulfur for fumigation is very ancient and was already a practice in preclassical Greece; this is mentioned in the Odyssey.

The Persian army used sulfur as a chemical weapon during the siege of Dura-Europos, in the 3rd century. They burned pitch and sulfur in tunnels, creating a toxic cloud of sulfur dioxide which killed the Roman soldiers in the tunnels.

A natural form of sulfur known as shiliuhuang (Chinese: 石硫黃; pinyin: shí liú huáng) was known in China since the 6th century BC and found in Hanzhong. By the 3rd century, the Chinese had discovered that sulfur could be extracted from pyrite. Chinese Daoists were interested in sulfur's flammability and its reactivity with certain metals, yet its earliest practical uses were found in traditional Chinese medicine.

=== In religion and alchemy ===
==== In religion ====
Sulfur has a long history of religious associations and spiritual symbolism. In Antiquity, it was associated with the divine: used in fumigation to purify and prevent contagion, it was considered divine incense, and its name in Ancient Greek, theion (θεῖον) resembled a form of the word theios (θεῖος), divine. In the Iliad, Achilles is portrayed cleansing a cup with sulfur before making a libation to Zeus.

In the Christian Bible, sulfur is consistently associated with God's wrath, purification of evil and the punishment of sinners. The most well-known example is in the Book of Genesis, with the account of God's destruction of the cities of Sodom and Gomorrah by "brimstone and fire from the LORD out of heaven". Likewise, in Revelation, the Devil is cast in a lake of fire and brimstone (hence the idiom). Subsequently, sulfur's role as hellfire made it a symbol of Hell, its powerful, unpleasant smell becoming a feature of the Devil and demons in folklore and popular imagination.

==== In alchemy ====
Sulfur has also been a major ingredient in alchemy since its early days, different branches of Indian, Muslim and European alchemists ascribing it esoteric symbolism based on its strong bond with mercury and the interactions between the two elements. Greco-Alexandrian practitioners of Hellenistic alchemy like Mary the Jewess and Zosimos of Panopolis were interested in sulfur and sulfur compounds, and mentioned them in their writings. Indian alchemists, practitioners of the "science of chemicals" (Sanskrit: रसशास्त्र, romanized: rasaśāstra), wrote extensively about the use of sulfur in alchemical operations with mercury, from the eighth century AD onwards. In the rasaśāstra tradition, sulfur is called "the smelly" (गन्धक, gandhaka), and is thought to represent the feminine principle, the menstrual blood of the goddess Gauri (Shakti), while mercury is its male counterpart, the semen of Shiva. Alchemists in Europe and the Islamic world (basing themselves off the "sulfur-mercury theory of metals" from Arabic alchemical texts of the ninth century) had the opposite imagery in their traditions, with sulfur representing the masculine principle and mercury the feminine one, mixing together to form various metals. This theory of metals was very influential during the Middle Ages, and persisted until the eighteenth century, when Lavoisier proved that metals were distinct elements.

In the sixteenth century, Paracelsus added Salt as a third element to the Sulfur-Mercury dyad, making them the three basic pillars of alchemy according to his theory: the Tria Prima. Like most alchemical terms, the word "Sulfur" came to mean a lot of different things in alchemical works beyond its standard definition, representing concepts such as the active, masculine or fixing principle, combustion, or the soul. There were multiple "sulfurs", as the word was used as a Deckname, a secret codename for other substances.

==== Black sulfur ====
Sulfur

Black Sulfur

Alchemical signs for sulfur, or the combustible elements, and black sulfur, an impure type of sulfur also known as horse brimstone (sulfur caballinum)

Early European alchemists gave sulfur an alchemical symbol of a triangle atop a cross (🜍). Another type of sulfur mentioned in alchemy, black sulfur (sulfur nigrum), also had its own symbol combining a two-barred cross atop a lemniscate (🜏). This symbol was later used by Anton LaVey as a satanist symbol, the "Leviathan cross", as he associated it with the brimstone of Hell. This has led to some confusion and misconceptions about its original alchemical meaning: in alchemical texts, black sulfur was not a synonym for "brimstone" or an alternative symbol for sulfur as one of the Three Primes, but was instead considered a distinct type of sulfur, listed separately. Black sulfur, also known as grey sulfur (sulfur griseum) or "horse brimstone" (sulfur caballinum), was a grey, impure form of sulfur, usually the dregs of sulfur purification, which was used for medicinal purposes despite often containing arsenic. Iron shavings or hammerscale were sometimes added to it in its manufacture. The "horse" in the name is thought to reference its veterinary use: low quality sulfur, only fit to treat horses. In the 19th century, it was sometimes also sold under the name "sulphur of ivy" (a corruption of sulfur vivum) and used on hops.

=== In medicine ===
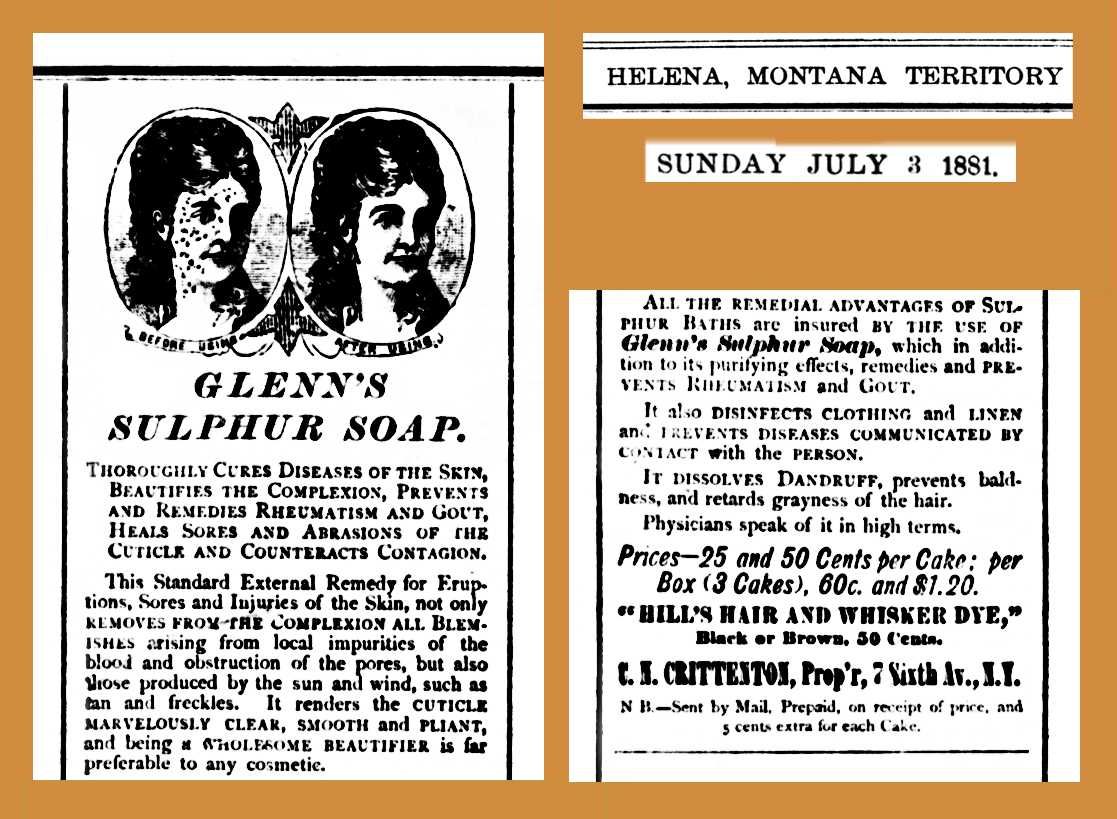
Sulfur has antifungal, antibacterial, and keratolytic activity; in the past it was used against acne vulgaris, rosacea, seborrheic dermatitis, dandruff, pityriasis versicolor, scabies, and warts. This 1881 advertisement baselessly claims efficacy against rheumatism, gout, baldness, and graying of hair.

The main use of sulfur for therapeutic purposes has been, throughout history, to cure people and domestic animals of a wide range of skin conditions and parasites. To this day, it remains a popular treatment to alleviate such conditions as scabies, ringworm, psoriasis, eczema, and acne. The exact mechanism of action is unknown, but it is thought to react with the cysteine in the skin to produce hydrogen sulfide, which has antifungal, antioxidant and keratolytic properties, as well as converting to pentathiolic acid, which is antifungal, when applied to the skin.

In 1696, Haarlem oil (colloquially known as "Dutch drops"), a sulfur-based potion, was created in Haarlem. Initially sold as a kidney diuretic, it acquired a reputation for being a panacea, and was popularized in other countries by sailors, among whom it was widely used. It is still commercialized three centuries later, and is now often used as a health supplement for horses.

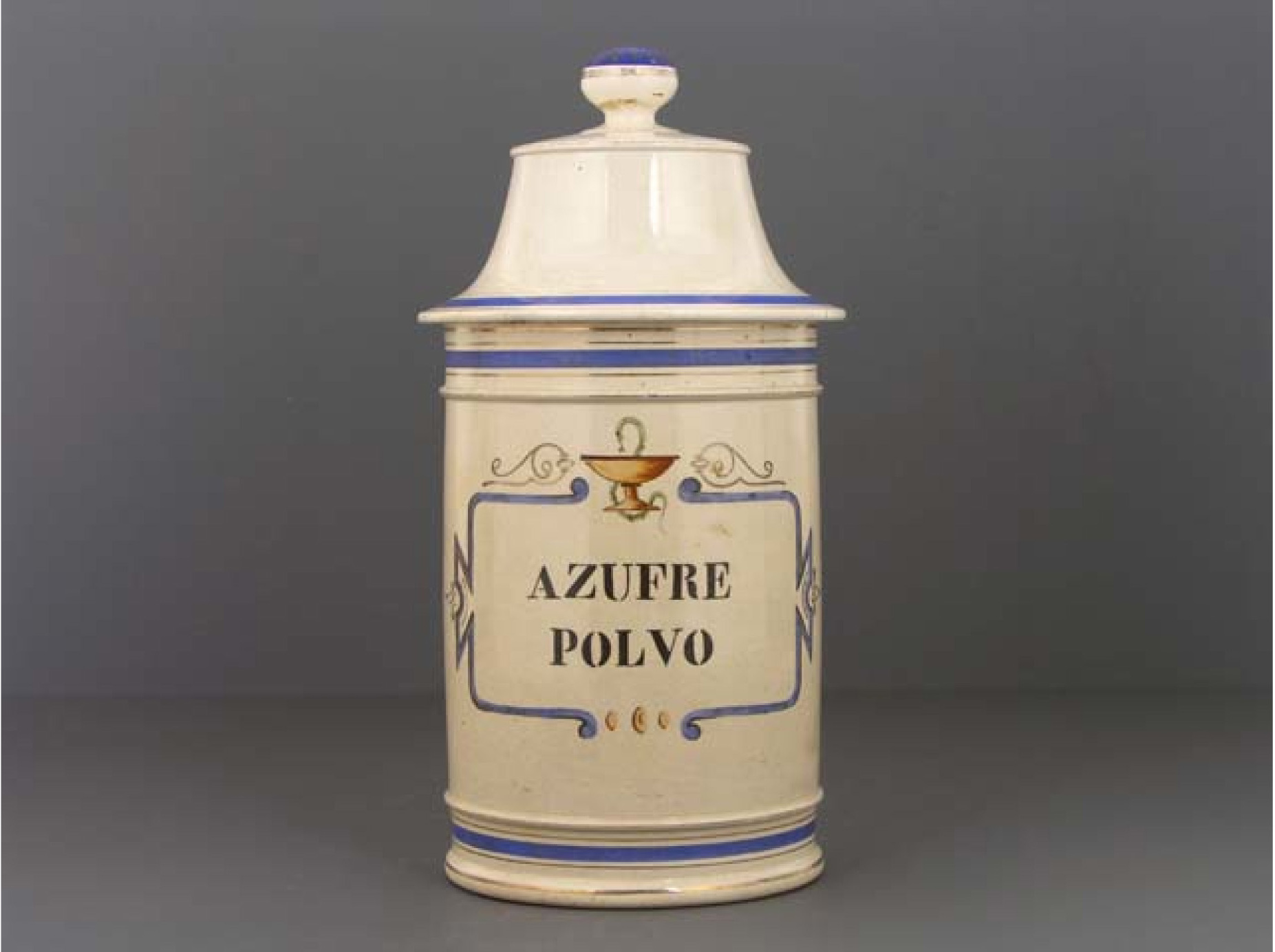
Pharmaceutical container for sulfur from the first half of the 20th century. From the Museo del Objeto del Objeto collection

In the 19th century, it was common to give children a mixture of sulfur and treacle as a remedy. The sulfur in it was meant to act as a spring tonic and a laxative. Reportedly foul-tasting, "brimstone and treacle" was considered by many an unpleasant childhood experience, and it is mentioned as such in a number of cultural references, including Mary Poppins, the works of Charles Dickens, and the controversial 1976 British play of the same name.

Madam C. J. Walker, who became the first female millionnaire by selling hair products for Black women in the early 1900s, notably used sulfur as an ingredient in her products.

Sulfur was also used in fumigations against the plague. In the early 20th century, during the Third Plague Pandemic, devices like the Clayton machine, used in harbors across the world, or the Sulfurozador in Latin America, were used to spread sulfur dioxide gas to kill insects, rats and pathogens.

=== Medieval and Early Modern period ===
==== In warfare ====
Sulfur has been hypothesized to have been part of the now-lost recipe for Greek fire, a powerful naval incendiary weapon used by the Byzantine Empire between the 7th and 15th century, but this remains debated. Regardless, it was present in Byzantine incendiary weapons, as the 12th century Byzantine princess and historian Anna Komnene mentioned a flammable mixture of pine resin and sulfur, blown through reed pipes to burn the enemy, in her Alexiad.

Sulfur was a tool of medieval siege warfare. Raymond of Aguilers described incendiary mixtures containing pitch, wax, sulfur and tow being thrown at the Crusaders during the siege of Jerusalem in 1099, and William of Tyre mentioned darts set on fire with sulfur, paste and oil.

In the 10th century, princess Olga of Kiev assieged the city of Iskorosten, seeking revenge against the Drevlians for the murder of her husband. Olga told her enemies they would only need to pay a small tribute if they surrendered: three pigeons and three sparrows from each household. They complied, and at night, she ordered her army to release the birds with pieces of hot sulfur tied to their legs. The birds flew back to their previous nests, setting them aflame and burning down the city.

One of the most significant historical applications of sulfur has been its role in the manufacture of black powder, which is a mixture of saltpeter, charcoal and sulfur. Black powder is thought to have been accidentally discovered by Chinese alchemists using saltpeter and sulfur as materials in their experiments to make gold or prepare an elixir of life. The Zhenyuan Miaodao Yaolue, a Taoist alchemical text from the Late Tang era, warned of a flammable mixture of saltpeter, realgar, sulfur, and honey burning the alchemists preparing it. In China, black powder was first used in fireworks for amusement and religious purposes, as well as in construction works, to blast rocks in order to open roads or waterways; no mention of it being used on the battlefield is made before the 10th century. In weapons, it was first used in incendiary projectiles such as fire arrows and grenades, later joined by the fire lance, an early firearm. The Wujing Zongyao of 1044 described formulas for Chinese black powder and listed a number of Chinese gunpowder weapons, accompanied by illustrations.

==== Torture and executions ====
The use of sulfur has been reported in some Early Modern executions by burning. In 1553, in Geneva, Spanish theologian Michael Servetus was condemned to be burned at the stake for heresy, wearing a wreath of straw and leaves sprayed with sulfur. In France, some of the people convicted of offenses punishable by burning were given a sulfur shirt ("chemise soufrée") to wear at the stake. This kind of garment has been mentioned in convictions for witchcraft, as with Urbain Grandier in 1634, and convictions for homosexuality, as with Jean Diot and Bruno Lenoir in 1750.

Sulfur was also part of the French punishment for regicide. The hand that held the assassination weapon would be scorched with flaming sulfur; the body of the culprit would be torn with pincers, and the wounds covered with molten lead, boiling oil, pitch, hot resin, wax and sulfur, before being quartered by horses. Such was the fate of Ravaillac for murdering Henry IV of France in 1610, and of Robert-François Damiens for his failed assassination attempt targeting Louis XV in 1757.

A sulfur-based torture device was used in 18th century Brittany by the local authorities. "Escarpins soufrés" or "chaussons soufrés" (meaning "sulfured slippers") were a pair of shoes, usually made of leather, smeared with sulfur to burn the victim's feet during interrogation.

==== Scientific and Chemical Revolutions ====
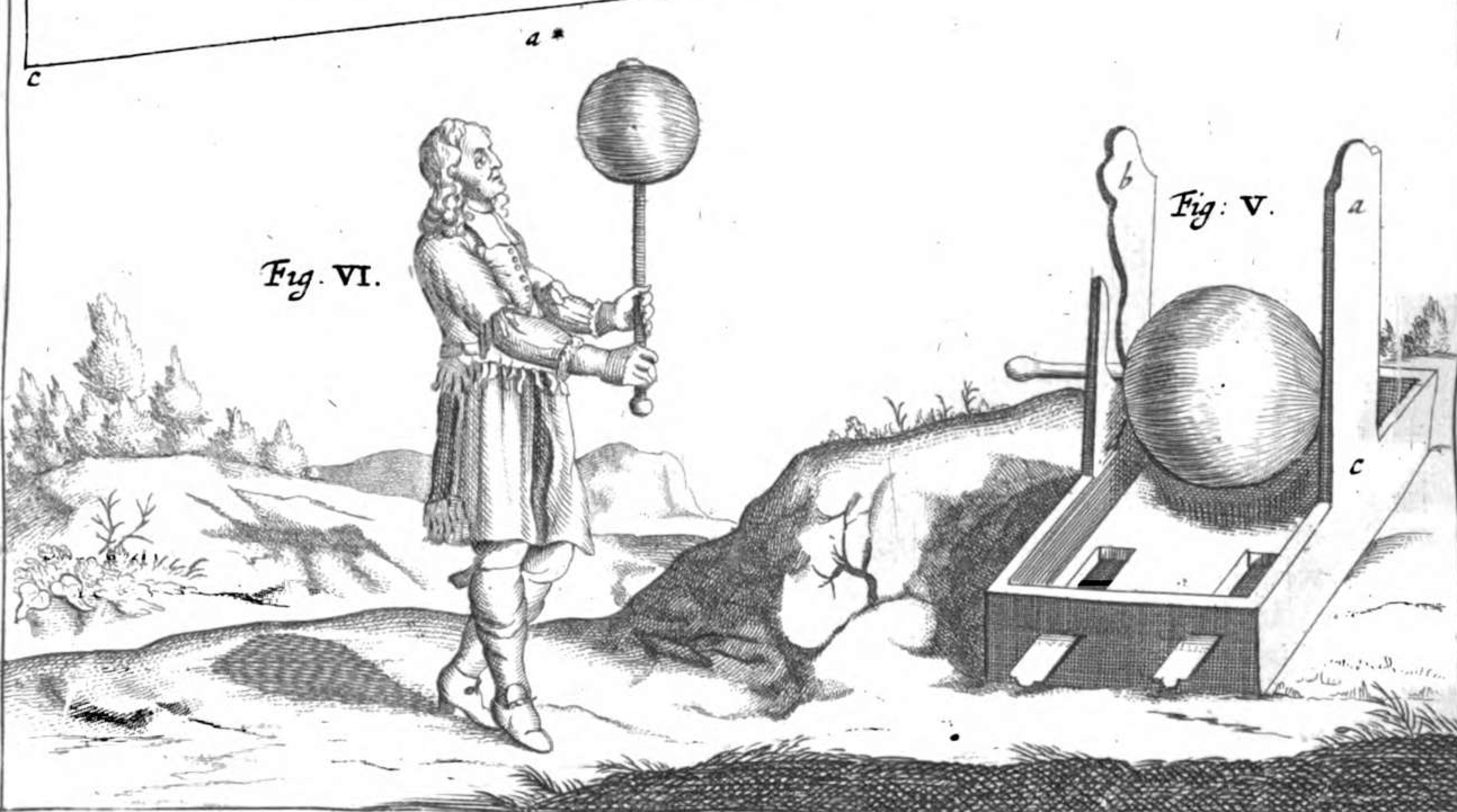
Guericke's sulfur globe experiments.

In 1660, German scientist Otto von Guericke studied static electricity by building a device comprising a large, rotating sulfur globe, now regarded as the first electrostatic generator.

Sulfur appeared in the 1718 "affinity table" of the French chemist Étienne-François Geoffroy, a document that would become influential in chemistry works of the 18th century. Also present in that table was the so-called "Sulfur Principle": at the time, many chemists were convinced that sulfur was not a standalone element but instead contained multiple substances, including a distinct flammable one. This was supported by the phlogiston theory of combustion, which had emerged few decades prior; Geoffroy would later consider the sulfurous principle in his table to be phlogiston. Widely accepted for a century, phlogiston theory was debunked by the work of Antoine Lavoisier on combustion and oxygen.

Antoine Lavoisier used sulfur in his combustion experiments, writing of some of these in 1777. In his 1789 Traité Élémentaire de Chimie, considered to be the first modern chemistry textbook, Lavoisier placed sulfur as its own chemical element in a "table of simple substances".

==== Other uses ====
Sulfur fumigation could be used to disinfect wine barrels and prevent wine spoilage: In the mid-15th century, under the reign of Frederick III, several imperial decrees forbade the use of sulfur in wine barrels in Germany (thus implying that it was an attested practice). The ban was relaxed by his successor, Maximilian I. The practice then spread to France; in the 17th century, French wines were known to be sulfured when exported, French white wines being particularly affected. The Netherlands, importer of French wine, had their own sulfuring process using "allumettes hollandaises" (Dutch wicks), and were said to excessively sulfur the wine. That type of heavily sulfured wine was called "vin muet" in French, and "stomme" in Dutch, which both translate to "silent wine". Mixing some stomme with wine would make the wine sweeter, as well as making it last longer. However, as sulfuring was known to alter the taste and to potentially transfer impurities like arsenic to the wine, there were some health concerns around it. The Netherlands therefore decided to ban stomme in 1613, but the practice nevertheless perdured.

In the late 18th century, furniture makers of German and Swiss origin in Pennsylvania, Maryland, Virginia and North Carolina used molten sulfur to produce decorative inlays. This type of inlay was mostly used on chests, schranks and clocks, but a wide range of surviving examples can be found, including tables, cupboards, cradles and many more. Similarly, a number of 18th century Lutheran tombstones, most of which with epitaphs in German, have been found in Maryland with a similar sulfur inlay. The origin of this technique is unclear, but it may have been inspired by the German use of marzipan sulfur molds (Schwefelform). Molten sulfur was poured in casts with designs carved, then solidified into that shape, creating a mold that could be used to make decorative marzipan pieces. The designs in the molds could be very detailed and ornate. The practice lasted until the 1950s in Central Europe, and some of the molds can still be found in German and Swiss museums.

Molten sulfur was sometimes used in construction from the 18th century on, as an easier and cheaper alternative to molten lead for purposes such as anchoring bolts into stone or concrete. There are mentions of an 18th century French practice in La Rochelle and Île de Ré, where the stones in some structures would be secured together using sheep or ox tibia bones encased in molten sulfur to anchor them, the use of other materials such as metal being deemed unsuitable due to seaside corrosion.

=== Modern times ===
Sulfur deposits in Sicily were the dominant source for more than a century. By the late 18th century, about 2,000 tonnes per year of sulfur were imported into Marseille, France, for the production of sulfuric acid for use in the Leblanc process. In industrializing Britain, with the repeal of tariffs on salt in 1824, demand for sulfur from Sicily surged. The increasing British control and exploitation of the mining, refining, and transportation of sulfur, coupled with the failure of this lucrative export to transform Sicily's backward and impoverished economy, led to the Sulfur Crisis of 1840, when King Ferdinand II gave a monopoly of the sulfur industry to a French firm, violating an earlier 1816 trade agreement with Britain. A peaceful solution was eventually negotiated by France.

In 1867, elemental sulfur was discovered in underground deposits in Louisiana and Texas. The highly successful Frasch process was developed to extract this resource, and the United States replaced Sicily as the main producer of sulfur worldwide in the early 20th century.

Since the advent of the contact process, the majority of sulfur is used to make sulfuric acid for a wide range of uses, particularly fertilizer.

In recent times, the main source of sulfur has become petroleum and natural gas. This is due to the requirement to remove sulfur from fuels in order to prevent acid rain, and has resulted in a surplus of sulfur.

=== Spelling and etymology ===
Sulfur is derived from the Latin word sulpur, which was Hellenized to sulphur in the erroneous belief that the Latin word came from Greek. This spelling was later reinterpreted as representing an /f/ sound and resulted in the spelling sulfur, which appears in Latin toward the end of the Classical period. The Ancient Greek word for sulfur, θεῖον, theîon (from earlier θέειον, théeion), is the source of the international chemical prefix thio-.

In 12th-century Anglo-French, it was sulfre. In the 14th century, the erroneously Hellenized Latin -ph- was restored in Middle English sulphre. By the 15th century, both full Latin spelling variants sulfur and sulphur became common in English. The parallel f~ph spellings continued in Britain until the 19th century, when the word was standardized as sulphur. In the U.S., Webster's Dictionary (1828) lists only sulphur, and sulfur only becomes the primary entry in 1961. Nonetheless, the form sulfur was widely adopted in the United States during the 19th century. Canada uses both spellings.

The IUPAC adopted the spelling sulfur in 1990. UK institutions soon followed: the Royal Society of Chemistry in 1992; the British Standards Institute in 1993; the UK national school curriculum in 2000 (there was some controversy). It is now the more common spelling in British books. The World Health Organization has mandated sulfur since at least 1993. The 1989 edition of the Oxford English Dictionary gave sulphur as the headword, and listed sulfur as a U.S. spelling; the current edition gives sulfur first, which indicates that it is the usual British spelling.

== Production ==
Sulfur production

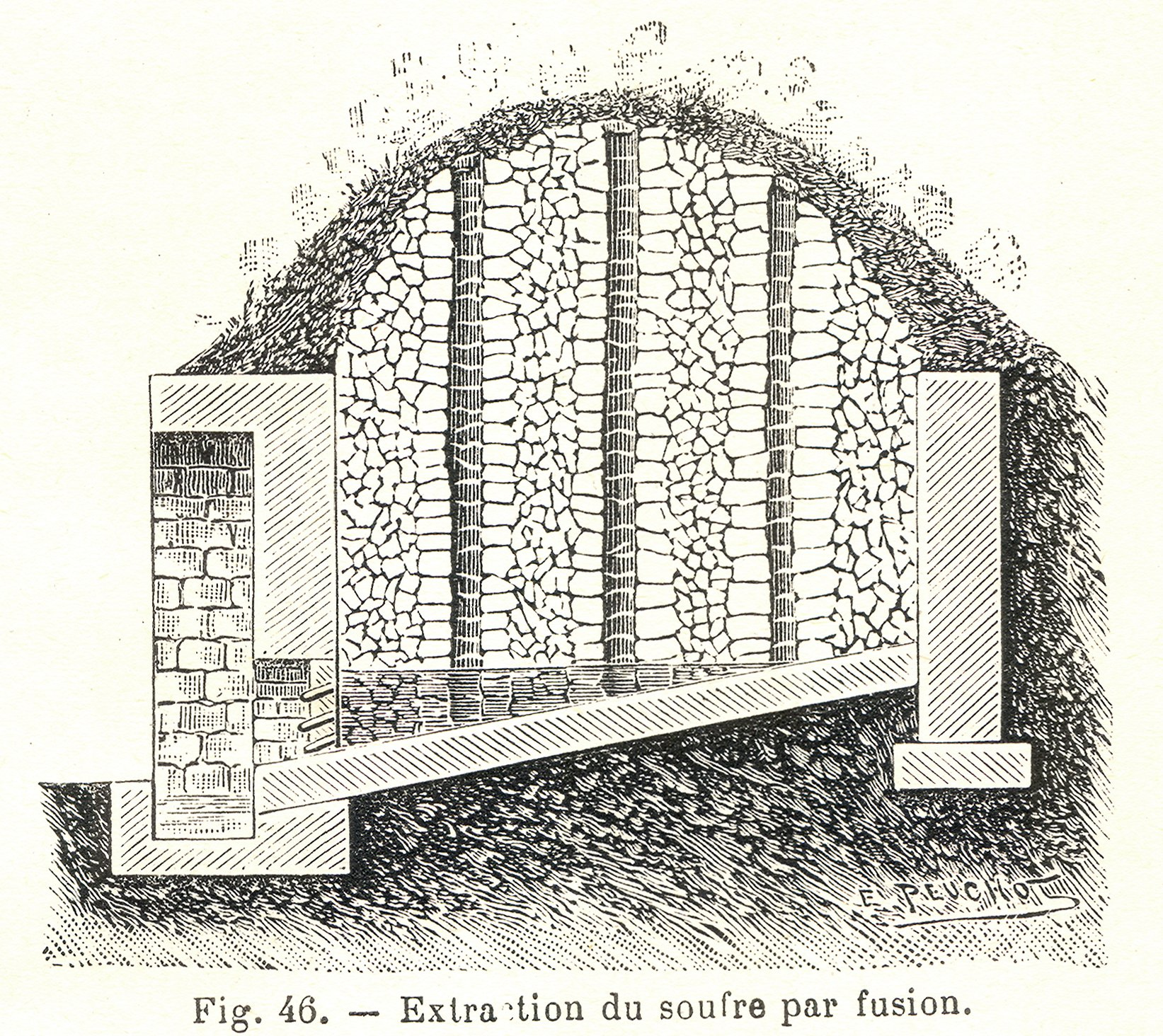
Sicilian kiln used to obtain sulfur from volcanic rock (diagram from a 1906 chemistry book)

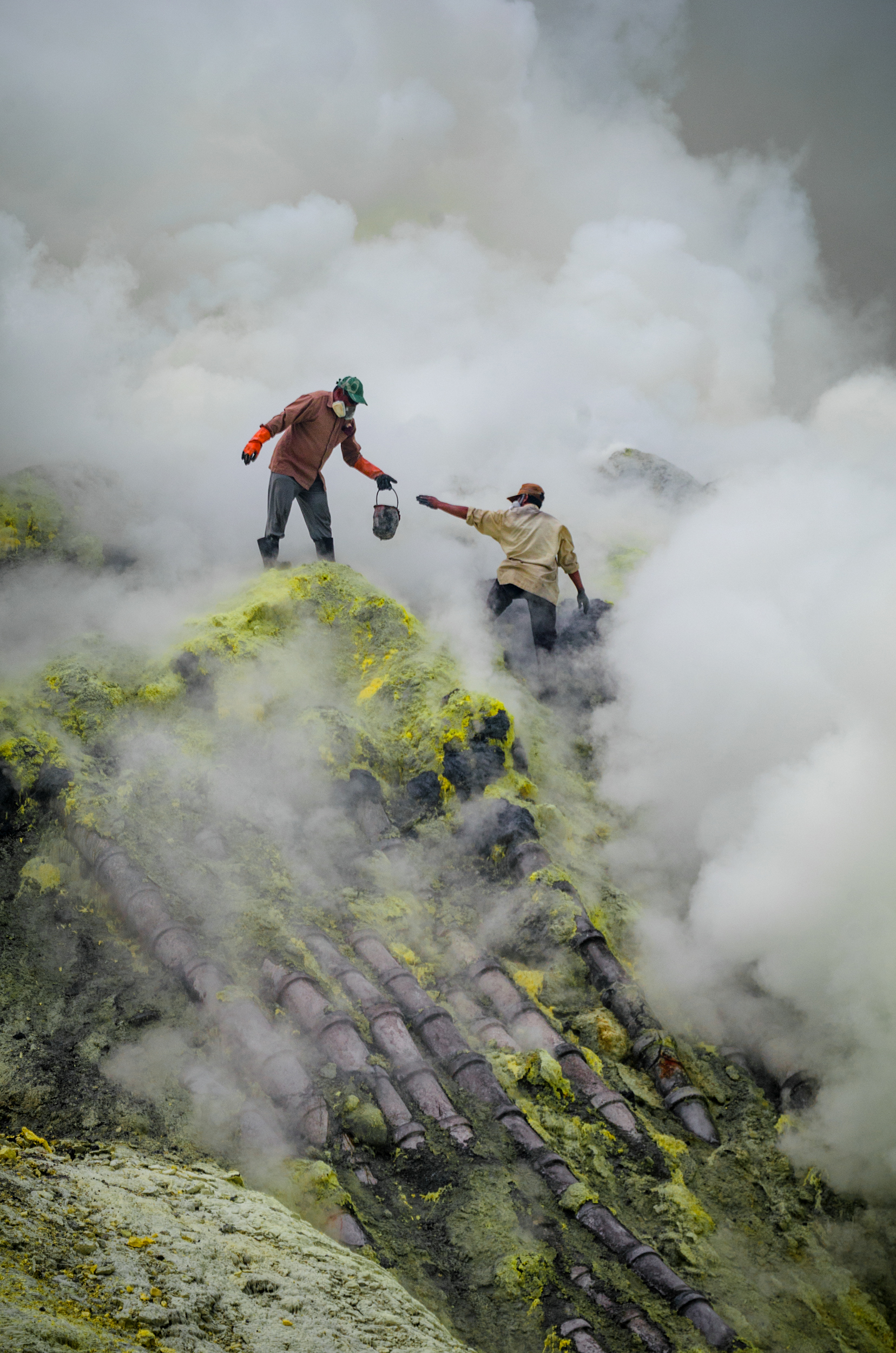
Traditional sulfur mining at Ijen Volcano, East Java, Indonesia. This image shows the dangerous and rugged conditions the miners face, including toxic smoke and high drops, as well as their lack of protective equipment. The pipes over which they are standing are for condensing sulfur vapors.

Sulfur may be found by itself and historically was usually obtained in this form; pyrite has also been a source of sulfur. In volcanic regions in Sicily, in ancient times, it was found on the surface of the Earth, and the "Sicilian process" was used: sulfur deposits were piled and stacked in brick kilns built on sloping hillsides, with airspaces between them. Then, some sulfur was pulverized, spread over the stacked ore and ignited, causing the free sulfur to melt down the hills. Eventually the surface-borne deposits played out, and miners excavated veins that ultimately dotted the Sicilian landscape with labyrinthine mines. Mining was unmechanized and labor-intensive, with pickmen freeing the ore from the rock, and mine-boys or carusi carrying baskets of ore to the surface, often through a mile or more of tunnels. Once the ore was at the surface, it was reduced and extracted in smelting ovens. The conditions in Sicilian sulfur mines were horrific, prompting Booker T. Washington to write "I am not prepared just now to say to what extent I believe in a physical hell in the next world, but a sulfur mine in Sicily is about the nearest thing to hell that I expect to see in this life." Sulfur is still mined from surface deposits in poorer nations with volcanoes, such as Indonesia, and problems with working conditions still exist.

Elemental sulfur was extracted from salt domes (where it sometimes occurs in nearly pure form) until the late 20th century, when it became a side product of other industrial processes such as in oil refining, in which sulfur is undesirable. As a mineral, native sulfur under salt domes is thought to be a fossil mineral resource, produced by the action of anaerobic bacteria on sulfate deposits. It was removed from such salt-dome mines mainly by the Frasch process. In this method, superheated water was pumped into a native sulfur deposit to melt the sulfur, and then compressed air returned the 99.5% pure melted product to the surface. Throughout the 20th century this procedure produced elemental sulfur that required no further purification. Due to a limited number of such sulfur deposits and the high cost of working them, this process for mining sulfur has not had significant use anywhere in the world since 2002.

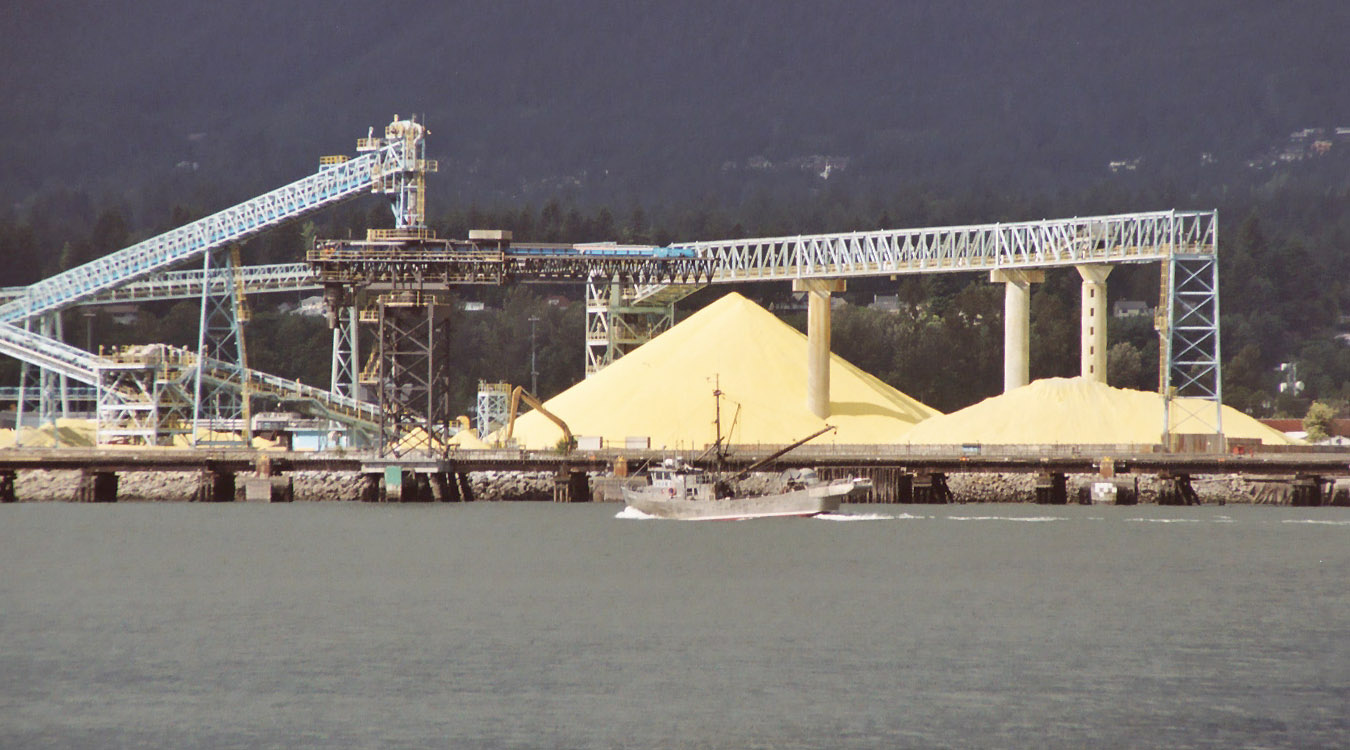
Sulfur recovered from hydrocarbons in Alberta, stockpiled for shipment in North Vancouver, British Columbia

Since then, sulfur has typically been produced from petroleum, natural gas, and related fossil resources, from which it is obtained mainly as hydrogen sulfide. Organosulfur compounds, undesirable impurities in petroleum, may be upgraded by subjecting them to hydrodesulfurization, which cleaves the C–S bonds:

R-S-R + 2 H_{2} → 2 RH + H_{2}S

The resulting hydrogen sulfide from this process, and also as it occurs in natural gas, is converted into elemental sulfur by the Claus process, which entails oxidation of some hydrogen sulfide to sulfur dioxide and then the comproportionation of the two:

3 O_{2} + 2 H_{2}S → 2 SO_{2} + 2 H_{2}O
SO_{2} + 2 H_{2}S → 3 S + 2 H_{2}O

Production and price (US market) of elemental sulfur

Due to the high sulfur content of the Athabasca Oil Sands, stockpiles of elemental sulfur from this process exist throughout Alberta, Canada. Another way of storing sulfur is as a binder for concrete, the resulting product having some desirable properties (see sulfur concrete).

The world production of sulfur in 2011 amounted to 69 million tonnes (Mt), with more than 15 countries contributing more than 1 Mt each. Countries producing more than 5 Mt are China (9.6), the United States (8.8), Canada (7.1) and Russia (7.1). Production has been slowly increasing from 1900 to 2010; the price was unstable in the 1980s and around 2010.

== Applications ==
=== Sulfuric acid ===
Elemental sulfur is used mainly as a precursor to other chemicals. Approximately 85% (1989) is converted to sulfuric acid (H_{2}SO_{4}):

S_{8} + 12 O_{2} + 8 H_{2}O → 8 H_{2}SO_{4}

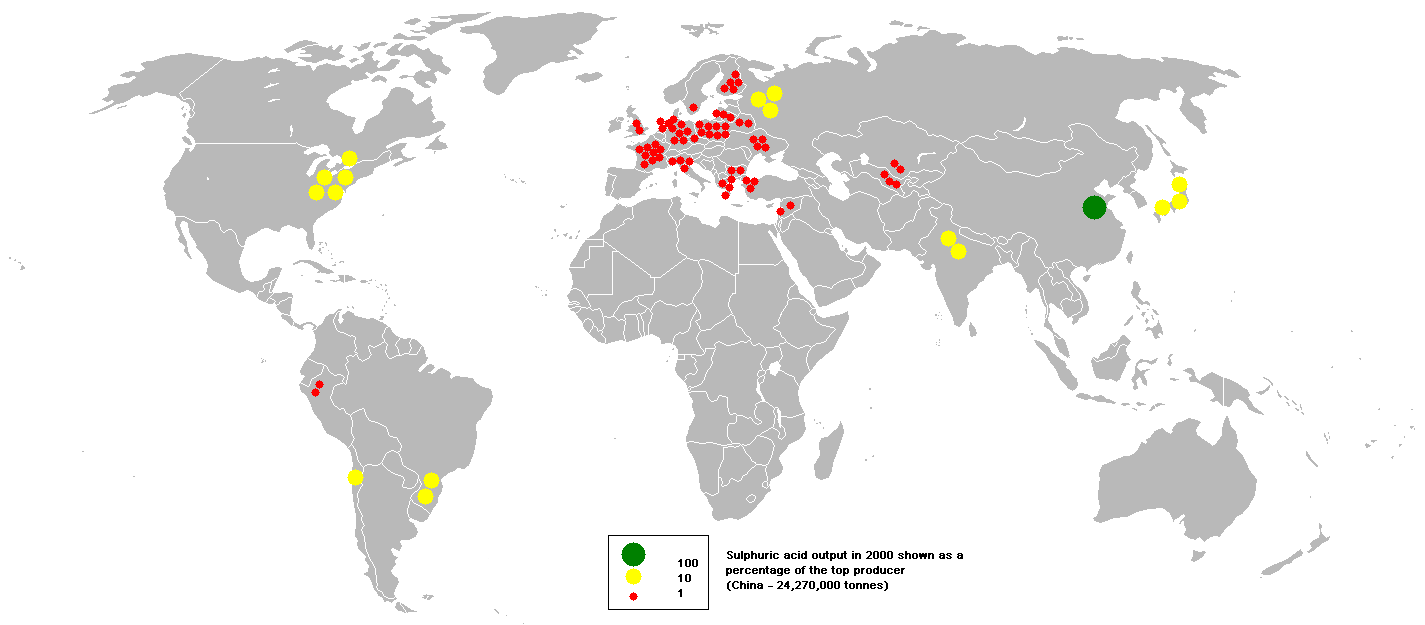
Sulfuric acid production in 2000

In 2010, the United States produced more sulfuric acid than any other inorganic industrial chemical. The principal use for the acid is the extraction of phosphate ores for the production of fertilizer manufacturing. Other applications of sulfuric acid include oil refining, wastewater processing, and mineral extraction.

=== Carbon disulfide ===
Sulfur reacts directly with methane to give carbon disulfide, which is used to manufacture cellophane and rayon.

=== Vulcanization of rubber ===
Sulfur–sulfur bonds are a structural component used to stiffen rubber, similar to the disulfide bridges that rigidify proteins. In the most common type of industrial "curing" or hardening and strengthening of natural rubber, elemental sulfur is heated with the rubber to the point that chemical reactions form disulfide bridges between isoprene units of the polymer. This process, patented in 1843, made rubber a major industrial product, especially in automobile tires. Because of the heat and sulfur, the process was named vulcanization, after the Roman god of the forge and volcanism.

=== Pulping ===
Large quantities of sulfites are used to bleach paper and to preserve dried fruit. Many surfactants and detergents (e.g. sodium lauryl sulfate) are sulfate derivatives. Calcium sulfate, gypsum (CaSO_{4}·2H_{2}O) is mined on the scale of 100 million tonnes each year for use in Portland cement and fertilizers.

When silver-based photography was widespread, sodium and ammonium thiosulfate were widely used as "fixing agents". Sulfur is a component of gunpowder ("black powder").

=== Batteries ===
Batteries that use sulfur as the cathode have been commercialized. Most successful is the sodium-sulfur battery operating near 300 ºC. Relevant reactions are:

Na → Na^{+} + e^{−}
S_{8} + 2e^{−} → S^{2−}_{8}

Some technical challenges are safety issues associated with molten alkali metal and the resiliency of the containers toward aggressive polysulfides.

More aspirational are Na-S and Li-S batteries that operate near room temperature.

=== Fungicide and pesticide ===
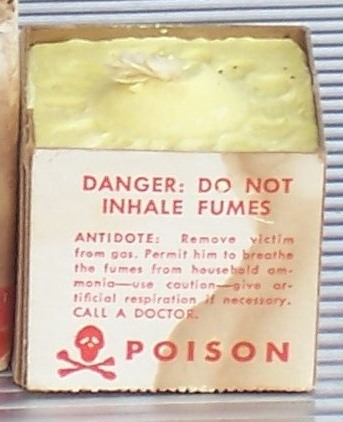
Sulfur candle originally sold for home fumigation

Elemental sulfur is one of the oldest fungicides and pesticides. "Dusting sulfur", elemental sulfur in powdered form, is a common fungicide for grapes, strawberry, many vegetables and several other crops. It has a good efficacy against a wide range of powdery mildew diseases as well as black spot. In organic production, sulfur is the most important fungicide. It is the only fungicide used in organically farmed apple production against the main disease apple scab under colder conditions.

Standard-formulation dusting sulfur is applied to crops with a sulfur duster or from a dusting plane. Wettable sulfur is the commercial name for dusting sulfur formulated with additional ingredients to make it water miscible. It has similar applications and is used as a fungicide against mildew and other mold-related problems with plants and soil.

=== Fertilizer ===
Sulfur is an essential nutrient for all plants. It is absorbed by plant roots as sulfate. Most of the sulfate comes from weathering of sulfate minerals such as gypsum, and it is replenished by deposition from the atmosphere as sulfates and sulfur dioxide (SO_{2}, which is oxidized to sulfate) arising mostly from the burning of fossil fuels that contain sulfur. The sulfates commonly found in soils are usually a sufficient natural source for growth of plants and microorganisms, so in most agricultural soils, sulfur is not a limiting nutrient for crop growth. However, in some regions, agricultural soils have been depleted in sulfate, by leaching and by extraction from the soil by crops. The reduction in burning of sulfur-containing fuels over the past decades, the result of actions taken to limit acid rain, has reduced the rate of replenishment from the atmosphere, and sulfur deficiency in soil has become widespread in many parts of the world. As a result, sulfur is increasingly used as a component of fertilizers.

Common forms of sulfur fertilizer are sulfate compounds such as ammonium sulfate, calcium sulfate (as gypsum, CaSO_{4}·2H_{2}O), and potassium sulfate; and thiosulfates, mainly ammonium thiosulfate. Elemental sulfur is also used as a fertilizer, but it is hydrophobic and insoluble in water, and cannot be used directly by plants. It must be first be oxidized to sulfate to be absorbed by plants, a process carried out by sulfur-oxidizing bacteria such as Acidithiobacillus thiooxidans, which use the oxidation of elemental sulfur as their primary energy source. This process may take many months to build up a sufficient bacterial population to convert deposited sulfur to sulfate. The slow pace of this conversion is put to use in slow-release fertilizers such as urea granules coated with elemental sulfur, where the release of nitrogen depends on the breakdown of the sulfur coating.

=== Pharmaceuticals ===
Sulfur (specifically octasulfur, S_{8}) is used in pharmaceutical skin preparations for the treatment of acne and other conditions. It acts as a keratolytic agent and also kills bacteria, fungi, scabies mites, and other parasites. Precipitated sulfur and colloidal sulfur are used, in the form of lotions, creams, powders, soaps, and bath additives, for the treatment of acne vulgaris, acne rosacea, and seborrhoeic dermatitis.

Many drugs contain sulfur. Early examples include antibacterial sulfonamides, known as sulfa drugs. A more recent example is mucolytic acetylcysteine. Sulfur is a part of many bacterial defense molecules. Most β-lactam antibiotics, including the penicillins, cephalosporins and monobactams contain sulfur.

== Biological role ==
Sulfur is an essential component of all living cells. It is the eighth most abundant element in the human body by weight, about equal in abundance to potassium, and slightly greater than sodium and chlorine. A 70 kg (150 lb) human body contains about 140 grams (4.9 oz) of sulfur. The main dietary source of sulfur for humans is sulfur-containing amino acids, which can be found in plant and animal proteins.

=== Transferring sulfur between inorganic and biomolecules ===
In the 1880s, while studying Beggiatoa (a bacterium living in a sulfur rich environment), Sergei Winogradsky found that it oxidized hydrogen sulfide (H_{2}S) as an energy source, forming intracellular sulfur droplets. Winogradsky referred to this form of metabolism as inorgoxidation (oxidation of inorganic compounds). Another contributor, who continued to study it was Selman Waksman. Primitive bacteria that live around deep ocean volcanic vents oxidize hydrogen sulfide for their nutrition, as discovered by Robert Ballard.

Sulfur oxidizers can use as energy sources reduced sulfur compounds, including hydrogen sulfide, elemental sulfur, sulfite, thiosulfate, and various polythionates (e.g., tetrathionate). They depend on enzymes such as sulfur oxygenase and sulfite oxidase to oxidize sulfur to sulfate. Some lithotrophs can even use the energy contained in sulfur compounds to produce sugars, a process known as chemosynthesis. Some bacteria and archaea use hydrogen sulfide in place of water as the electron donor in chemosynthesis, a process similar to photosynthesis that produces sugars and uses oxygen as the electron acceptor. Sulfur-based chemosynthesis may be simplifiedly compared with photosynthesis:

H_{2}S + CO_{2} → sugars + S
H_{2}O + CO_{2} → sugars + O_{2}

There are bacteria combining these two ways of nutrition: green sulfur bacteria and purple sulfur bacteria. Also sulfur-oxidizing bacteria can go into symbiosis with larger organisms, enabling the later to use hydrogen sulfide as food to be oxidized. Example: the giant tube worm.

There are sulfate-reducing bacteria, that, by contrast, "breathe sulfate" instead of oxygen. They use organic compounds or molecular hydrogen as the energy source. They use sulfur as the electron acceptor, and reduce various oxidized sulfur compounds back into sulfide, often into hydrogen sulfide. They can grow on other partially oxidized sulfur compounds (e.g. thiosulfates, thionates, polysulfides, sulfites).

There are studies pointing that many deposits of native sulfur in places that were the bottom of the ancient oceans have biological origin. These studies indicate that this native sulfur have been obtained through biological activity, but what is responsible for that (sulfur-oxidizing bacteria or sulfate-reducing bacteria) is still unknown for sure.

Sulfur is absorbed by plants roots from soil as sulfate and transported as a phosphate ester. Sulfate is reduced to sulfide via sulfite before it is incorporated into cysteine and other organosulfur compounds.

SO^{2−}_{4} → SO^{2−}_{3} → H_{2}S → cysteine (thiol) → methionine (thioether)

While the plants' role in transferring sulfur to animals by food chains is more or less understood, the role of sulfur bacteria is just getting investigated.

=== Metalloproteins and inorganic cofactors ===
Metalloproteins—in which the active site is a transition metal ion (or metal-sulfide cluster) often coordinated by sulfur atoms of cysteine residues—are essential components of enzymes involved in electron transfer processes. Examples include plastocyanin (Cu^{2+}) and nitrous oxide reductase (Cu–S). The function of these enzymes is dependent on the fact that the transition metal ion can undergo redox reactions. Other examples include many zinc proteins, as well as iron–sulfur clusters. Most pervasive are the ferrodoxins, which serve as electron shuttles in cells. In bacteria, the important nitrogenase enzymes contain an Fe–Mo–S cluster and is a catalyst that performs the important function of nitrogen fixation, converting atmospheric nitrogen to ammonia that can be used by microorganisms and plants to make proteins, DNA, RNA, alkaloids, and the other organic nitrogen compounds necessary for life.

Sulfur is also present in molybdenum cofactor.

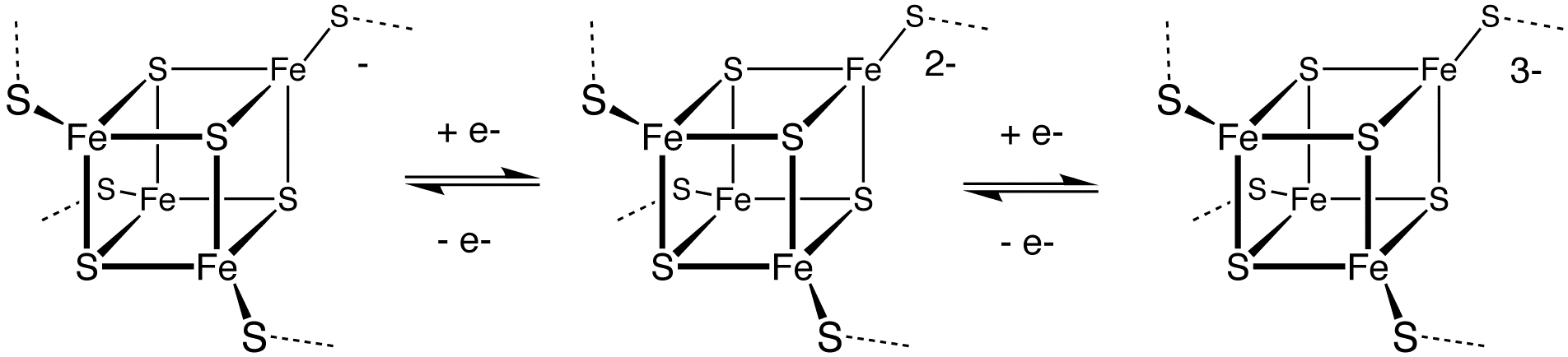
Easiness of electron flow in a cluster provides catalytic effect of a respective enzyme.

=== Deficiency ===
In humans methionine is an essential amino acid; cysteine is conditionally essential and may be synthesized from non-essential serine via sulfur salvaged from methionine. Sulfur deficiency is uncommon due to the ubiquity of cysteine and methionine in food.

Isolated sulfite oxidase deficiency is a rare, fatal genetic disease caused by mutations to sulfite oxidase, which is needed to metabolize sulfites to sulfates.

== Precautions ==
Sulfur
Hazards
- GHS labelling
Pictograms	(GHS07: Exclamation mark) (GHS02: Flammable)
Signal word	Warning
Hazard statements	H315
NFPA 704 (fire diamond)	2 1 0

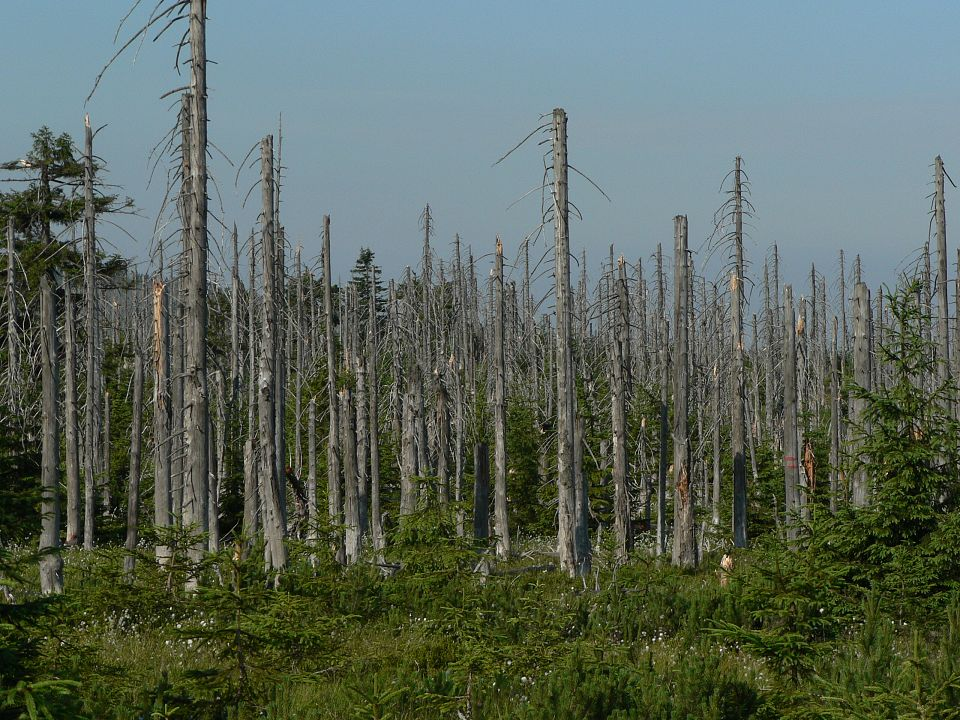
Effect of acid rain on a forest, Jizera Mountains, Czech Republic

Though elemental sulfur is only minimally absorbed through the skin and is of low toxicity to humans, inhalation of sulfur dust or contact with eyes or skin may cause irritation. Excessive ingestion of sulfur can cause a burning sensation or diarrhea, and cases of life-threatening metabolic acidosis have been reported after patients deliberately consumed sulfur as a folk remedy.

=== Toxicity ===
Elemental forms of sulfur are insoluble in water and are non-toxic.

== See also ==
- Blue lava
- Stratospheric sulfur aerosols
- Sulfur assimilation
- Sulfur isotope biogeochemistry
- Ultra-low-sulfur diesel
