= Haarlem oil =

Dietary supplement

Haarlem oil in 2013

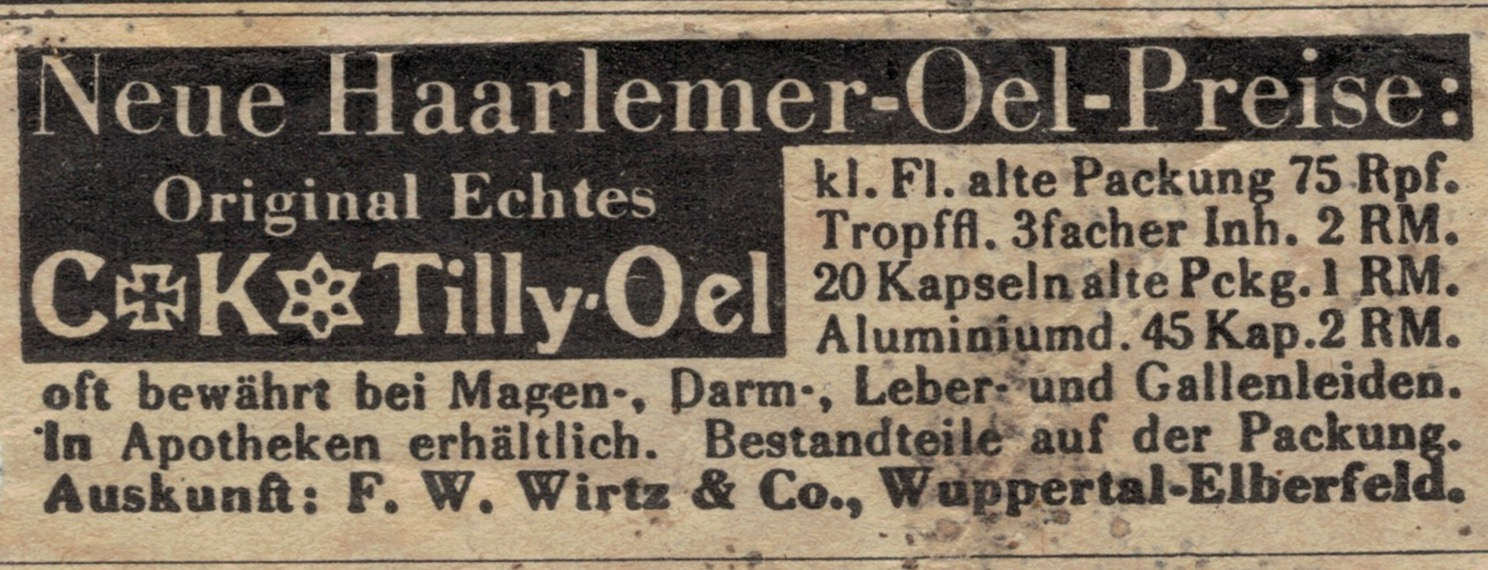
Old german advertisement for Haarlem oil as cure for stomach, gut, liver and bile sickness.

Haarlem oil (Dutch: haarlemmerolie), also called medicamentum gratia probatum, is a patent medicine and dietary supplement. The potion is a mixture of sulfur, herbs and terebinth oil. It is produced in Haarlem, Netherlands.

It was invented in 1696 by Claes Tilly and was marketed as a cure for many ailments.

The word haarlemmerolie (with a lowercase 'h') is now used in Dutch to indicate a fix for all problems. For example: "lowering taxes will be like haarlemmerolie for the economy". This is also used sarcastically.
