= Sulfur inlay =

Decorative cabinetry technique

Sulfur inlay is a rarely used technique for decorative surface inlay in wooden cabinetmaking.

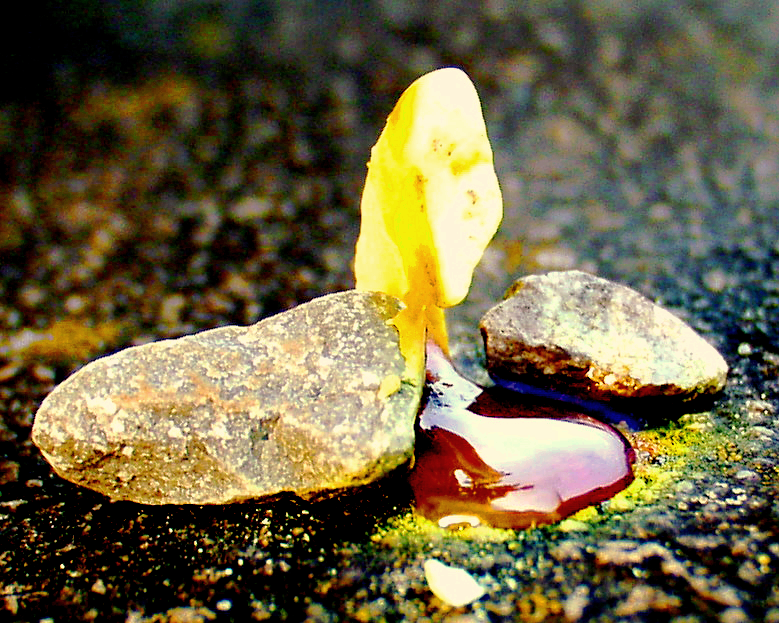
Liquid sulfur

The technique originates in the 18th century, but was only used for a short period. Between 1765 and around 1820, German immigrant cabinetmakers in Lancaster County, Pennsylvania, used it to decorate the surface of chests. The Deitrich chest of 1783 is now in the Smithsonian.

Commercial reproducers of such chests may rarely re-create this inlay technique as well.

== Technique ==
The inlay technique is simple. A small groove is carved into the surface of the wood, then molten sulfur is poured into the groove. Once cooled and hard, the surface may easily be scraped flush.

Sulfur is used as it has a low melting point, easily achieved on a hotplate. This also reduces the risk of charring the wood with a hotter liquid inlay material. On cooling, sulfur also expands slightly, locking it into place.

The colour of the sulfur inlay is a pale yellow or off-white. Overheating the sulfur causes it to darken to brown, and also produces noxious fumes and a risk of fire.

Antiquarians unfamiliar with sulfur inlay have mistaken old examples for varieties of beeswax or white lead.

== Related techniques ==
- Pewter may be inlaid by a similar process, albeit rather hotter, giving a silvery metallic inlay. Wood's metal has also been used as a low-temperature alternative.
- Sulfur has also been used as a historical hot-melt glue for setting ironwork into stone, or for bonding stone together.
- Niello uses the darkening effect of sulfur compounds on silver.
