= Indian alchemy =

Indian alchemy may refer to:

- Rasayana
- Rasashastra
- History of metallurgy in the Indian subcontinent

== See also ==
- A History of Hindu Chemistry, a two-volume book by Prafulla Chandra Ray published in 1902 and 1909
