= Sulfur dioxygenase =

Class of enzymes

Identifiers
- EC no.: 1.13.11.18
- CAS no.: 37256-58-9

Databases
- IntEnz: IntEnz view
- BRENDA: BRENDA entry
- ExPASy: NiceZyme view
- KEGG: KEGG entry
- MetaCyc: metabolic pathway
- PRIAM: profile
- PDB structures: RCSB PDB PDBe PDBsum
Search
- PMC: articles
- PubMed: articles
- NCBI: proteins

Sulfur dioxygenase (EC 1.13.11.18, sulfur oxygenase, sulfur:oxygen oxidoreductase) is an enzyme with systematic name S-sulfanylglutathione:oxygen oxidoreductase. This enzyme catalyses the following chemical reaction

sulfur + O_{2} + H_{2}O $\rightleftharpoons$ sulfite + 2 H^{+} (overall reaction)
(1a) glutathione + sulfur $\rightleftharpoons$ S-sulfanylglutathione (spontaneous reaction)
(1b) S-sulfanylglutathione + O_{2} + H_{2}O $\rightleftharpoons$ glutathione + sulfite + 2 H^{+}

This enzyme contains iron.

In humans, sulfur dioxygenase is needed to detoxify sulfide.
