= Sulfur oxide =

Sulfur oxides (SOx) are a group of chemical compounds composed of sulfur and oxygen. The most common sulfur oxides are sulfur dioxide (SO_{2}) and sulfur trioxide (SO_{3}). Sulfur oxides are produced naturally through volcanic activity and are also released into the atmosphere from human activities like burning fossil fuels and industrial processes.

- Lower sulfur oxides (S_{n}O, S_{7}O_{2} and S_{6}O_{2})
- Sulfur monoxide (SO) and its dimer, disulfur dioxide (S_{2}O_{2})
- Sulfur dioxide (SO_{2})
- Sulfur trioxide (SO_{3})
- Higher sulfur oxides (SO_{3}, SO_{4}, and polymeric condensates of them)
- Disulfur monoxide (S_{2}O)
