= Empirical formula =

Simplest whole number ratio of atoms present in a compound

In chemistry, the empirical formula of a chemical compound is the simplest whole number ratio of atoms present in a compound. For example, sulfur monoxide and disulfur dioxide, both compounds of sulfur and oxygen, both have the empirical formula SO. However, their molecular formulas, which express the number of atoms in each molecule of a chemical compound, are SO and S_{2}O_{2}, respectively.

An empirical formula makes no mention of the arrangement or number of atoms. It is standard for many ionic compounds, like calcium chloride (CaCl_{2}), and for macromolecules, such as silicon dioxide (SiO_{2}).

The molecular formula, on the other hand, shows the number of each type of atom in a molecule. The structural formula shows the arrangement of the molecule. It is also possible for different types of compounds to have equal empirical formulas.

In the early days of chemistry, information regarding the composition of compounds came from elemental analysis, which gives information about the relative amounts of elements present in a compound, which can be written as percentages or mole ratios. However, chemists were not able to determine the exact amounts of these elements and were only able to know their ratios, hence the name "empirical formula". Since ionic compounds are extended networks of anions and cations, all formulas of ionic compounds are empirical.

== Examples ==
- Glucose (C_{6}H_{12}O_{6}), ribose (C_{5}H_{10}O_{5}), acetic acid (C_{2}H_{4}O_{2}), and formaldehyde (CH_{2}O) all have different molecular formulas but the same empirical formula: CH_{2}O. This is the actual molecular formula for formaldehyde, but acetic acid has double the number of atoms, ribose has five times the number of atoms, and glucose has six times the number of atoms.

== Calculation example ==
A chemical analysis of a sample of methyl acetate provides the following elemental data: 48.64% carbon (C), 8.16% hydrogen (H), and 43.20% oxygen (O). For the purposes of determining empirical formulas, it's assumed that we have 100 grams of the compound. If this is the case, the percentages will be equal to the mass of each element in grams.

Step 1: Change each percentage to an expression of the mass of each element in grams. That is, 48.64% C becomes 48.64 g C, 8.16% H becomes 8.16 g H, and 43.20% O becomes 43.20 g O.

Step 2: Convert the amount of each element in grams to its amount in moles
$$\left(\frac{48.64 \mbox{ g C}}{1}\right)\left(\frac{1 \mbox{ mol }}{12.01 \mbox{ g C}}\right) = 4.049\ \text{mol}$$
$$\left(\frac{8.16 \mbox{ g H}}{1}\right)\left(\frac{1 \mbox{ mol }}{1.007 \mbox{ g H}}\right) = 8.095\ \text{mol}$$
$$\left(\frac{43.20 \mbox{ g O}}{1}\right)\left(\frac{1 \mbox{ mol }}{16.00 \mbox{ g O}}\right) = 2.7\ \text{mol}$$

Step 3: Divide each of the resulting values by the smallest of these values (2.7)
$$\frac{4.049 \mbox{ mol }}{2.7 \mbox{ mol }} = 1.5$$
$$\frac{8.095 \mbox{ mol }}{2.7 \mbox{ mol }} = 3$$
$$\frac{2.7 \mbox{ mol }}{2.7 \mbox{ mol }} = 1$$

Step 4: If necessary, multiply these numbers by integers in order to get whole numbers; if an operation is done to one of the numbers, it must be done to all of them.
$$1.5 \times 2 = 3$$
$$3 \times 2 = 6$$
$$1 \times 2 = 2$$

Thus, the empirical formula of methyl acetate is C_{3}H_{6}O_{2}. This formula also happens to be methyl acetate's molecular formula.
