= Transition metal complexes of sulfur monoxide =

Transition metal complexes of sulfur monoxide refers to coordination complexes with sulfur monoxide (SO) as a ligand. The topic is relevant to the metal-promoted redox reactions of sulfur and sulfur oxides. Sulfur monoxide is unstable in condensed form, so its complexes are almost always prepared indirectly, e.g., using reagents that release SO.

== Bonding modes ==
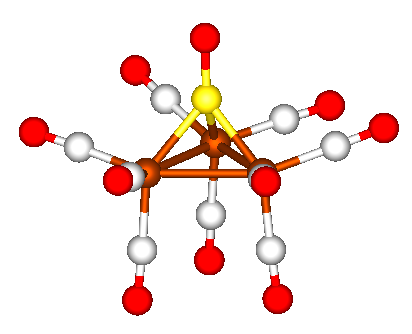
Structure of [Fe_{3}(SO)(CO)_{9}]^{2-}. Color code: red = O, yellow = S.

SO can bond to metals in a number ways:

- a terminal ligand, with a bent M−S−O arrangement, analogous structurally to "bent" nitrosyl. In such cases, SO is a Lewis base. An example is IrCl(P(i-Pr)_{3})_{2}(SO) (i-Pr = isopropyl).
- triply bridging as in Fe_{3}(μ^{3}-S)(μ^{3}-SO)(CO)_{9}. In such cases SO is a 4-electron donor.
- Bridging with the μ-η^{1},η^{1}-SO motif. Another bridging mode is μ-η^{1},η^{2}-SO, as observed in some Rh_{2} complexes.

Complexes with the M−O−S arrangement have been observed using the techniques of laser ablation and low temperature spectroscopy.

== Synthesis ==
SO complexes can be prepared from ethylene episulfoxides. This heterocycle binds metals through S, then releases ethylene. Lewis acid adducts of sulfinylamines release SO when heated. In this way [RhCl(SO)(PPh_{3})_{2}]_{2} can be produced from RhCl(PPh_{3})_{3} (Ph = C_{6}H_{5}).

Another approach involves redox reactions of metal sulfides. Some cases involve well-defined oxidants such as peroxides. In other cases, air is assumed to be the oxidant.
