= Lower sulfur oxides =

Group of inorganic compounds

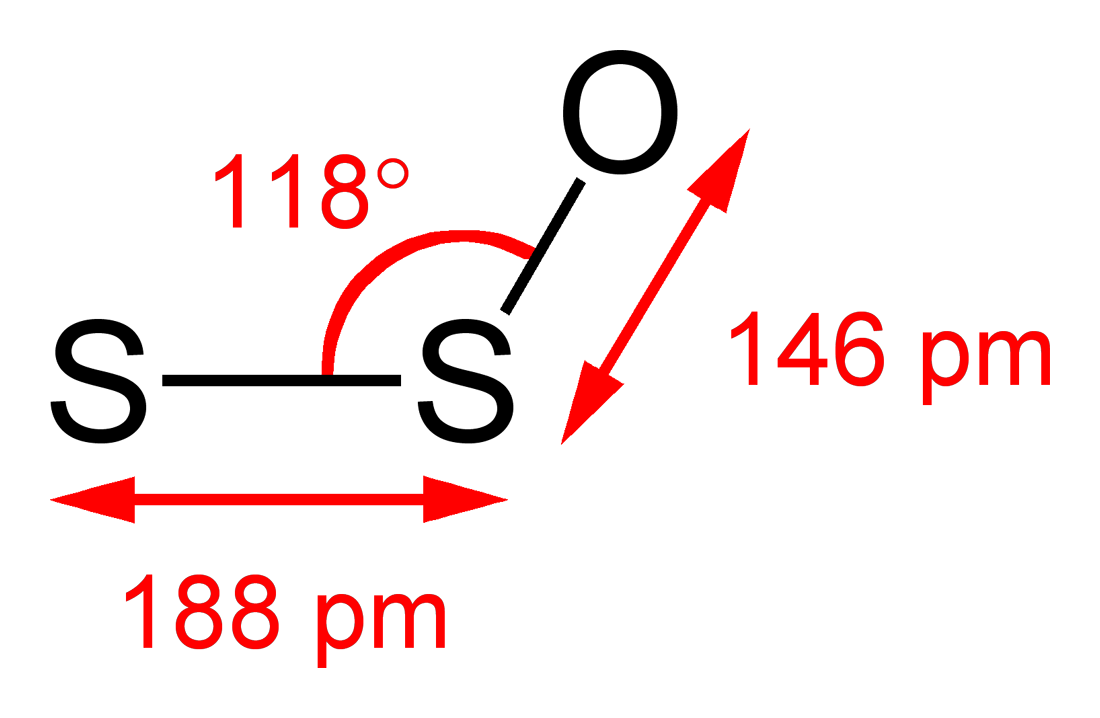
Structure of S_{2}O

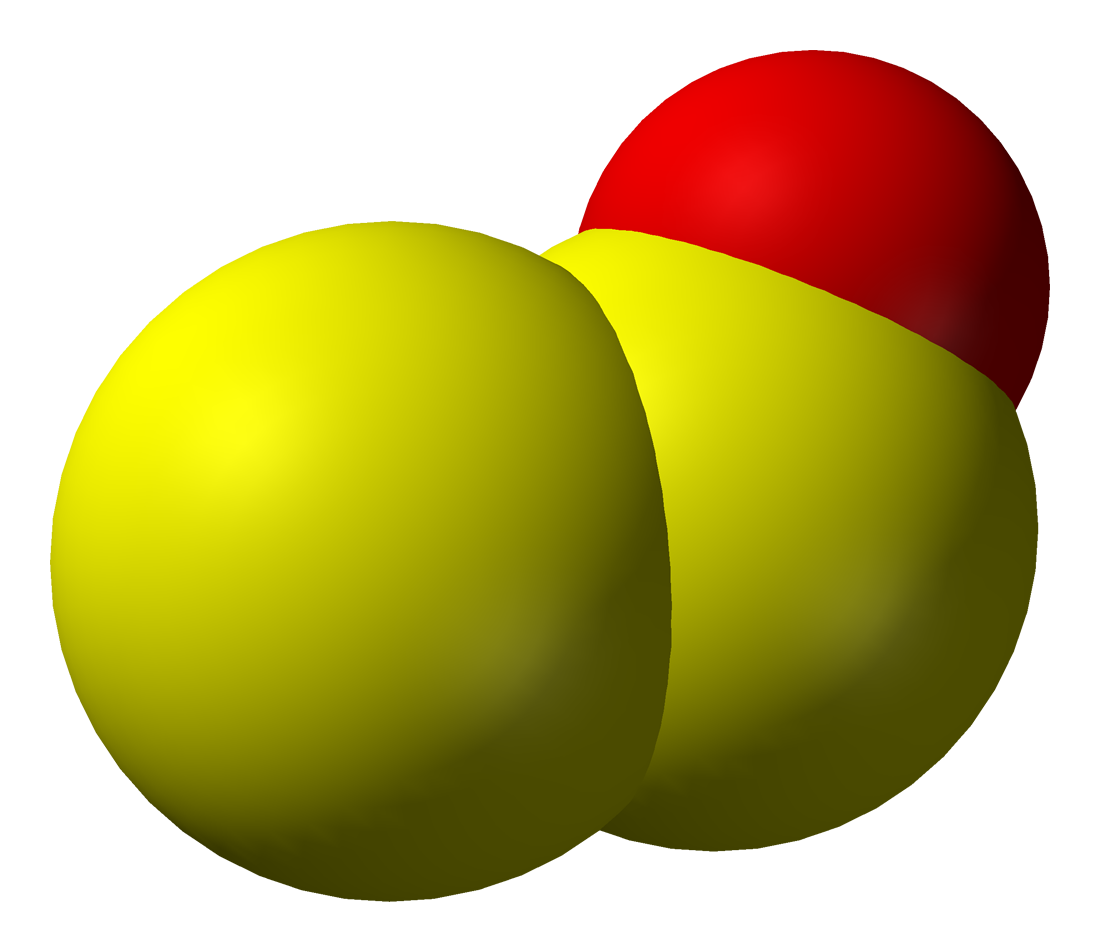
Space-filling model of S_{2}O

When elemental sulfur and sulfur trioxide are exposed to moisture, a bluish-black mixture can be obtained. This mixture was once mistakenly believed to be disulfur trioxide.

The lower sulfur oxides are a group of inorganic compounds with the formula S_{m}O_{n}, where 2m > n. These species are often unstable and thus rarely encountered in everyday life. They are significant intermediates in the combustion of elemental sulfur. Some well characterized examples include sulfur monoxide (SO), its dimer S_{2}O_{2}, and a series of cyclic sulfur oxides, S_{n}O_{x} (x = 1, 2), based on cyclic S_{n} rings.

Interest in the lower sulfur oxides has increased because of the need to understand terrestrial atmospheric sulfur pollution and the finding that the extraterrestrial atmospheres of Io, one of Jupiter's moons, and Venus contain significant amounts of sulfur oxides. Some reports of compounds by early workers are no longer believed to be correct. For example, the blue solution formed by dissolving sulfur in liquid SO_{3}, initially reported to be the sesquioxide S_{2}O_{3} ("disulfur trioxide"), is now believed to be a mixture of polysulfate salts of the sulfur polycations S^{2+}_{4} and S^{2+}_{8}.

== Sulfur monoxide, disulfur dioxide, disulfur monoxide ==
These species are well characterized in the gas phase, but they cannot be isolated as solids or liquids. Instead, when condensed, they undergo dimerization and oligomerization, usually yielding sulfur dioxide and elemental sulfur. At a few millibars pressure, the relative stabilities are S_{2}O > S_{2}O_{2} > SO. Sulfur monoxide (SO) and its dimer (S_{2}O_{2}) have been trapped at low temperature. Disulfur dioxide (S_{2}O_{2}) is a dimer of sulfur monoxide. It has C_{2v} structure (planar).

Disulfur monoxide (S_{2}O) is an analogue of sulfur dioxide. Like SO_{2} as well as ozone (O_{3}), and trisulfur (S_{3}), it adopts a bent structure. The S-S bond length is 188.4 pm, the S-O bond is 146.5 pm and the SSO angle is 117.88°. The two dipole moment components are μ_{a} = 0.875 D and μ_{b} = 1.18 D. This species decomposes to give a polymeric sulfur oxides ("PSO's") with the approximate formula [S_{3}O]_{n}. PSO's decompose at room temperature to elemental sulfur and SO_{2}. PSO's have been proposed to be responsible for the colour of Io.

Trisulfur monoxide, S_{3}O is an unstable molecule. It has been detected in the gas phase using neutralization-reionization mass spectrometry. Both cyclic and chain structures were found.

== Cyclic S_{n}O_{x} (x = 1, 2) ==
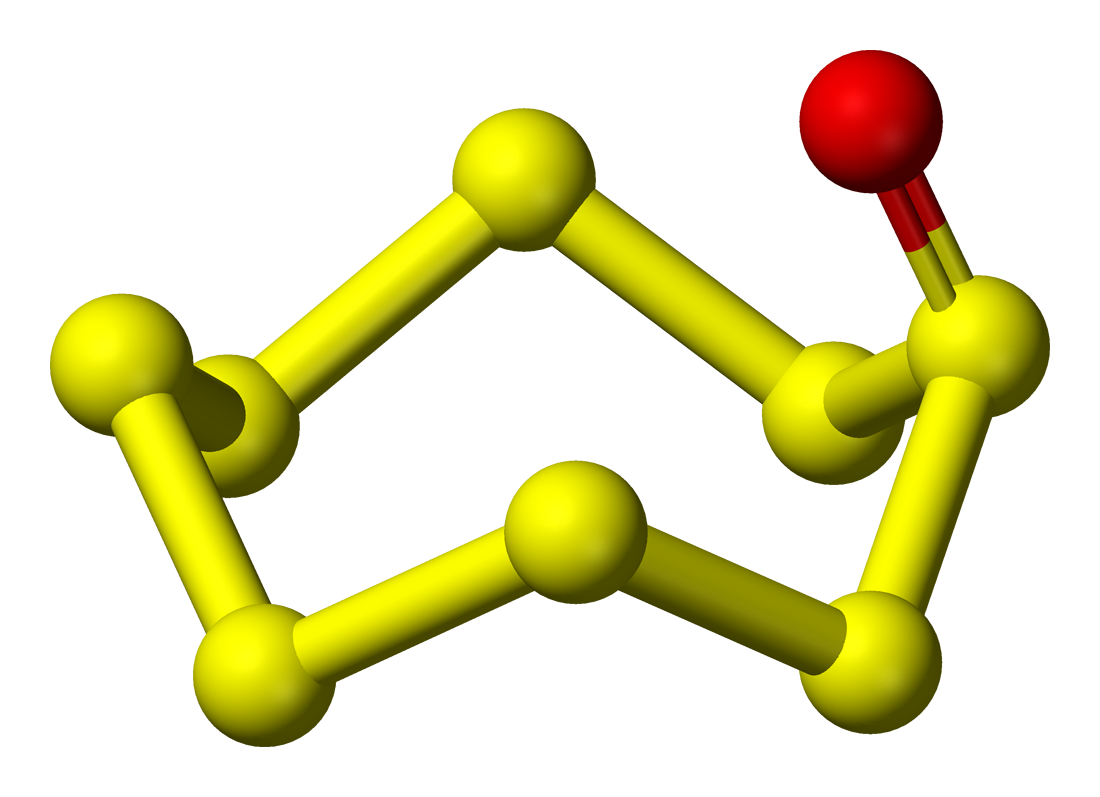
Ball-and-stick model of cyclooctasulfur monoxide, S_{8}O

A number of monoxides S_{n}O are known where n = 5-10. The oxygen atom is exocyclic. They can be prepared by oxidising the homocycles with trifluoroperoxyacetic acid:

S_{n} + CF_{3}C(O)OOH → S_{n}O + CF_{3}C(O)OH

The compounds are yellow or orange-coloured and thermally unstable near room temperature.

formula	color (25 °C)	m.p. (°C)
S_{6}O	yellow	39
S_{7}O	orange	55
S_{7}O_{2}	intense orange	60–62 (decomp.)
S_{8}O	orange	78 (decomposition)
S_{9}O	intensely yellow	32-34
S_{10}O	orange	51 (decomp.)

One dioxide is well characterized: the deep orange S_{7}O_{2} (m.p. 60–62 °C with decomposition), which arises using trifluoroperoxoacetic acid.
