= Metal sulfur dioxide complex =

Chemical compound containing SO2 bound to a transition metal

Metal sulfur dioxide complexes are complexes with sulfur dioxide, SO_{2}, bonded to a transition metal. Such compounds are common but are mainly of theoretical interest. Historically, the study of these compounds has provided insights into the mechanisms of migratory insertion reactions.

== Bonding modes ==
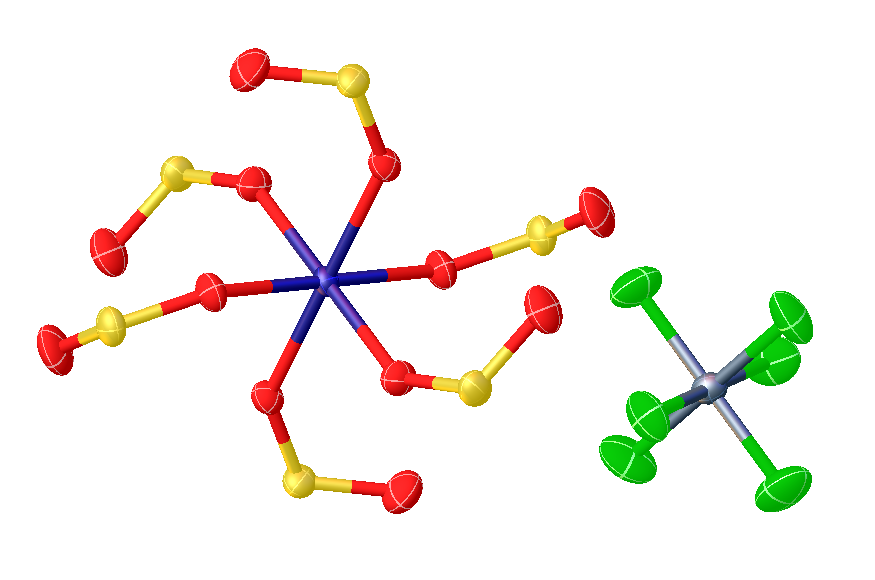
Portion of the structure of [Ni(SO_{2})_{6}](AsF_{6})_{2}, showing the dication and one of two AsF^{−}_{6} anions.

Sulfur dioxide forms complexes with many transition metals. Most numerous are complexes with metals in oxidation state 0 or +1.

In most cases SO_{2} binds in monodentate fashion, attaching to the metal through sulfur. Such complexes are further subdivided according to the planarity or pyramidalization at sulfur. The various bonding modes are:

- η^{1}-SO_{2}, planar (meaning that the MSO_{2} subunit forms a plane). In such complexes, SO_{2} is classified as a 2-electron donor complemented by pi-back bonding into the empty p_{z} orbital localized on sulfur.
- η^{1}-SO_{2}, pyramidal (meaning that the MSO_{2} subunit is pyramidal at sulfur). In such complexes, SO_{2} is classified as a pure Lewis acid. The structure is similar to that for conventional Lewis base adducts of SO_{2}.
- η^{2}-SO_{2}. Both S and one O centre are attached to the metal. The MSO_{2} subunit is pyramidal at sulfur. This bonding mode is more common for early metals, which are typically strongly pi-donating.
- η^{1}-SO_{2}, O-bonded. In such cases, SO_{2} attaches to a metal via one of its two oxygen centres. Such complexes are prevalent for hard metal cations such as Na^{+} and Al^{3+}. In these compounds the M–O interaction is usually weak.

More exotic bonding modes are known for clusters.

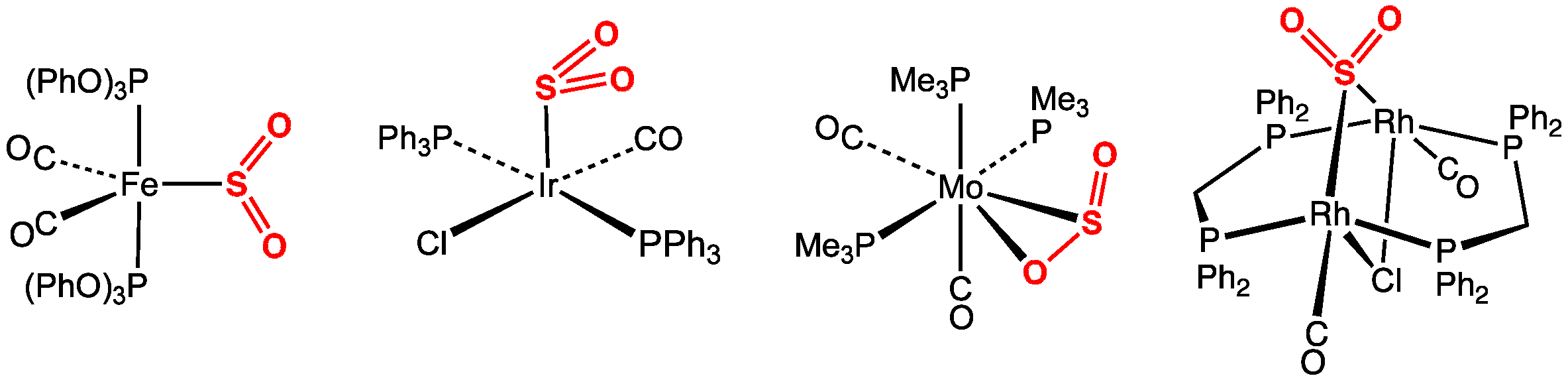
Illustrative SO_{2} complexes of soft metal centers. From the left, Fe(CO)_{2}[P(OPh)_{3}]_{2}(η^{1}-SO_{2}), IrCl(CO)(PPh_{3})_{2}(η^{1}-SO_{2}), Mo(CO)_{2}(PMe_{3})_{3}(η^{2}-SO_{2}), and the A-frame complex Rh_{2}(bis(diphenylphosphino)methane)_{2}Cl(CO)_{2}(μ-SO_{2}).

== Preparation ==
Complexes of the transition metals are usually generated simply by treating the appropriate metal complex with SO_{2}. The adducts are often weak. In some cases, SO_{2} displaces other ligands.

A large number of labile O-bonded SO_{2} complexes arise from the oxidation of a suspension of the metals in liquid SO_{2}, an excellent solvent.

== Reactions ==
The main practical reaction of sulfur dioxide promoted by transition metals is its reduction by hydrogen sulfide. Known as the Claus process, this reaction is conducted on a large scale using vanadium oxide catalysts as a way to remove hydrogen sulfide that arises in hydrotreating processes in refineries. The detailed mechanism is obscure.

Some sulfur dioxide complexes hydrolyze to give sulfito complexes:

[Ru(NH_{3})_{4}(OH_{2})(SO_{2})]^{2+} + OH^{−} ⇌ [Ru(NH_{3})_{4}(OH_{2})(SO_{3}H)]^{+}

=== Insertion of SO_{2} into metal-ligand bonds ===
Of academic interest, SO_{2} acts like a Lewis acid towards the alkyl ligand. The pathway for the insertion of SO_{2} into metal alkyl bond begins with attack of the alkyl nucleophile on the sulfur centre in SO_{2}. The "insertion" proceed the sulfur dioxide between the metal and the alkyl ligand leads to the O,O′-sulphinate. Alternatively an O-sulphinate can arise. Both of these intermediates commonly convert to an S-sulphinate. The S-sulphinate has sulfur–oxygen stretching frequencies from 1250–1000 cm^{−1} and 1100–1000 cm^{−1}. The O,O′-sulphinate and O-sulphinate are difficult to distinguish as they have stretching frequencies from 1085–1050 cm^{−1} and 1000–820 cm^{−1} or lower. The pathway involving the O,O′-sulphinate can generally be ruled out if the original metal complex fulfilled the 18-electron rule because the two metal–oxygen bonds would exceed the 18 electron rule. The pathway by which SO_{2} inserts into a square planar alkyl complexes involves the formation of an adduct. Thereafter, the alkyl ligand migrates to the SO_{2}.

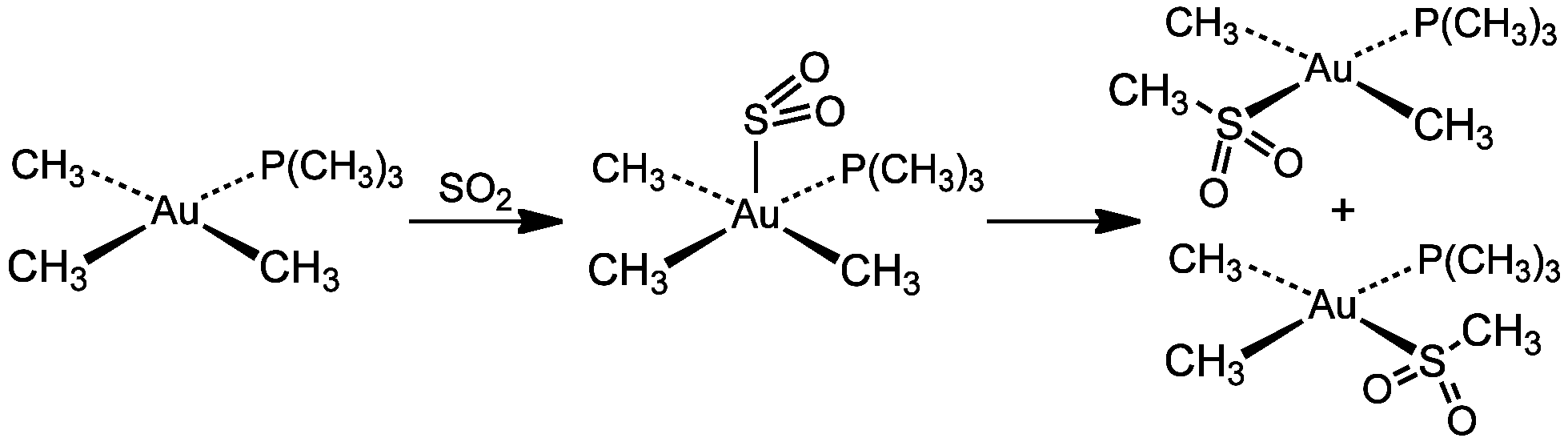
Pathway for insertion of SO_{2} into Au-methyl bonds of a square planar Au(III)) complex.

== Related complexes ==
=== Dithionite complexes ===
Dithionite, the reductively coupled derivative of sulfur dioxide is observed as a ligand when some reduced metals are treated with sulfur dithioxide. One example is [(C_{5}(CH_{3})_{5})_{2}Sm]_{2}(S_{2}O_{4}).

=== S_{2}O complexes ===
Several complexes of disulfur monoxide are known. Most are formed by oxidation peroxide oxidation of a disulfur ligand. In these complexes, the S_{2}O ligand is invariably bound in an η^{2}-S,S manner. Selected examples: [Ir(dppe)_{2}S_{2}O]^{+}, OsCl(NO)(PPh_{3})_{2}S_{2}O, NbCl(η-C_{5}H_{5})_{2}S_{2}O, Mn(CO)_{2}(η-C_{5}Me_{5})S_{2}O, Re(CO)_{2}(η-C_{5}Me_{5})S_{2}O, Re(CO)_{2}(η-C_{5}H_{5})S_{2}O.

Mo_{2}(S_{2}O)_{2}(S_{2}CNEt_{2})_{4} arises when the dithiocarbamate complex Mo(CO)_{2}(S_{2}CNEt_{2})_{2} is oxidized with elemental sulfur in air. Another way to form these complexes is to combine OSNSO_{2}·R complexes with hydrogen sulfide. Complexes formed in this way are: IrCl(CO)(PPh_{3})_{2}S_{2}O; Mn(CO)_{2}(η-C_{5}H_{5})S_{2}O. With hydrosulfide and a base followed by oxygen, OsCl(NO)(PPh_{3})_{2}S_{2}O can be made.
