= Selenium hexasulfide =

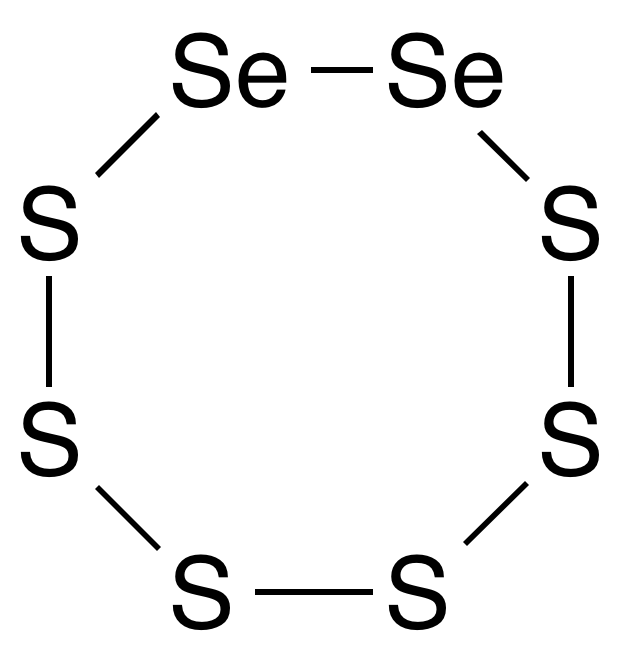
1,2-Selenium
hexasulfide
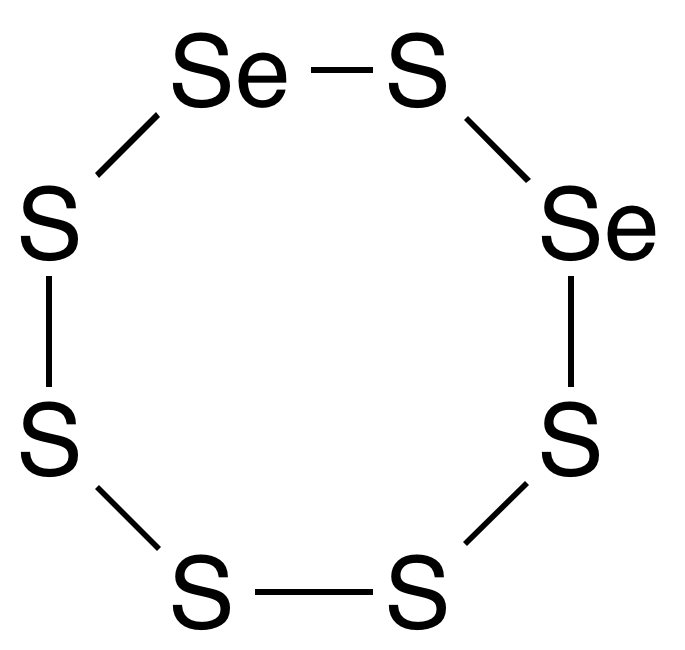
1,3-Selenium
hexasulfide
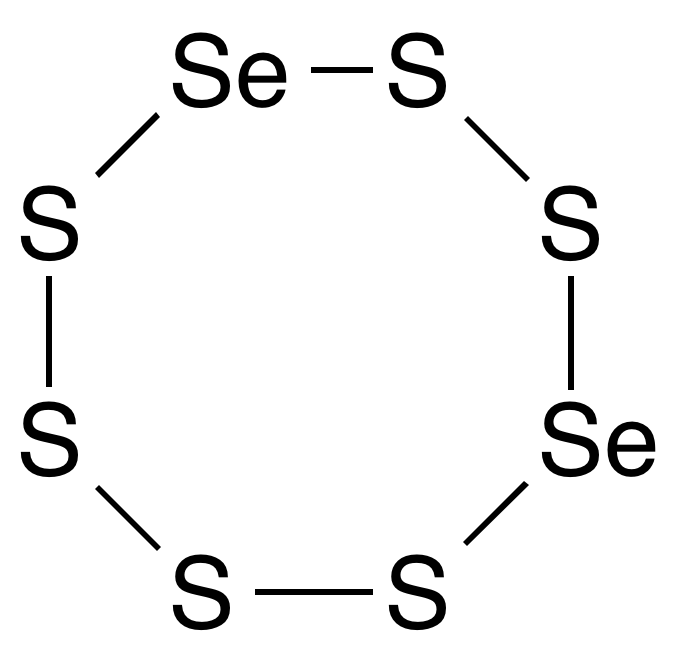
1,4-Selenium
hexasulfide
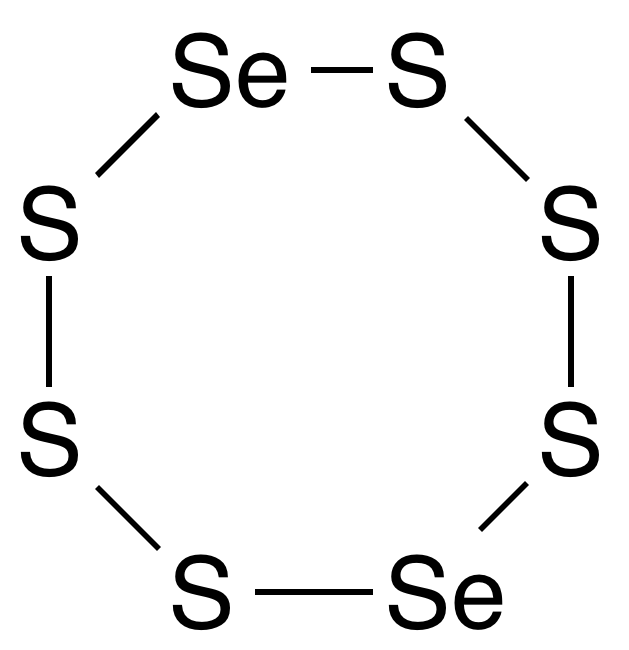
1,5-Selenium
hexasulfide

Names
- Other names: Diselenacyclooctasulfane; Diselenaoctathiocane; Diselenium hexasulfide

Identifiers
CAS Number	75926-26-0
3D model (JSmol)	1,2: Interactive image; 1,5: Interactive image
ChemSpider	1,2: 9296780; 1,5: 9057901
PubChem CID	1,2: 11121651; 1,5: 10882632
- InChI: 1,2: InChI=1S/S6Se2/c1-2-4-6-8-7-5-3-1 Key: GVMSZJKNEHYJTG-UHFFFAOYSA-N; 1,5: InChI=1S/S6Se2/c1-3-7-5-2-6-8-4-1 Key: XHXZYRZXIYIDIG-UHFFFAOYSA-N
- SMILES: 1,2: S1SSS[Se][Se]SS1; 1,5: S1S[Se]SSS[Se]S1

Properties
Chemical formula	Se_{2}S_{6}
Molar mass	350.30 g·mol^{−1}
Appearance	orange needles
Density	2.44 g/cm^{3}
Melting point	121.5 °C (250.7 °F; 394.6 K)
Solubility	soluble in carbon disulfide
- Except where otherwise noted, data are given for materials in their standard state (at 25 °C [77 °F], 100 kPa). verify (what is ?) Infobox references

Selenium hexasulfide is a chemical compound with the chemical formula Se_{2}S_{6}. Its molecular structure is an 8-membered ring, consisting of two selenium and six sulfur atoms (diselenacyclooctasulfane), analogous to the S_{8} ring, an allotrope of sulfur (cyclooctasulfur or cyclooctasulfane), and other 8-membered rings of selenium sulfides with formula Se_{n}S_{8−n}.

There are several isomers depending on the relative placement of the selenium atoms in the ring: 1,2-diselenacyclooctasulfane (with the two Se atoms adjacent), 1,3-diselenacyclooctasulfane, 1,4-diselenacyclooctasulfane, and 1,5-diselenacyclooctasulfane (with the Se atoms opposite). It is an oxidizing agent.

The 1,2 isomer can be prepared by reaction of chlorosulfanes and dichlorodiselane with potassium iodide in carbon disulfide. The reaction produces also cyclooctaselenium Se_{8} and all other eight-member cyclic selenium sulfides, except selenacyclooctasulfane SeS_{7}, and several six- and seven-membered rings.
