= Hexasulfur =

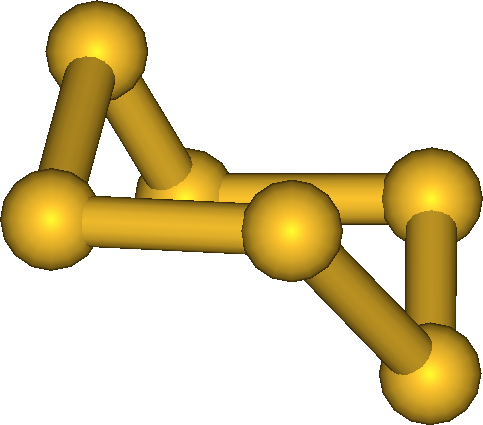
- Ball and stick model of hexathiane

Names
- Systematic IUPAC name: Cyclohexasulfane; cyclo-Hexasulfur; Hexathiane
- Other names Hexasulfur

Identifiers
CAS Number	13798-23-7
3D model (JSmol)	Interactive image
ChemSpider	123119
PubChem CID	139602
CompTox Dashboard (EPA)	DTXSID00893333
- InChI: InChI=1S/S6/c1-2-4-6-5-3-1 Key: FEXCMMPRRBSCRG-UHFFFAOYSA-N
- SMILES: S1SSSSS1

Properties
Chemical formula	S_{6}
Molar mass	192.36 g·mol^{−1}
Appearance	Vivid, orange, opaque crystals

Related compounds
Related compounds	Octasulfur
- Except where otherwise noted, data are given for materials in their standard state (at 25 °C [77 °F], 100 kPa). Infobox references

Hexasulfur is an inorganic chemical with the chemical formula S_{6}. This allotrope of sulfur was first prepared by M. R. Engel in 1891 by treating thiosulfate with HCl. Hexasulfur is orange-red and forms a rhombohedral crystal. It is also called cyclo-S_{6}, ρ-sulfur, ε-sulfur, Engel's sulfur, and Aten's sulfur.

== Nomenclature ==
The most common name for the compound is "hexasulfur".

The preferred IUPAC name, cyclohexasulfane, is constructed according to compositional nomenclature.

Hexasulfur is the final member of the thiane heterocyclic series, in which every carbon atom is substituted with a sulfur atom, giving the systematic name "hexathiane", a valid IUPAC name using substitutive nomenclature.

Another valid IUPAC systematic name, cyclo-hexasulfur, is constructed using additive nomenclature.

== Structure ==
Hexasulfur consists of rings of six sulfur atoms. It is thus a simple cyclosulfane and an allotrope of sulfur. Hexasulfur adopts a chair configuration similar to that of cyclohexane, with bond angles of 102.2°. The sulfur atoms are equivalent.

== Preparation ==
A method of preparation involves the reaction of a polysulfane with sulfur monochloride:

H_{2}S_{4} + S_{2}Cl_{2} → cyclo-S_{6} + 2 HCl (dilute solution in diethyl ether)
