= Heptasulfur imide =

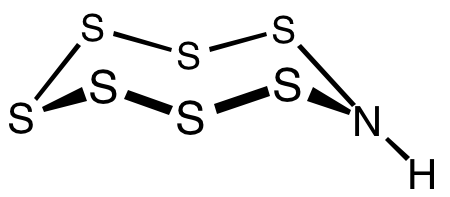

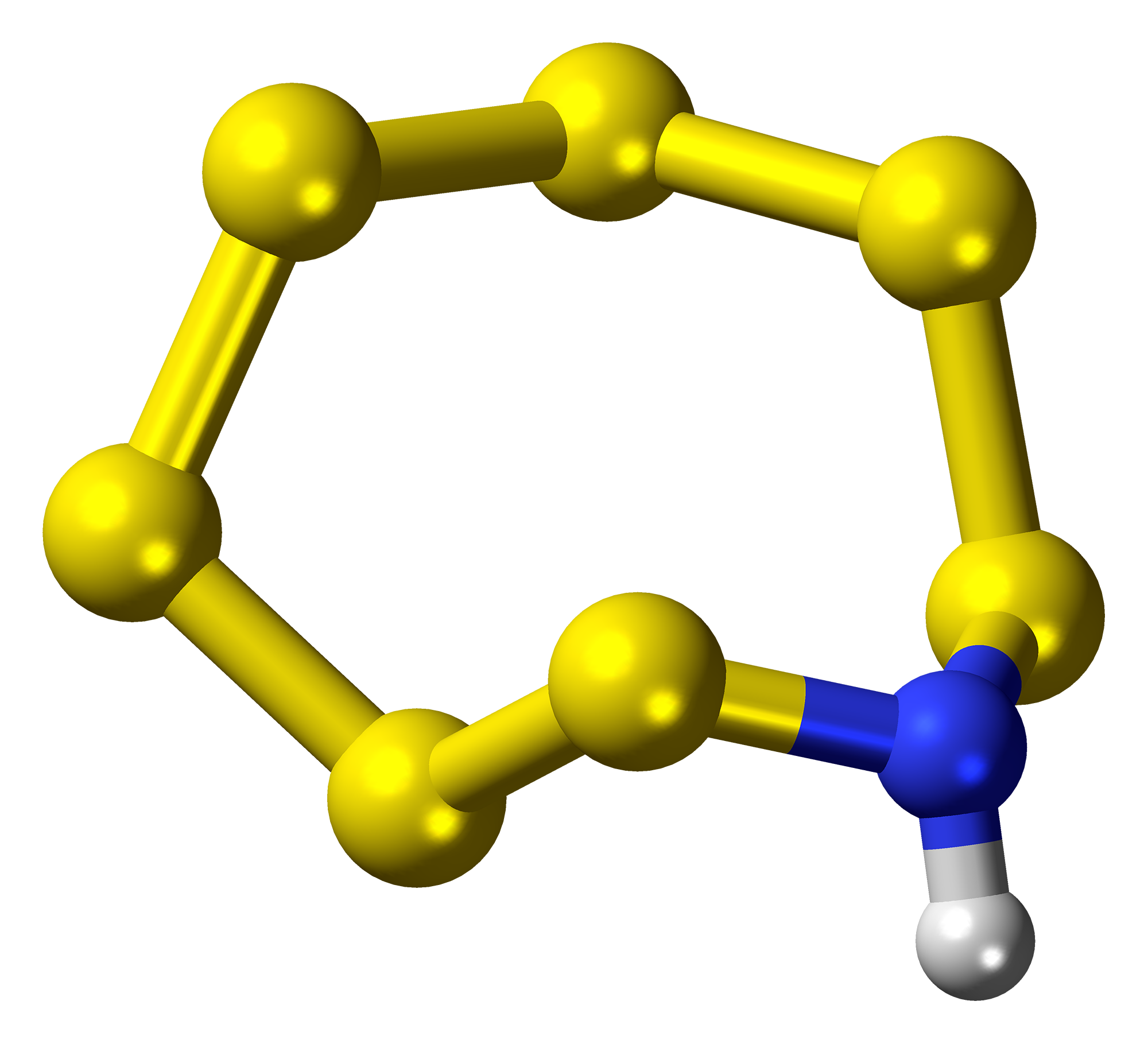

Names
- IUPAC name Heptathiazocane
- Other names: Azacyclooctasulfane; Heptasulfur imide

Identifiers
CAS Number	293-42-5
3D model (JSmol)	Interactive image
ChemSpider	2689062
PubChem CID	3446506
CompTox Dashboard (EPA)	DTXSID70392545
- InChI: InChI=1S/HNS7/c1-2-4-6-8-7-5-3-1/h1H Key: NLDXLSSPVWXKBF-UHFFFAOYSA-N
- SMILES: N1SSSSSSS1

Properties
Chemical formula	S_{7}NH
Molar mass	239.44 g·mol^{−1}
Appearance	Pale yellow solid
Density	2.01 g/cm^{3}
Melting point	113.5 °C (236.3 °F; 386.6 K)

Related compounds
Related compounds	Octasulfur monoxide; Octasulfur
- Except where otherwise noted, data are given for materials in their standard state (at 25 °C [77 °F], 100 kPa). Infobox references

Heptasulfur imide is the inorganic compound with the formula S_{7}NH. It is a pale yellow solid that is, like elemental sulfur, highly soluble in carbon disulfide. The compound, which is only of academic interest, is representative of a family of sulfur imides (or azacyclosulfanes or thiacycloazanes) S_{x}(NH)_{y}.

== Synthesis and structure ==
It is prepared by reaction of disulfur dichloride with ammonia, although other methods have been developed. Together with S_{7}NH, the reaction also produces three isomers (1,3-S_{6}(NH)_{2}, 1,4-S_{6}(NH)_{2} and 1,5-S_{6}(NH)_{2}) of S_{6}(NH)_{2} (diazacyclooctasulfanes) and two isomers (1,3,5-S_{5}(NH)_{3} and 1,3,6-S_{5}(NH)_{3}) of S_{5}(NH)_{3} (triazacyclooctasulfanes).

Azacyclooctasulfane is an analogue of octasulfur (cyclooctasulfane) S_{8}, with one −S− replaced by −NH−. The S−NH−S center is almost planar, suggesting that the amine is nonbasic.
