= Disulfur dioxide =

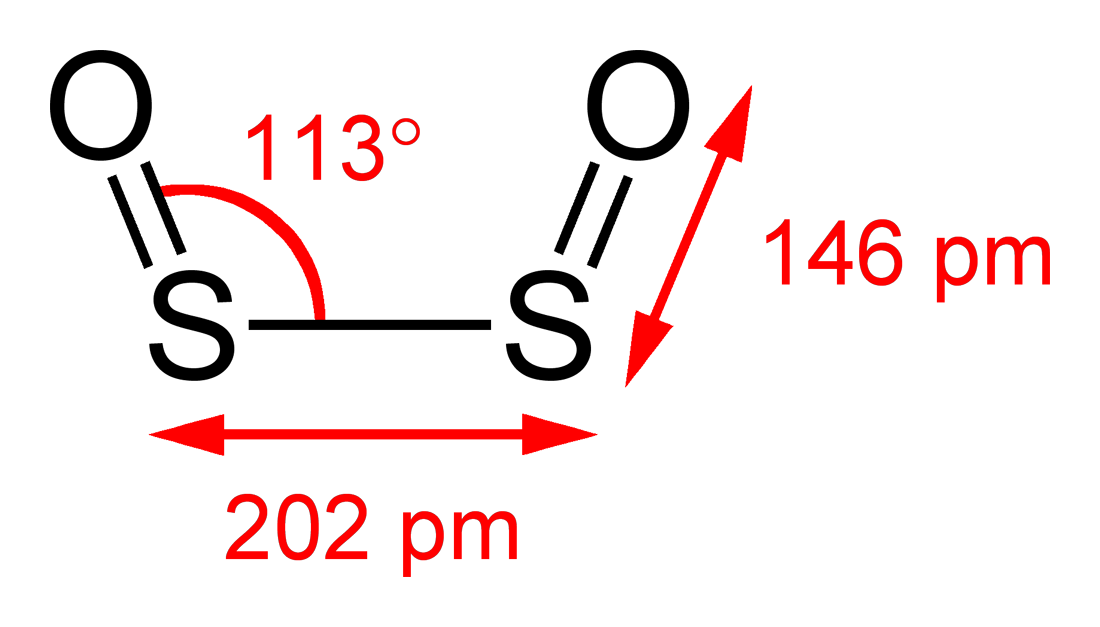
- structure of disulfur dioxide, S_{2}O_{2}

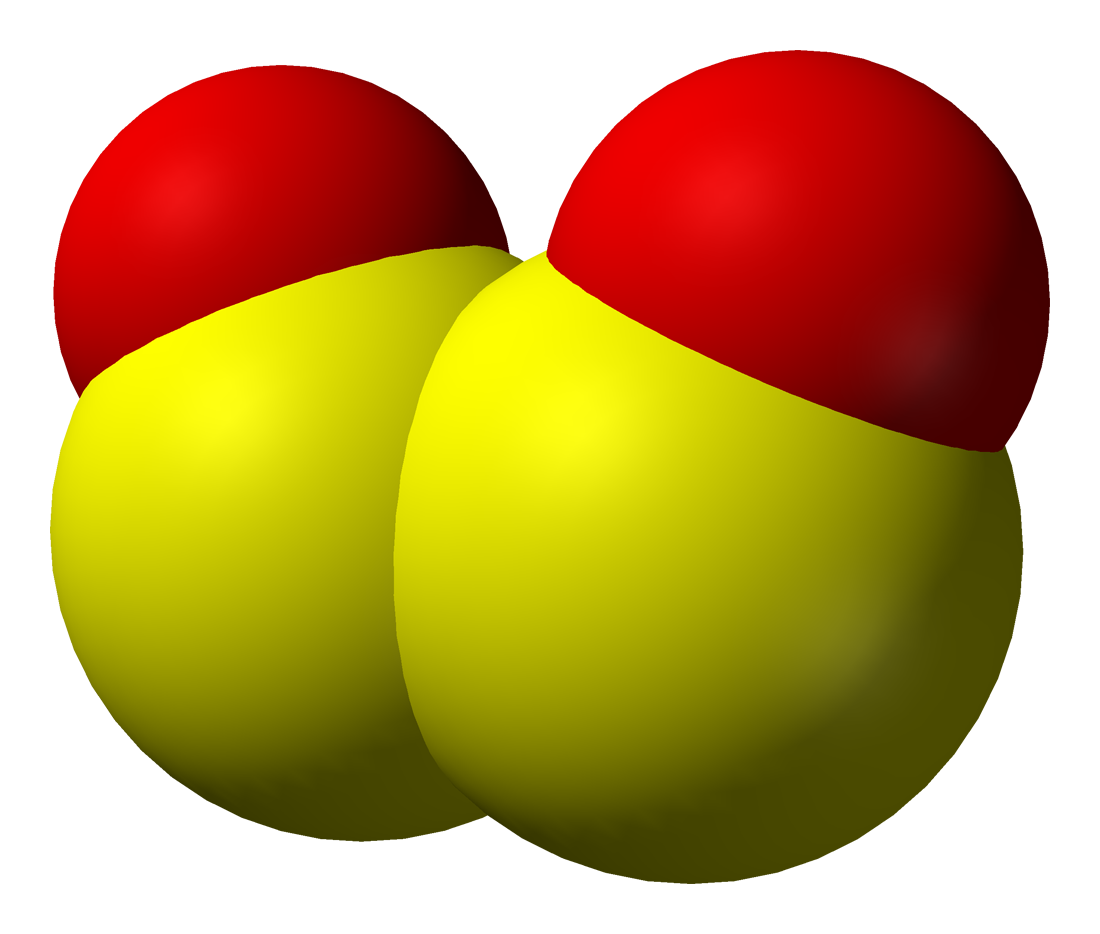
- space-filling model of the disulfur dioxide molecule

Names
- Other names disulfur(II)oxide; SO dimer

Identifiers
CAS Number	126885-21-0
3D model (JSmol)	Interactive image
PubChem CID	145835224
- InChI: InChI=1/O2S2/c1-3-4-2 Key: AXYLJRYHRATPSG-UHFFFAOYNA-N
- SMILES: O=[S][S]=O

Properties
Chemical formula	S_{2}O_{2}
Molar mass	96.1299 g/mol
Appearance	gas

Structure
Coordination geometry	bent

Hazards
- Occupational safety and health (OHS/OSH)
Main hazards	toxic

Related compounds
Related compounds	tetrasulfur SO, S_{3}O; S_{2}O
- Except where otherwise noted, data are given for materials in their standard state (at 25 °C [77 °F], 100 kPa). Infobox references

Disulfur dioxide, dimeric sulfur monoxide or SO dimer is an oxide of sulfur with the formula S_{2}O_{2}. The solid is unstable with a lifetime of a few seconds at room temperature.

== Structure ==
Disulfur dioxide adopts a cis planar structure with C_{2v} symmetry. The S−O bond length is 145.8 pm, shorter than in sulfur monoxide. The S−S bond length is 202.45 pm and the O−S−S angle is 112.7°. S_{2}O_{2} has a dipole moment of 3.17 D. It is an asymmetric top molecule.

The electronic ground state is a singlet, unlike disulfur or dioxygen.

== Formation ==
Sulfur monoxide (SO) converts to disulfur dioxide (S_{2}O_{2}) spontaneously and reversibly. So the substance can be generated by methods that produce sulfur monoxide. Disulfur dioxide has also been formed by an electric discharge in sulfur dioxide. Another laboratory procedure is to react oxygen atoms with carbonyl sulfide or carbon disulfide vapour.

Although most forms of elemental sulfur (S_{8} and other rings and chains) do not combine with SO_{2}, atomic sulfur does so to form sulfur monoxide, which dimerizes:

S + SO_{2} → S_{2}O_{2} ⇌ 2 SO

Disulfur dioxide is also produced upon a microwave discharge in sulfur dioxide diluted in helium. At a pressure of 0.1 mmHg (13 Pa), five percent of the result is S_{2}O_{2}.

Disulfur dioxide is formed transiently when hydrogen sulfide and oxygen undergo flash photolysis.

A branched isomer valence isoelectronic to SO_{3}, S=SO_{2}, is believed to form during the thermal decomposition of cyclic vicinal alkyl thiosulfites.

== Properties ==
The ionization energy of disulfur dioxide is 9.93±0.02 eV.

Disulfur dioxide absorbs at 320–400 nm, as observed of the Venusian atmosphere, and is believed to have contributed to the greenhouse effect on that planet.

== Reactions and decomposition ==
Although disulfur dioxide exists in equilibrium with sulfur monoxide, it also reacts with sulfur monoxide to form sulfur dioxide and disulfur monoxide.

Decomposition of S_{2}O_{2} proceeds via the following disproportionation reaction:

S_{2}O_{2} → SO_{2} + 1/_{8} S_{8}

== Complexes ==
S_{2}O_{2} can be a ligand with transition metals. It binds in the η^{2}-S–S position with both sulfur atoms linked to the metal atom. This was first shown in 2003. The bis(trimethylphosphine) thiirane S-oxide complex of platinum, when heated in toluene at 110 °C loses ethylene, and forms a complex with S_{2}O_{2}: (Ph_{3}P)_{2}Pt(S_{2}O_{2}). Iridium atoms can also form a complex: cis-[(dppe)_{2}IrS_{2}]Cl with sodium periodate oxidizes to [(dppe)_{2}IrS_{2}O] and then to [(dppe)_{2}IrS_{2}O_{2}], with dppe being 1,2-bis(diphenylphosphino)ethane. This substance has the S_{2}O_{2} in a cis position. The same conditions can make a trans complex, but this contains two separate SO radicals instead. The iridium complex can be decomposed with triphenylphosphine to form triphenylphosphine oxide and triphenylphosphine sulfide.

== Anion ==
The S_{2}O^{−}_{2} radical anion has been observed in the gas phase. It may adopt a trigonal shape akin to SO_{3}.

== Spectrum ==
=== Microwave ===
Transition	Frequency (MHz)
2_{1,1}−2_{0,2}	11013.840
4_{1,3}−4_{0,4}	14081.640
1_{1,1}−0_{0,0}	15717.946
4_{0,4}−3_{1,3}	16714.167
3_{1,3}−2_{0,2}	26342.817
4_{2,2}−4_{1,3}	26553.915
2_{2,0}−2_{1,1}	28493.046
6_{0,6}−5_{1,5}	30629.283
5_{2,4}−5_{1,5}	35295.199
5_{1,5}−4_{0,4}	35794.527

== In the Solar System ==
There is some evidence that disulfur dioxide may be a small component in the atmosphere of Venus, and that it may substantially contribute of the planet's severe greenhouse effect. It is not found in any substantive quantity in Earth's atmosphere.
