= Octasulfur monoxide =

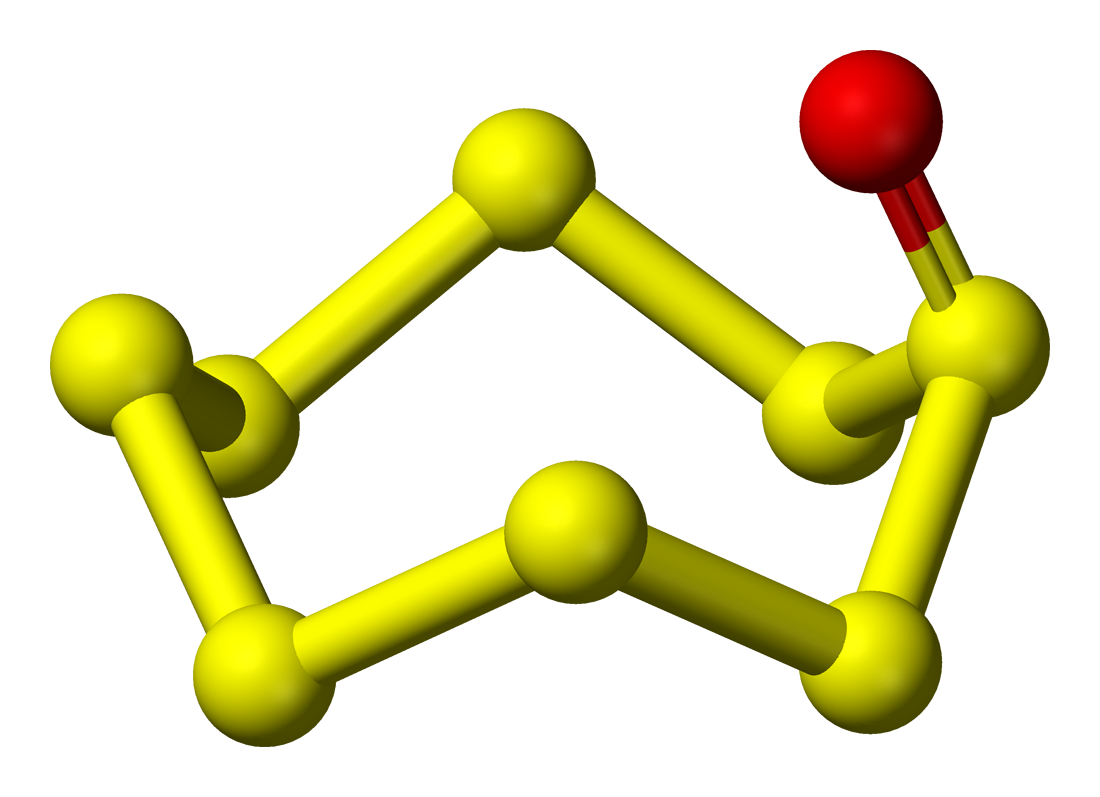

Names
- Other names: Cyclooctasulfane oxide; Octathiocane oxide

Identifiers
CAS Number	35788-51-3
3D model (JSmol)	Interactive image
ChemSpider	30654016
PubChem CID	139186352
- InChI: InChI=1S/OS8/c1-9-7-5-3-2-4-6-8-9 Key: ZNJJQQGMZXVPNK-UHFFFAOYSA-N
- SMILES: O=S1SSSSSSS1

Properties
Chemical formula	S_{8}O
Molar mass	272.48 g·mol^{−1}
Appearance	Yellowish sharp crystal
Density	2.13 g·cm^{−3}
Solubility	0.8 g（carbon disulfide)

Structure
Crystal structure	Orthorhombic
Space group	Pca2_{1}
Lattice constant	a = 13.197, b = 7.973, c = 8.096

Related compounds
Related compounds	Heptasulfur imide; Octasulfur
- Except where otherwise noted, data are given for materials in their standard state (at 25 °C [77 °F], 100 kPa). Infobox references

Octasulfur monoxide is an inorganic compound with a chemical formula S_{8}O, discovered in 1972. It is a type of sulfur oxide.

A crystalline compound composed of cyclooctasulfur monoxide and antimony pentachloride in equimolar quantities can be made (S_{8}O·SbCl_{5}).
