= Transition metal sulfito complex =

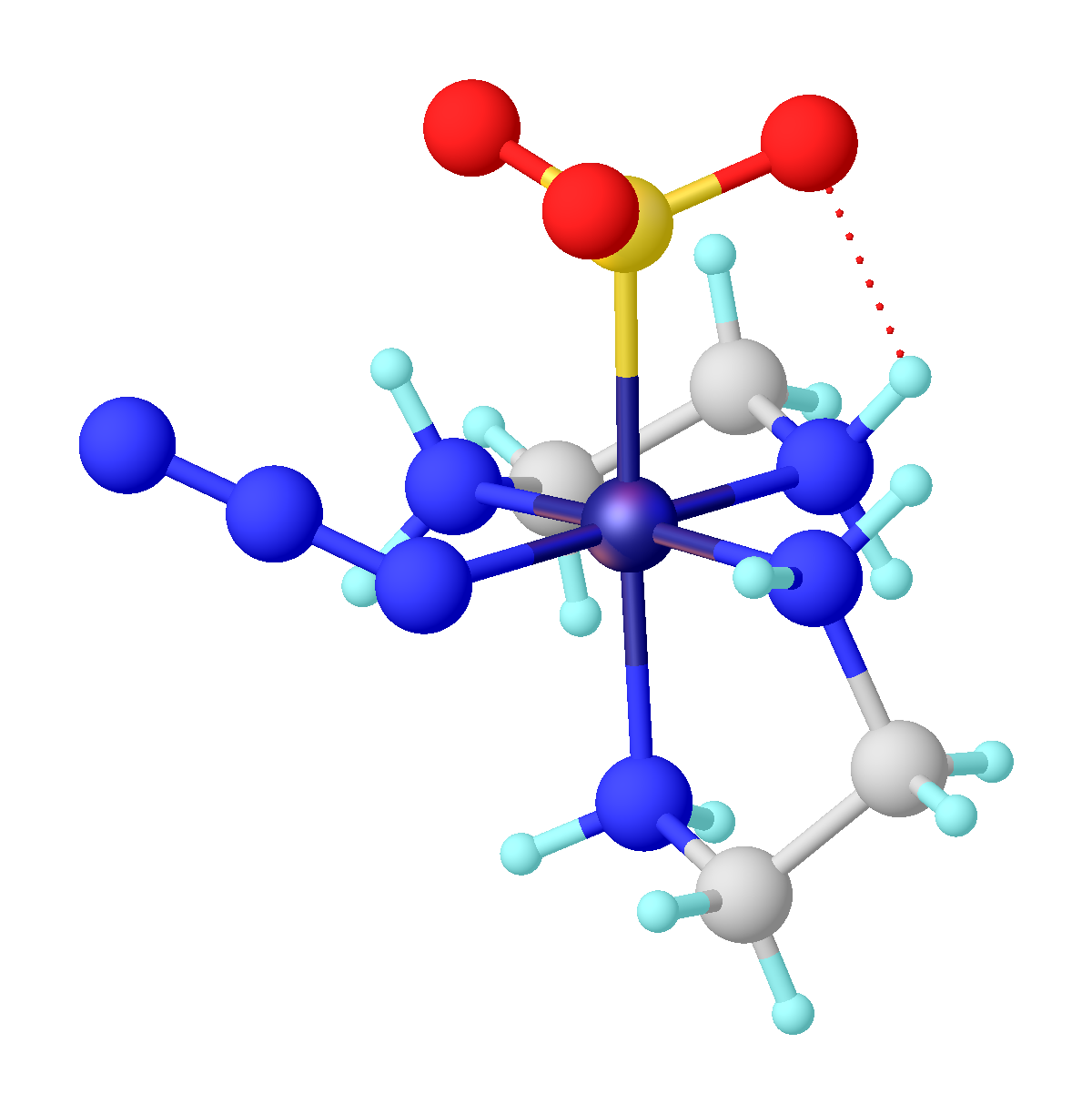
The structure of [Co(ethylenediamine)_{2}(SO_{3})N_{3}]. Color code: blue = N, red = O, yellow = S.

Transition metal sulfito complexes are coordination compounds containing sulfite (SO^{2−}_{3}) as a ligand. Many examples have been characterized. Few sulfito complexes have commercial applications, but sulfite is a substrate for the molybdoenzyme sulfite oxidase.

== Bonding modes ==
In principle, sulfite can bond to metal ions via S or O. To some extent, the sulfito ligand resembles nitrito (NO^{−}_{2}), which can bind through N or O. Monodentate, S-bonded sulfites are more common than O-bonded sulfito ligands. S-bonded sulfite is a soft ligand with a strongly trans labilizing effect as indicated by the rapid aquation of [Co(SO_{3})(NH_{3})_{5}]^{+} to give [Co(SO_{3})(NH_{3})_{4}(H_{2}O)]^{+}.

Sulfite can function as a bridging ligand. One example is Pt_{2}(en)_{2}(μ−^{−}SO_{3})_{2} (en = ethylenediamine)

In some cases, sulfite simply serves as an anion. An example is the hexaaquo complex [Ni(H_{2}O)_{6}]SO_{3}.

== Preparation ==
Sulfito complexes are typically prepared by substitution of metal complexes with sodium sulfite. The method is illustrated by the syntheses of the octahedral rhodium(III) and cobalt(III) complexes [M(SO_{3})_{2}(en)_{2}]^{−} (M = Rh, Co), (where en = ethylenediamine). Some metal-sulfur dioxide complexes react with aqueous base to give sulfito derivatives:

[Ru(NH_{3})_{4}(OH_{2})(SO_{2})]^{2+} + OH^{−} ⇌ [Ru(NH_{3})_{4}(OH_{2})(SO_{3}H)]^{+}

== Examples ==
- [Co(tetren)SO_{3}]^{+}, octahedral cobalt(III) bound also to a pentadentate amine (tetren = HN(CH_{2}CH_{2}NHCH_{2}CH_{2}NH_{2})_{2})
- [Pd(en)(SO_{3})_{2}]^{2−}, square planar palladium(II)
- [Au(en)(SO_{3})_{2}]^{−}, square planar gold(III)
- [Pt_{3}S_{2}(SO_{3})_{6}]^{10−}, illustrating a rare anion with a –10 charge consisting of three square planar platinum(II) centers
- [Co(NH_{3})_{5}SO_{3}]^{+}Cl^{−} where the Co-N bond trans to S is 205.5 pm in length, and Co-N bonds cis to S are 196 pm, ca. 5% shorter. This difference illustrates the high trans influence exerted by the sulfito ligand.

== Complexes with modified sulfito ligands ==
Structure of [PtCl_{2}(SO_{3}H)(SO_{3})]^{3−}

Being dibasic, sulfito ligands are susceptible to O-alkylation and O-protonation. Some examples of such complexes:

- Ru(phen)_{2}(SO_{3}H)_{2}
- Pt[P(C_{6}H_{5})_{3}]_{2}(SO_{2}(OCH_{3}))_{2}
- [PtCl_{2}(SO_{3}H)(SO_{3})]^{3−}
