= Octasulfur =

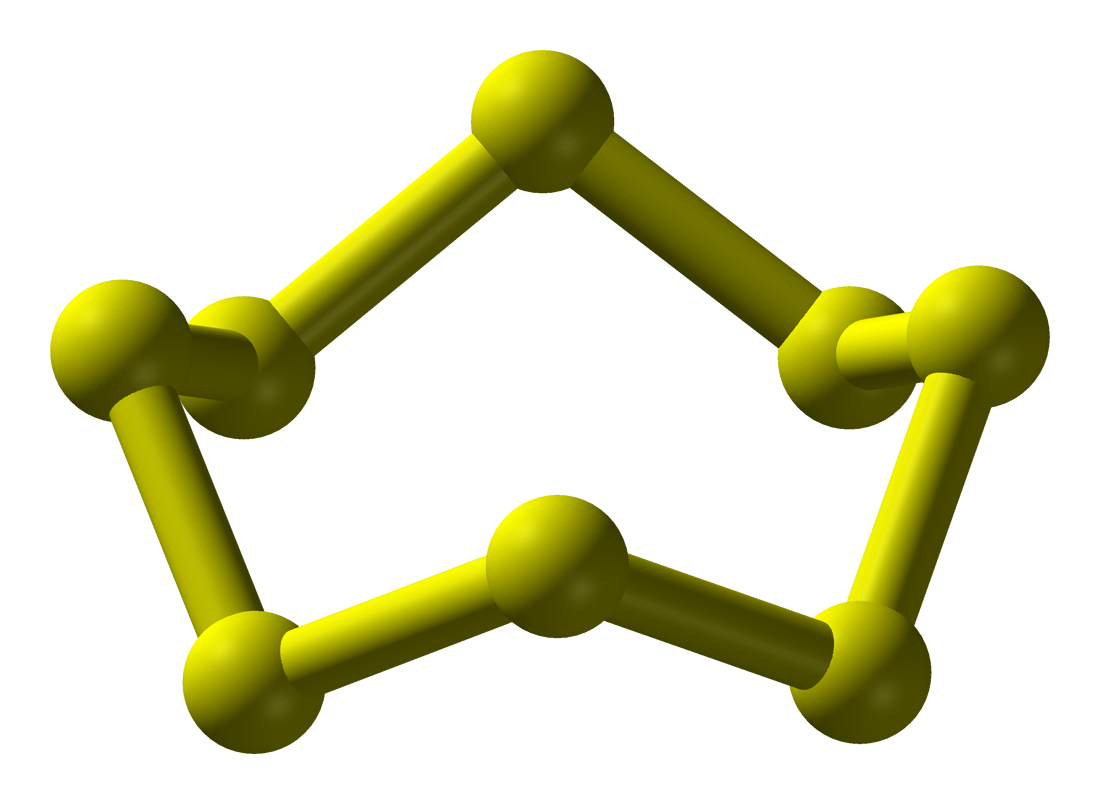
- Ball and stick model of octathiocane

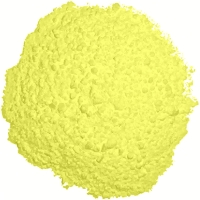
- Sample of pulverised octasulfur

Names
- Systematic IUPAC name: cyclo-Octasulfur; Octathiocane; Cyclooctasulfane
- Other names Octasulfur

Identifiers
CAS Number	10544-50-0
3D model (JSmol)	Interactive image
ChEBI	CHEBI:29385
ChEMBL	ChEMBL1235452
ChemSpider	59726
Gmelin Reference	2973
MeSH	Cyclooctasulfur
PubChem CID	66348
UNII	70FD1KFU70
CompTox Dashboard (EPA)	DTXSID80872924
- InChI: InChI=1S/S8/c1-2-4-6-8-7-5-3-1 Key: JLQNHALFVCURHW-UHFFFAOYSA-N
- SMILES: S1SSSSSSS1

Properties
Chemical formula	S_{8}
Molar mass	256.48 g·mol^{−1}
Appearance	Vivid, yellow, translucent crystals
Density	2.07 g/cm^{3}
Melting point	119 °C; 246 °F; 392 K
Boiling point	444.6 °C; 832.4 °F; 717.8 K
log P	6.117

Thermochemistry
Std molar entropy (S^{⦵}_{298})	32 J·mol^{−1}·K^{−1}
Std enthalpy of formation (Δ_{f}H^{⦵}_{298})	0 kJ/mol

Related compounds
Related compounds	Hexathiane; Octasulfur monoxide; Heptasulfur imide; Selenium hexasulfide
- Except where otherwise noted, data are given for materials in their standard state (at 25 °C [77 °F], 100 kPa). Infobox references

Octasulfur is an inorganic substance with the chemical formula S_{8}. It is an odourless and tasteless yellow solid. It is a major industrial chemical. It is the most common allotrope of sulfur and occurs widely in nature.

== Nomenclature ==
The name octasulfur is commonly used for this chemical. It is systematically named cyclo-octasulfur (which is the preferred IUPAC name) and cyclooctasulfane. It is also the final member of the thiocane heterocylic series, where every carbon atom is substituted with a sulfur atom, thus this sulfur allotrope is systematically named octathiocane as well.

== Structure ==
The compound consists of rings of 8 sulfur atoms. It adopts a crown conformation with D_{4d} point group symmetry. The S–S bond lengths are equal, at about 2.05 Å. Octasulfur crystallizes in three distinct polymorphs: rhombohedral, and two monoclinic forms, of which only two are stable at standard conditions. The rhombohedral crystal form is the accepted standard state. The remaining polymorph is only stable between 96 and 115 °C at 100 kPa. Octasulfur forms several allotropes: α-sulfur, β-sulfur, γ-sulfur, and λ-sulfur.

λ-Sulfur is the liquid form of octasulfur, from which γ-sulfur can be crystallised by quenching. If λ-sulfur is crystallised slowly, it will revert to β-sulfur. Since it must have been heated over 115 °C, neither crystallised β-sulfur or γ-sulfur will be pure. The only known method of obtaining pure γ-sulfur is by crystallising from solution.

Octasulfur easily forms large crystals, which are typically yellow and are somewhat translucent.

== Production and reactions ==
It is the main (99%) component of elemental sulfur, which is recovered from volcanic sources and is a major product of the Claus process, associated with petroleum refineries. In space, sulfur can be formed by energetic processing of solid hydrogen sulfide, which explains the recent detection of octasulfur in the return samples from the carbonaceous asteroid Ryugu. Octasulfur is produced in small amounts in biology via sulfur extrusion from polysulfides, which are themselves derived from hydrogen sulfide and hydropersulfides.

== See also ==
- Sulfur (pharmacy)
