= Disulfur monoxide =

Chemical compound with sulfur and oxygen

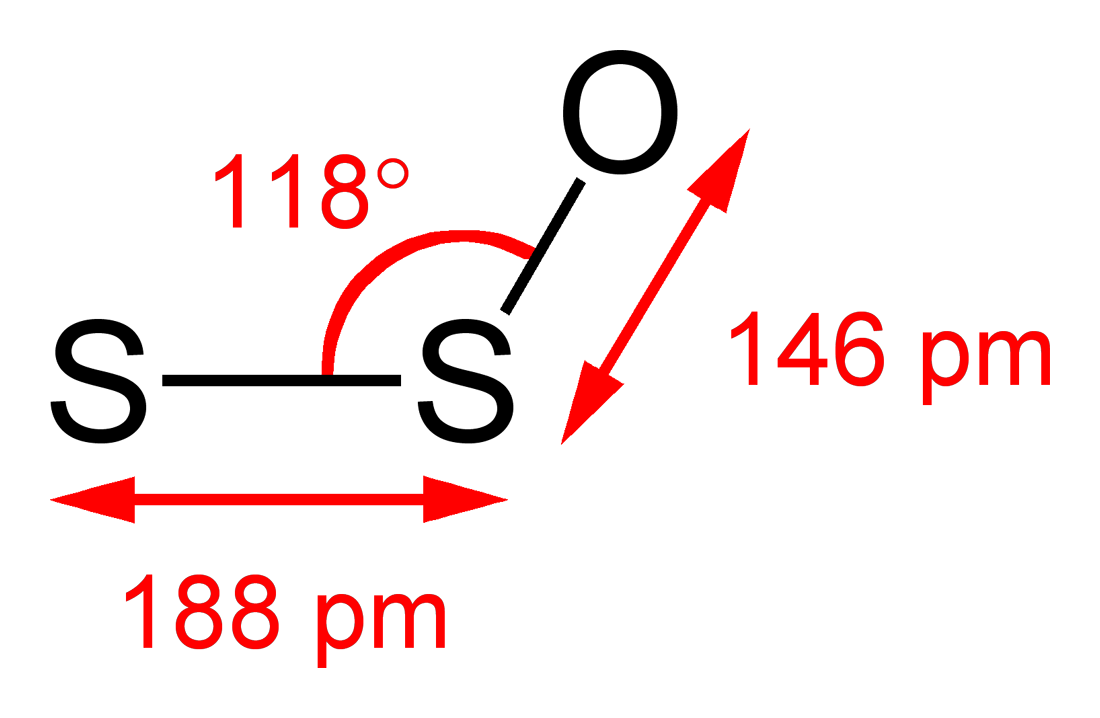
- Structure of S_{2}O

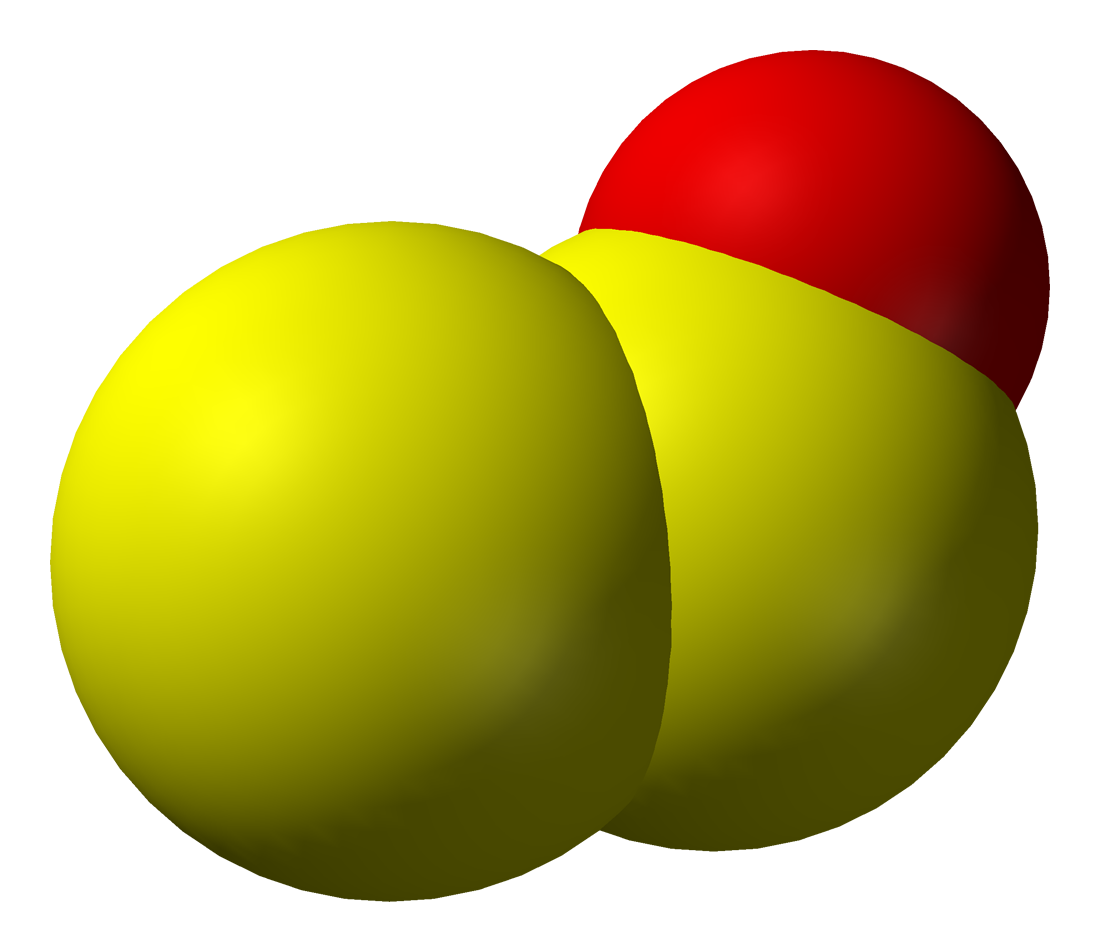
- solid ball model of S_{2}O

Names
- Other names sulfur suboxide; sulfuroxide;

Identifiers
CAS Number	20901-21-7
3D model (JSmol)	Interactive image
ChemSpider	124163
PubChem CID	140772
CompTox Dashboard (EPA)	DTXSID90175054
- InChI: : InChI=1S/OS2/c1-3-2 Key: TXKMVPPZCYKFAC-UHFFFAOYSA-N
- SMILES: O=S=S

Properties
Chemical formula	S_{2}O
Molar mass	80.1294 g/mol
Appearance	colourless gas or dark red solid

Structure
Coordination geometry	bent

Thermochemistry
Std molar entropy (S^{⦵}_{298})	266.89 J K^{−1} mol^{−1}
Std enthalpy of formation (Δ_{f}H^{⦵}_{298})	-56.48 kJ mol^{−1}

Hazards
- Occupational safety and health (OHS/OSH)
Main hazards	toxic

Related compounds
Related compounds	Trisulfur; SO; Ozone; SO_{2}
- Except where otherwise noted, data are given for materials in their standard state (at 25 °C [77 °F], 100 kPa). Infobox references

Disulfur monoxide or sulfur suboxide is an inorganic compound with the formula S_{2}O, one of the lower sulfur oxides. It is a colourless gas and condenses to give a roughly dark red coloured solid that is unstable at room temperature.

S_{2}O occurs rarely in natural atmospheres, but can be made by a variety of laboratory procedures. For this reason, its spectroscopic signature is very well understood.

== Structure and spectrum ==
Like sulfur dioxide (and, indeed, most molecules) but unlike sulfur monoxide, disulfur, or dioxygen, the ground state of disulfur monoxide is a singlet.

Condensed solid S_{2}O absorbs at 420 nm (roughly indigo) and 530 nm (roughly lime). These bands have been assigned to decomposition products S_{3} and S_{4}.

In the ultraviolet, S_{2}O has absorption band systems in the ranges 250–340 nm and 190–240 nm. There are bands at 323.5 and 327.8 nm. The band in the 315–340 nm range is due to the C^{1}A′–X^{1}A′ (π* ← π) transition.

Gaseous disulfur monoxide does not absorb light in the visible spectrum.

The microwave spectrum of S_{2}O has the following rotational parameters: A = 41915.44 MHz, B = 5059.07 MHz, and C = 4507.19 MHz. Moreover, the microwave spectrum suggests the S−S−O angle is 117.88° with S−S and S−O bond lengths of 188.4 and 146.5 pm, respectively. In the 327.8 nm excited state, the central angle tightens to 109°.

The harmonic frequency for S−S stretching is 415.2 cm^{−1}.

== Synthesis ==
=== Historical ===
Disulfur monoxide was discovered by Peter W. Schenk in 1933 with a glow discharge though sulfur vapour and sulfur dioxide. He discovered that the gas could survive for hours at single digit pressures of mercury in clean glass, but it decomposed near 30 mmHg (4 kPa). Schenk assigned the formula as SO and called it sulfur monoxide. In 1956, D. J. Meschi and R. J. Myers established the formula as S_{2}O.

=== Preparation ===
Oxidizing sulfur with copper(II) oxide:

3 S_{8} + 12 CuO → 12 CuS + 4 S_{2}O + 4 SO_{2}

A relatively pure generator is the reaction of thionyl chloride with silver(I) sulfide:

SOCl_{2} + Ag_{2}S → 2 AgCl + S_{2}O

Also 5,6-di-tert-butyl-2,3,7-trithiabicyclo[2.2.1]hept-5-ene 2-endo-7-endo-dioxide decomposes upon heating with release of S_{2}O:

Triphenylphosphine sulfide reacts with sulfinyltosylimide to give S_{2}O and tosyltriphenylphosphinylamide:

TsNSO + SPPh_{3} → TsNPPh_{3} + S_{2}O

== Occurrence ==
=== Volcanism ===
Volcanoes on Io produce substantial quantities of S_{2}O. It can form between 1% and 6% when hot 100-bar S_{2} and SO_{2} gas erupts from volcanoes. It is believed that Pele on Io is surrounded by solid S_{2}O.

=== Terran atmosphere ===
Disulfur monoxide is too unstable to survive at standard conditions, but transient sources include incomplete combustion of sulfur vapor and thermal decomposition of sulfur dioxide in a glow discharge.

=== As a ligand ===
Disulfur monoxide occurs as a ligand bound to transition metals, typically with hapticity 2. Examples include OsCl(NO)(PPh_{3})_{2}(S_{2}O); [Ir(PPh_{2})_{2}(S_{2}O)]^{+}; and MeCpMn(CO_{2})(S_{2}O). These complexes are closely related to transition metal sulfur dioxide complexes.

== Reactions ==
On decomposition at room temperature it forms SO_{2} via the formation of polysulfur oxides:

2 S_{2}O → S_{3} + SO_{2}

S_{2}O reacts with diazoalkanes to form dithiirane 1-oxides.
