= Sulfur monoxide =

Skeletal formula of sulfur monoxide
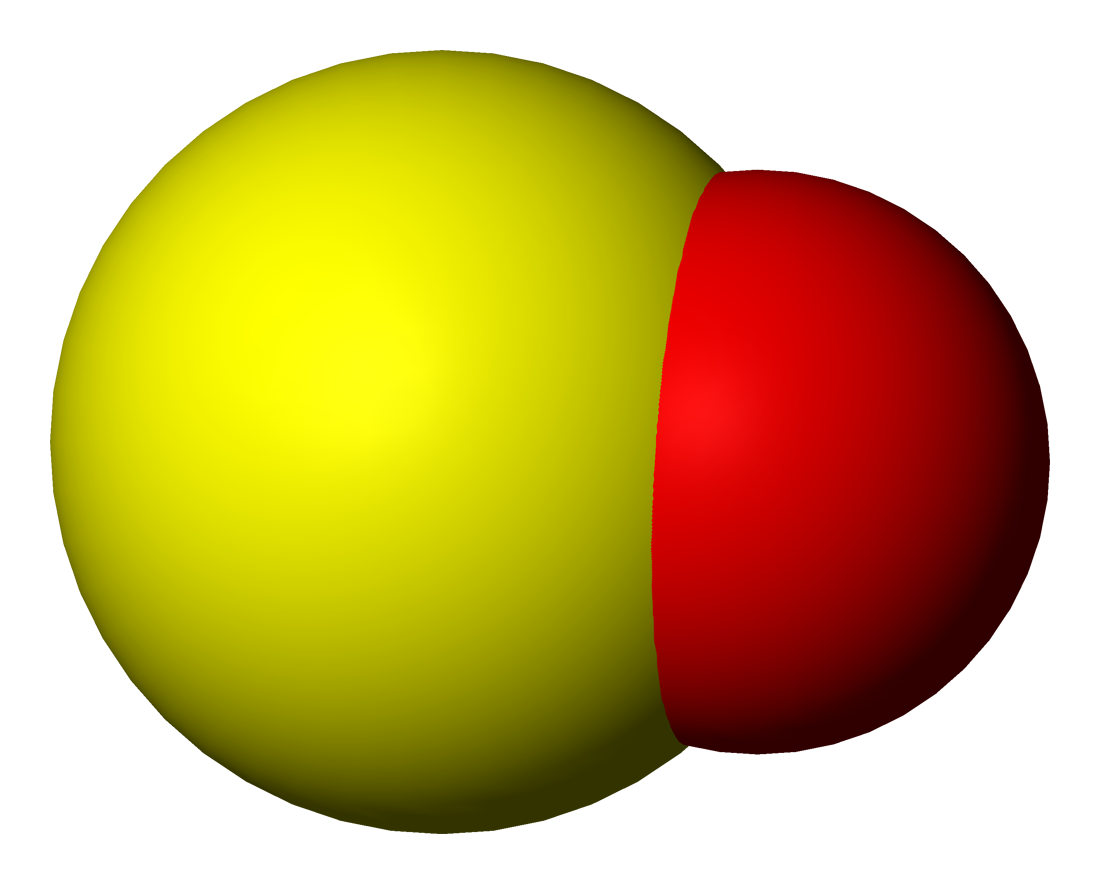
Spacefill model of sulfur monoxide
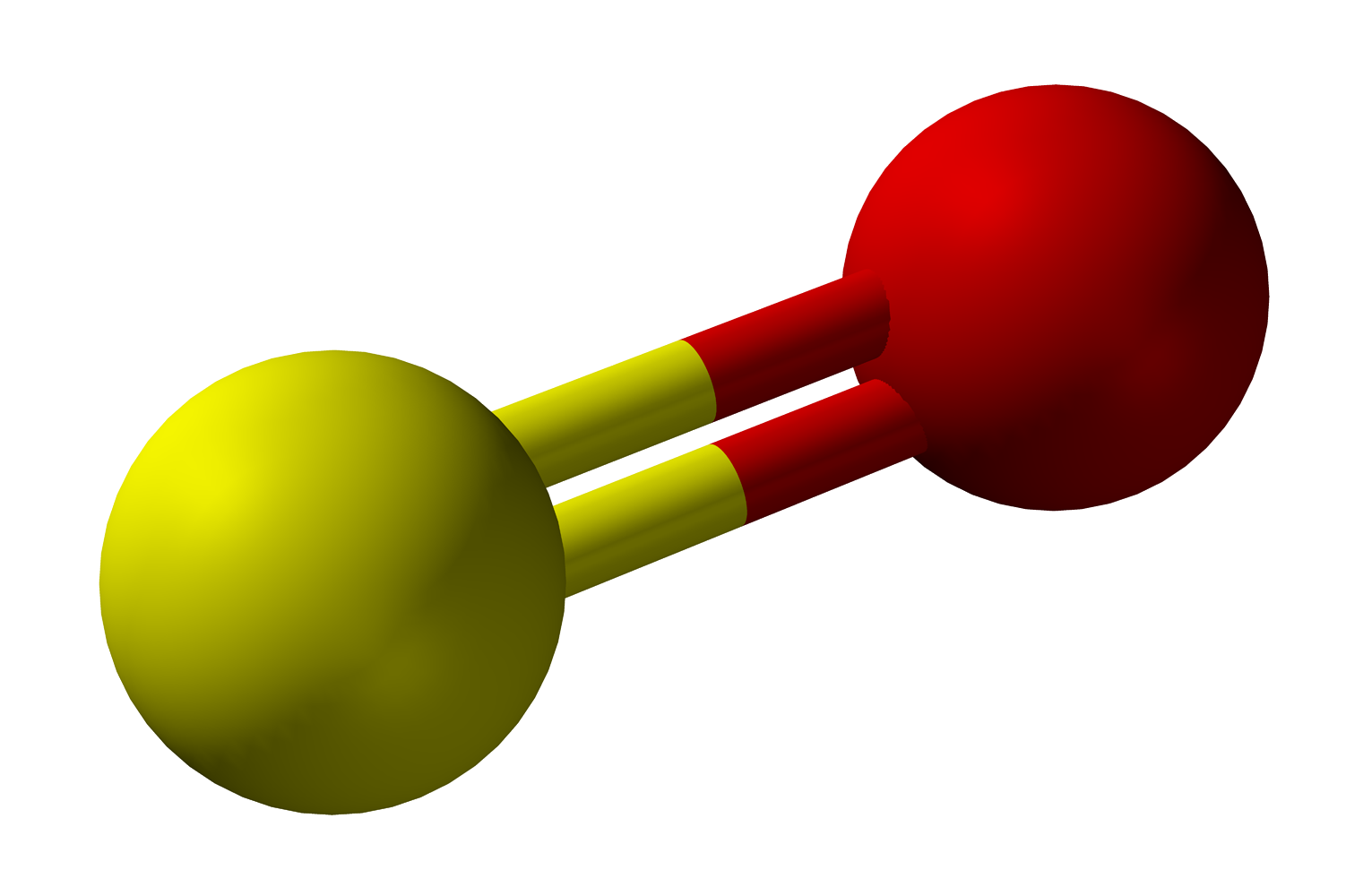
- Ball and stick model of sulfur monoxide

Names
- IUPAC name Sulfur monoxide
- Systematic IUPAC name Oxidosulfur

Identifiers
CAS Number	13827-32-2
3D model (JSmol)	Interactive image
Beilstein Reference	7577656
ChEBI	CHEBI:45822
ChemSpider	102805
Gmelin Reference	666
MeSH	sulfur+monoxide
PubChem CID	114845
CompTox Dashboard (EPA)	DTXSID60160558
- InChI: InChI=1S/OS/c1-2 Key: XTQHKBHJIVJGKJ-UHFFFAOYSA-N; InChI=1/OS/c1-2 Key: XTQHKBHJIVJGKJ-UHFFFAOYAK
- SMILES: O=S

Properties
Chemical formula	SO
Molar mass	48.064 g mol^{−1}
Appearance	Colourless gas
Solubility in water	Reacts
log P	0.155

Thermochemistry
Std molar entropy (S^{⦵}_{298})	221.94 J K^{−1} mol^{−1}
Std enthalpy of formation (Δ_{f}H^{⦵}_{298})	5.01 kJ mol^{−1}

Related compounds
Related compounds	Triplet oxygen Disulfur
- Except where otherwise noted, data are given for materials in their standard state (at 25 °C [77 °F], 100 kPa). verify (what is ?) Infobox references

Sulfur monoxide is an inorganic compound with formula SO. It is only found as a dilute gas phase. When concentrated or condensed, it converts to S_{2}O_{2} (disulfur dioxide). It has been detected in space but is rarely encountered intact otherwise.

== Structure and bonding ==
The SO molecule has a triplet ground state similar to O_{2} and S_{2}, that is, each molecule has two unpaired electrons. The S−O bond length of 148.1 pm is similar to that found in lower sulfur oxides (e.g. S_{8}O, S−O = 148 pm) but is longer than the S−O bond in gaseous S_{2}O (146 pm), SO_{2} (143.1 pm) and SO_{3} (142 pm).

The molecule is excited with near infrared radiation to the singlet state (with no unpaired electrons). The singlet state is believed to be more reactive than the ground triplet state, in the same way that singlet oxygen is more reactive than triplet oxygen.

== Production and reactions ==
The SO molecule is thermodynamically unstable, converting initially to S_{2}O_{2}. Consequently controlled syntheses typically do not detect the presence of SO proper, but instead the reaction of a chemical trap or the terminal decomposition products of S_{2}O_{2} (sulfur and sulfur dioxide).

Production of SO as a reagent in organic syntheses has centred on using compounds that "extrude" SO. Examples include the decomposition of the relatively simple molecule ethylene episulfoxide:

C_{2}H_{4}SO → C_{2}H_{4} + SO

Yields directly from an episulfoxide are poor, and improve only moderately when the carbons are sterically shielded. A much better approach decomposes a diaryl cyclic trisulfide oxide, C_{10}H_{6}S_{3}O, produced from naphthalene-1,8-dithiol and thionyl chloride.

SO inserts into alkenes and alkynes to produce thiirane oxides and thiirene S-oxides respectively. It reacts with dienes to produce 2,5-dihydrothiophene S-oxides.

Sulfur monoxide may form transiently during the metallic reduction of thionyl bromide.

=== Generation under extreme conditions ===
In the laboratory, sulfur monoxide can be produced by treating sulfur dioxide with sulfur vapor in a glow discharge. It has been detected in single-bubble sonoluminescence of concentrated sulfuric acid containing some dissolved noble gas.

Benner and Stedman developed a chemiluminescence detector for sulfur via the reaction between sulfur monoxide and ozone:

SO + O_{3} → SO_{2}* + O_{2}
SO_{2}* → SO_{2} + hν

(* indicates an excited state)

== Occurrence ==
=== Ligand for transition metals ===
Transition metal complexes of sulfur monoxide are well-known. One example is Fe_{3}(μ^{3}-S)(μ^{3}-SO)(CO)_{9}.

=== Astrochemistry ===
Sulfur monoxide has been detected around Io, one of Jupiter's moons, both in the atmosphere and in the plasma torus. It has also been found in the atmosphere of Venus, in Comet Hale–Bopp, in 67P/Churyumov–Gerasimenko, and in the interstellar medium.

On Io, SO is thought to be produced both by volcanic and photochemical routes. The principal photochemical reactions are proposed as follows:

O + S_{2} → S + SO
SO_{2} → SO + O

Sulfur monoxide has been found in NML Cygni.

=== Biological chemistry ===
Sulfur monoxide may have some biological activity. The formation of transient SO in the coronary artery of pigs has been inferred from the reaction products, carbonyl sulfide and sulfur dioxide.

== Sulfur monoxide dication ==
Sulfur dioxide SO_{2} in presence of hexamethylbenzene C_{6}(CH_{3})_{6} can be protonated under superacidic conditions (HF·AsF_{5}) to give the non-rigid π-complex C_{6}(CH_{3})_{6}SO^{2+}. The SO^{2+} moiety can essentially move barrierless over the benzene ring. The S−O bond length is 142.4(2) pm.

C_{6}(CH_{3})_{6} + SO_{2} + 3 HF·AsF_{5} → [C_{6}(CH_{3})_{6}SO][AsF_{6}]_{2} + [H_{3}O][AsF_{6}]

== Disulfur dioxide ==
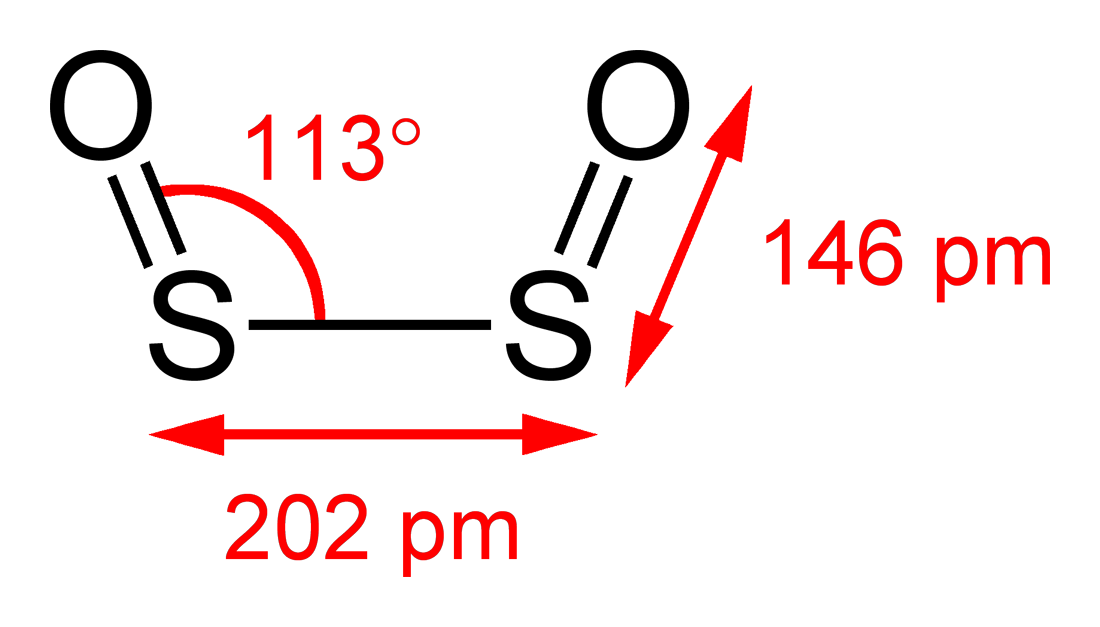
The structure of disulfur dioxide, S_{2}O_{2}

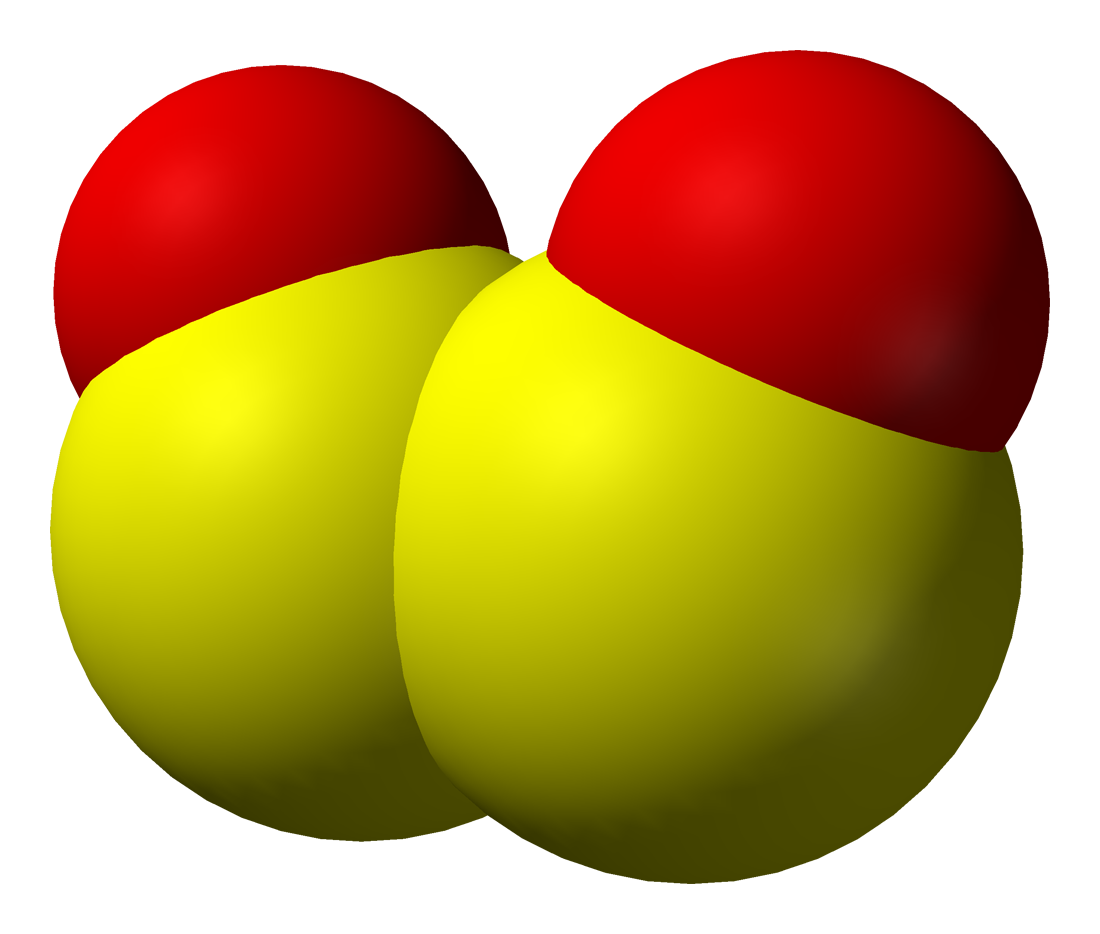
A space-filling model of the disulfur dioxide molecule

SO converts to disulfur dioxide (S_{2}O_{2}). Disulfur dioxide is a planar molecule with C_{2v} symmetry. The S−O bond length is 145.8 pm, shorter than in the monomer, and the S−S bond length is 202.45 pm. The O−S−S angle is 112.7°. S_{2}O_{2} has a dipole moment of 3.17 D.
