= Disulfur =

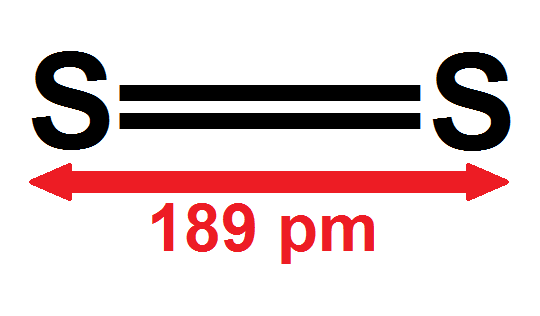
- Ball and stick model of disulfur molecule

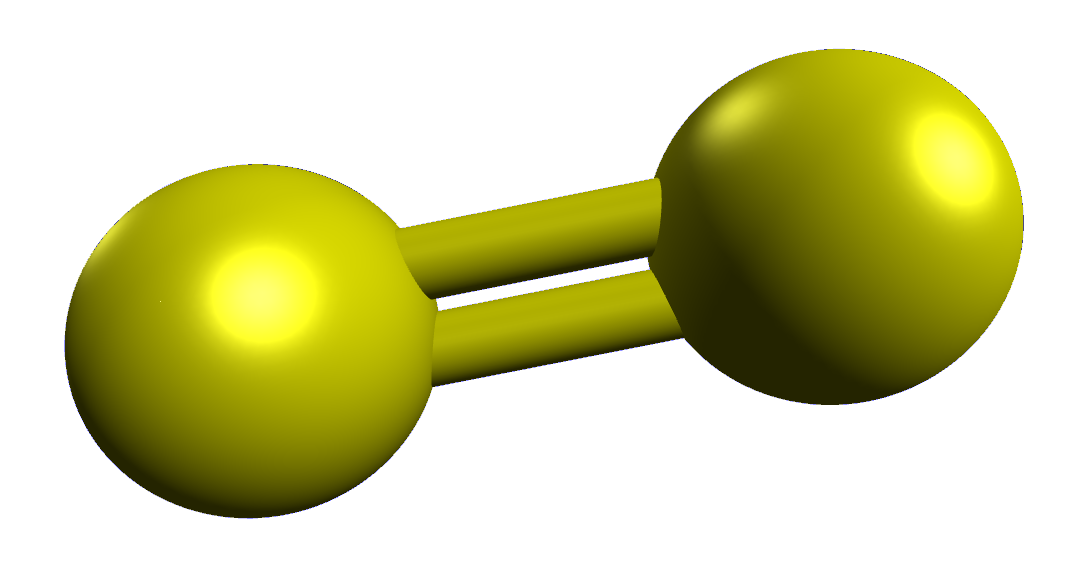

Names
- IUPAC name Disulfur
- Systematic IUPAC name Disulfene
- Other names Diatomic sulfur Sulfur dimer Disulphur

Identifiers
CAS Number	23550-45-0
3D model (JSmol)	Interactive image
ChEBI	CHEBI:29387
ChemSpider	4574100
Gmelin Reference	753
PubChem CID	5460602
CompTox Dashboard (EPA)	DTXSID20420100
- InChI: InChI=1S/S2/c1-2 Key: MAHNFPMIPQKPPI-UHFFFAOYSA-N
- SMILES: S=S

Properties
Chemical formula	S_{2}
Molar mass	64.12 g·mol^{−1}
Dipole moment	0 D

Thermochemistry
Heat capacity (C)	32.51 kJ K^{−1} mol^{−1}
Std molar entropy (S^{⦵}_{298})	228.17 J K^{−1} mol^{−1}
Std enthalpy of formation (Δ_{f}H^{⦵}_{298})	128.60 kJ mol^{−1}

Related compounds
Related compounds	Triplet oxygen
- Except where otherwise noted, data are given for materials in their standard state (at 25 °C [77 °F], 100 kPa). verify (what is ?) Infobox references

Disulfur is the diatomic molecule consisting of two sulfur atoms with the formula S_{2}. It is analogous to the dioxygen molecule but rarely occurs at room temperature. This violet gas is the dominant species in hot sulfur vapors. S_{2} is one of the minor components of the atmosphere of Io, which is predominantly composed of SO_{2}. The instability of S_{2} is usually described in the context of the double bond rule.

== Synthesis ==
This violet gas is generated by heating sulfur and is the predominant species above 720 °C, comprising 80% of all vapor species at 530°C and 100 mm Hg, and 99% of the vapor at low pressure (1 mm Hg) at 730 °C.

Disulfur can be produced when an atmosphere of COS is irradiated with UV light using a mercury photosensitizer or when CS_{2}, H_{2}S_{2}, S_{2}Cl_{2} or C_{2}H_{4}S, PSF_{3} or COS are irradiated.

=== Natural occurrence ===
Gaseous disulfur has been detected emanating from the surface of Jupiter's moon Io, from the vicinity of Pele volcano.

== Properties ==
The ground state of S_{2} is a triplet: a diradical, with two unpaired electrons like O_{2} and SO. It has the S–S bond length of 189 pm, much shorter than the S–S single bonds in S_{8}, which are 206 pm long. Its Raman spectrum consists of a band at 715 cm^{−1}. The corresponding O–O band for O_{2} is found at 1556 cm^{−1}. The S-S bond energy is 430 kJ/mol compared to 498 kJ/mol for O_{2}.

Singlet disulfur is believed to be the product of trisulfides with triphenylphosphine dibromide, or the thermal decomposition of dialkoxy disulfides. However, the disulfur produced in that reaction is believed singlet because it undergoes formal hetero-Diels–Alder cycloadditions, not because of any spectroscopic evidence.

Triplet disulfur readily photodissociates, with a mean lifespan of 7.5 min in sunlight.
